= Consulate General of Sweden, Jerusalem =

Diplomatic mission of Sweden in Jerusalem

Consulate General of Sweden, Jerusalem القنصلية العامة للسويد، القدس
- Location: Jerusalem
- Address: 5, Ibn Jubir Street; Sheikh Jarrah; Jerusalem
- Coordinates: 31.79049°N 35.23070°E
- Opening: 17 August 1901 (as honorary consulate); 1 July 1991 (as consulate general)
- Jurisdiction: Jerusalem, West Bank, Gaza Strip
- Consul General: Sophie Belfrage Becker
- Website: Official website

The Consulate General of Sweden, Jerusalem is the diplomatic mission of Sweden in Jerusalem. Formally, its consular district is limited to the city of Jerusalem, but in practice, it handle matters outside the city, including in the West Bank and Gaza Strip. The history of the Swedish consulate in Jerusalem dates back to 1901, when Herman Zethelius proposed its establishment due to the increasing Scandinavian presence in the city. Initially serving as an honorary consulate, it later became a vital hub for Swedish nationals and others seeking assistance in the region.

Over the years, the consulate's responsibilities expanded to include monitoring the Israeli–Palestinian peace process and facilitating development cooperation initiatives. In 1991, the honorary consulate was upgraded to a career consulate general, reflecting the growing importance of Sweden's presence in the region. The consulate's buildings have changed locations several times, with the current chancery situated in Sheikh Jarrah, East Jerusalem, and the residence in the Greek Colony area, West Jerusalem. The Swedish consulate's role remains pivotal, providing consular services, promoting dialogue, and contributing to peace-building efforts in the region.

== History ==
In a submission to the Ministry for Foreign Affairs on 4 March 1901, Herman Zethelius, the Swedish consul in Smyrna, proposed the establishment of a Swedish–Norwegian honorary consulate in Jerusalem. The proposal was based on the increase of Scandinavian residents in Jerusalem, who were primarily American and English colonists. At that time, the Scandinavians numbered around 110 people, including those who had become American citizens but still felt a strong connection to their countries of origin. Most Scandinavians were poor but skilled artisans and farmers, engaged in fruit preservation and weaving, which had potential for trade in Palestine. Despite their good qualities, they were subjected to persecution and harassment, particularly from certain missionaries due to religious differences. Because of these difficulties and the lack of official representation, the Scandinavians had suffered great injustices. The Swedish mission in Constantinople and other authorities recommended the establishment of a consulate, which was decided by King in Council on 17 August 1901. The consulate was established with a consular district comprising Palestine and the city of Damascus, which area was restricted to only the Jerusalem Sanjak at the time of the announcement of the exequatur. The first honorary consul was the Jewish Dr. Isaac Gregory d'Arbéla. He obtained his position primarily due to the recommendations given by the consul Zethelius, for the so-called Larsonites from Nås who were in Jerusalem. On 30 May 1902, he was granted resignation from the consular service.

On 10 July 1903, the German theologian and orientalist Gustaf Dalman was appointed as the new honorary consul. The consulate, which was the youngest among Jerusalem's twelve consulates, began its operations on 9 February 1904, and was located in the house of the German Protestant Institute of Archaeology, where its director, Gustaf Dalman, had his residence. At this time, there was a Swedish colony in Jerusalem consisting of 37 people, almost all of whom belonged to the Christian-communist Overcomers' Society (Overcomersamfundet). The consulate's primary task was to "protect and safeguard these Swedes, to teach them not to forget their mother tongue in their English-speaking surroundings, and to strengthen their national sentiments." In addition to the Swedish colony in Jerusalem, which also included a Jewish family, the consulate's concern extended to the young work of the Swedish Jerusalem Association (Svenska Jerusalemsföreningen) in Palestine. This consisted of a small school for Arab children in Jerusalem, which was annexed to the German deaconesses' orphanage Talitha Kumi, as well as Dr. Ribbing's medical work in Bethlehem, where the doctor's family, along with two female assistants, formed a small Swedish colony of six people. The consulate was also used by Danish workers who sought out Jerusalem and, in the absence of a Danish consulate, sought help from the Swedish consul.

Dalman resigned in 1921, and the Swiss Jonas Kuebler was appointed acting honorary consul, followed by the first Swede, Hol Lars "Lewis" Larsson, who became the regular honorary consul in 1925. He was one of about 35 residents from Nås, Dalarna, who emigrated to Jerusalem in 1896, which inspired Selma Lagerlöf's novel Jerusalem (1901–1902).

On 27 September 1947, a bomb exploded at the gate of the Swedish consulate in Jerusalem. The explosion caused some minor damage to the building, but no one was injured. The police suspected that the bomb was placed by a Jew or an Arab who was angry about the United Nations Partition Plan for Palestine that the United Nations Special Committee on Palestine had developed under the chairmanship of the Swede Emil Sandström. The bomb attack occurred during Consul Larsson's visit to Sweden when his son Edmund Larsson served as acting honorary consul. At the end of October 1947, the King in Council granted Consul Hol Lars Larsson's resignation. His son, Edmund Larsson, wished not to become consul. The reason for this was the bomb attack on the consulate building in September, which was owned by Hol Lars Larsson. The Ministry for Foreign Affairs in Stockholm subsequently conducted an investigation into whether Sweden would continue to have a consul in Jerusalem. It was the Swedish minister in Cairo who handled the investigation. In November of the same year, civil war broke out in Mandatory Palestine. The Swedish consulate thus remained vacant.

In 1960, the consul position in Jerusalem was reinstated when Colonel Stig Möllerswärd was appointed honorary consul general. The staff at the consulate then consisted of, according to Möllersvärd, "a consul general, a housekeeper, a dog, two canaries, and three goldfish." Möllerswärd returned to Stockholm in early 1967, where he died in October of the same year. Möllerswärd was succeeded by Arnold Hjertström, who established himself as consul in East Jerusalem in April 1967, when that part of the city was still under Jordanian control. Three months later, the Six-Day War broke out, and Hjertström suddenly found himself as consul in Israel. Hjertström made the Swedish consulate in Jerusalem a meeting place for visiting Swedes and Palestinians. It also served an important function as a consulate for Palestinians in Jerusalem and the West Bank. During his tenure, the consulate effectively became equivalent to the career consulates general that the major powers had in Jerusalem. He facilitated the upgrade of the honorary consulate in 1991 to a career consulate general.

In 1993, there were eight career consulates general in Jerusalem, namely Belgium, France, Greece, Italy, the United Kingdom, Spain, the US, and Sweden. All of them—except the Swedish one—were established in Jerusalem before 1948. Since 1993, the consulate general for Turkey has opened, and the ones for the United States and the United Kingdom have been closed.

== Status ==
Many of today's consulates general in Jerusalem have ancient origins. They originally emerged to protect the interests of Christians during Ottoman times. The consuls then had a special status, based on the Ottoman millet system that granted certain rights and autonomy to religious minorities, as well as on treaties that the Sublime Porte was forced to conclude with the European powers from the 15th century onwards. At the turn of the 20th century, these treaties meant that foreigners were not subject to Ottoman law, were exempt from taxes, and their residences and businesses were immune. They could only be arrested and deported with the intervention of their own countries' ambassadors. Disputes between foreigners were handled by special consular courts according to the laws of the country of origin. Even non-Muslim Ottoman subjects working for foreigners could obtain this privileged status through a consular diploma. Foreigners also had control over their religious institutions and schools.

In some areas, such as Palestine, these privileges continued even after the fall of the Ottoman Empire. However, they were abolished in Iraq and Egypt in the 1930s. Although the capitulations no longer apply, they still play a significant role in the status of consulates. Sweden established an honorary consulate in Jerusalem in 1903 to protect Swedish interests, especially for Swedish Christian pilgrims visiting the city. Since then, Sweden has had an uninterrupted presence in Jerusalem, and no other nation has had the same status. In 1991, Sweden's honorary consulate was upgraded to a career consulate general. Other countries that previously had consular representation in Jerusalem, such as Germany and Russia, have attempted to reopen their missions but have encountered obstacles due to a lack of continuous presence.

The consulates in Jerusalem have a special status under international law because no state recognizes Israel's sovereignty over the city, and only one state recognizes Jordan's. As a result, each consulate general reports directly to its country's foreign ministry and not to its embassy. The consulates monitor the status quo principles and the corpus separatum idea and also have a role as observers of the Palestinians' situation under Israeli occupation, in accordance with the Geneva Conventions. The consulates general in Jerusalem, which do not have exequaturs or diplomatic status, also have, in addition to their regular duties, a special observer role that is unique in the world. They have been granted permission by the Israeli authorities through a simple procedure. Formally, their district is limited to the city of Jerusalem, but in practice, they handle matters even outside the city, including in the West Bank and Gaza Strip.

== Tasks ==
The Consul General of Sweden is responsible for the entire corpus separatum, East Jerusalem, the Arab part, as well as its counterpart, West Jerusalem, the Jewish part.

The Consulate General provides consular assistance to Swedish nationals within its consular jurisdiction, catering to approximately 600 individuals, of which 450 reside in Jerusalem. It facilitates the issuance of visas, work permits, and residence permits for non-Swedish nationals. Additionally, the Consulate General actively monitors and communicates developments in the Israeli–Palestinian peace process, maintaining dialogue with the Palestinian Authority. Furthermore, it oversees Swedish development cooperation initiatives in Palestine, aimed at fostering democratic state-building efforts and advancing the peace process.

== Buildings ==
=== Chancery ===
When the Swedish–Norwegian honorary consulate opened in 1903, it was located in the residence of honorary consul Gustaf Dalman at the German Protestant Institute of Archaeology on the northern side of the Mount of Olives in East Jerusalem.

During the 1960s, when Stig Möllerswärd was honorary consul general, the consulate was located in his house on Via Dolorosa, Station 3.

Today the chancery is located at 5 Ibn Jubir Street in Sheikh Jarrah in East Jerusalem.

=== Residence ===
The property housing the residence of the Swedish Consul General is located at 13 Yonatan Street in the Greek Colony area in the Israeli western part of Jerusalem, unlike the chancery which is located in the Palestinian East Jerusalem. The buildings in this area date back to the late 19th and early 20th centuries. The historically listed building is one of the oldest in the area and was constructed around 1880. A renovation of the house took place in 1987 by Jacob Cantor. The house was purchased by the Swedish state in 1991, the same year Sweden opened its consulate general. Upon the purchase in 1991, the house underwent a complete renovation by architect Bo Myrenberg and was also redesigned to serve as a residence.

In 2012, the National Property Board of Sweden carried out a comprehensive renovation and expansion of the building. The aim was to create more spacious representation areas that blended well into the cultural-historical environment. An important part of the renovation was to increase the surface area of the residence, and to achieve this, the former terrace was integrated into the building to serve as a new dining room. The expansion was characterized by facades mostly made of glass and a curved roof, which evoked associations with tents and market stalls. The architectural firm Hidemark & Stintzing was responsible for the design of the expansion, and the work was carried out by local contractors under the supervision of a local architect. During the expansion, the courtyard was paved by craftsmen using traditional materials and methods. An old stone pavement was reused as a carpet in front of the entrance and as a contrasting band around the plantings. Internally, the residence's kitchen and wet areas underwent renovations, while the technical installations were reviewed and updated. One of the walls in the guest toilet at the main entrance was adorned with locally hand-painted tiles inspired by mosaics from an older building in Bethlehem.

The house is constructed of local stone and originally had two floors, with a third floor added in the late 20th century. The plot encompasses 630 square meters. The building is heated using electric radiators, heat pumps, and solar panels for hot water. The mature garden features terraces for outdoor entertainment and is surrounded by a wall that provides privacy. Adjacent to the entrance is a carport for two cars. The single-story house in the garden and the extension at the front of the house, built in 2011, are integrated with consideration for the original environment, like other contemporary additions.

== Heads of Mission ==
Name	Period	Title	Notes	Ref
Isaac Gregory d'Arbéla	17 August 1901 – 30 May 1902	Honorary consul		
Gustaf Dalman	10 July 1903 – 1921	Honorary consul	Consul general's exequatur on 29 September 1911.	
Jonas Kuebler	1921–1921	Acting honorary consul		
Hol Lars Larsson	1921–1925	Acting honorary consul		
Hol Lars Larsson	1925 – October 1947	Honorary consul		
Edmund Larsson	July 1947 – October 1947	Acting honorary consul		(Note: Hol Lars Larsson's son Edmund Larsson, served as acting honorary consul while his father was on a three-month vacation in Sweden, starting on 14 July 1947, until Hol Lars Larsson was granted retirement from the position at the end of October of the same year, and Edmund Larsson chose not to take over the position.)
–	1947–1960		Vacant.	
Stig Möllerswärd	1960–1967	Honorary consul	Consul general's exequatur. Died in office.	
Arnold Hjertström	1967–1991	Honorary consul	Consul general's exequatur	
Jan Nordlander	1991–1991	Acting consul general		
Mikael Dahl	October 1991 – 1994	Consul general	Also accredited to West Bank and Gaza Strip.	
Karin Bosch Roxman	1994–1999	Consul general		
Lars Jonsson	1999–2000	Acting consul general		
Catharina Kipp	2000–2002	Consul general		
Göran Berg	2002–2004	Consul general		
Nils Eliasson	2005–2010	Consul general		
Axel Wernhof	2010–2014	Consul general		
Jessica Olausson	2018–2021	Consul general		
Julius Liljeström	2021–2025	Consul general		
Sophie Belfrage Becker	2025–present	Consul general		

== See also ==
- Embassy of Sweden, Tel Aviv
- List of consulates-general in Jerusalem
- Palestine–Sweden relations
- List of diplomatic missions in Palestine
