= Consulate General of Spain, Jerusalem =

Consular representation of the Kingdom of Spain in the State of Palestine

Consulate General of the Kingdom of Spain in Jerusalem

General information
- Status: Completed
- Type: Consulate
- Location: Makhal Street 32, Jerusalem
- Coordinates: 31.796141°N 35.229643°E
- Inaugurated: 21 June 1853; 173 years ago

The Consulate General of Spain in Jerusalem is a diplomatic mission located in Sheikh Jarrah, East Jerusalem. The consulate provides consular services to Jerusalem, the West Bank and the Gaza Strip, acting as de facto diplomatic representation of Spain to the State of Palestine and to the Palestinian Authority (PA). The Consulate General also manages the economic, cultural and scientific relations with the PA, the Pious Work of the Holy Places and the Spanish cooperation in the area.

== Status ==
Along with the other eight historic consulates general (and the Apostolic Delegate to Jerusalem and Palestine), the Consulate General of Spain has its own unique regime. Unlike regular consulates, where the foreign state issues a letter of credence and the receiving state grants the exequatur (or acceptance), the historic consulates in Jerusalem do not have diplomatic relations with the State of Israel, and do not follow this procedure, as the diplomat is appointed solely by the country of origin and does not require acceptance from Israel. In fact, the Consulate General of Spain in Jerusalem is also unique because it is not affiliated with any embassy; it is a diplomatic mission in its own right.

== History ==
The Spanish presence in Holy Land dates back to the 13th century, thanks to the religious policy of the Aragonese monarchs. Also, in 1510 Pope Julius II recognized Ferdinand the Catholic as King of Naples, incorporating to the Aragonese crown several titles, highlighting that of the King of Jerusalem.

After the unification of Spain in the late-15th century, the Spanish crown assumed all that claims and continued protecting holy places in what is today Israel and Palestine. The influence of the Crown in the management of this places, as well as the economic contributions—which during the 14th to 19th centuries accounted for 80% of the total funds—, were reflected in the leadership of the Custody of the Holy Land. One of the most important offices, the Procurador de la Custodia, who managed the Custody's funds, was occupied for centuries by a Franciscan religious of Spanish nationality.

In 1772, King Charles III enacted a Real cédula to unify the protection policy of holy places and the Crown assumed directly the management of the Commissariat of the Holy Land, a Spanish institution tasked with the collection and transfer of funds to the Custody. At the same time, European powers started to establish consulates in Holy Land—United Kingdom (1838), France (1843), Belgium (1851), Greece (1862), Italy (1871), Sweden (1903), and Turkey (1925)—.

Spain, fearing to lose its presence and influence, did the same in 1853. By order of June 21, Queen Isabella II established a Consulate General. According to this norm, it was established to "deal with the Spanish Franciscan religious residing in Palestine, to zealously support the interests of religion and the State and to prevent the ancient rights and prerogatives of My Crown in the Holy Places from being disregarded". The royal order also parelized the transfer of funds and they were placed under the administration of the consul general. Likewise, the aforementioned Commissariat—which was already known at the time as the Pious Work of the Holy Places—was placed under the control of the Ministry of State. In fact, the queen's main motivation for creating the consulate was to avoid interference in the Spanish funds from the Latin Patriarchate of Jerusalem, reestablished by Pope Pius IX in 1847.

Spain continued to provide a great service to the Holy Land during the World War I. The traditional French protectorate over Christians in the Ottoman Empire was jeopardized, and the vacuum was filled by neutral Spain, which defended the immunity of the convents from Turkish aggression and plunder. In this endeavor, the relevant work of the Spanish Consul in Jerusalem, Antonio de la Cierva y Lewita, 2nd Count of Ballobar, was particularly noteworthy. During this Great War, the Count was known as the "universal consul", reaching the point of dealing with the interests of up to 29 countries, including all belligerent countries.

In 1940, the Pious Work of the Holy Places was re-established as an autonomous agency, that still exists.

Spain and Israel established diplomatic relations in 1986. Although Spain recognized the new Jewish state, it did not recognize its full sovereignty over Jerusalem. The joint statement between the two countries expressly stated that the establishment of diplomatic relations between the two countries "will in no way affect the status of the Consulate General of Spain in Jerusalem".

During the Gaza war that started after the October 7 attacks by Hamas, diplomatic tensions arose between Israel and Spain due to the heavy response of Israel, which Spain described as a genocide. In May 2024, after Spain recognized the State of Palestine, Israeli government ordered the consulate to stop giving assistance to Palestinians and threatened to close it permanently. Foreign minister José Manuel Albares rejected the Israeli government's demands and asserted that its "provocations" would not be tolerated, recalling that the consulate has a "very special status", being one of the historic ones, and that it existed "long before the existence of the State of Israel", having "functioned normally" since 1853.

== Pious Work of the Holy Places ==
As mentioned, the Pious Work of the Holy Places is still in operation. Re-established by law in 1940, it is currently regulated by the Statutes of 2015. The agency is part of the Ministry of Foreign Affairs—attached to the Under-Secretary of Foreign Affairs and supervised by the Consul General— and, according to the statutes, the agency is responsible for preserving Spain's historical presence in the Holy Land—mainly through cultural and educational events—, as well as preserving the Spanish heritage related to the land of Jesus, both in the Holy Places and in Spain.

Although the Spanish Crown renounced many of its privileges in 1994, especially those relating to Christian monasteries, according to the last reports in 2024, this agency still had around 273 properties distributed in Jerusalem, Rome, Morocco and Turkey.

== Spanish cooperation ==
The Spanish Agency for International Development Cooperation (AECID) has a Spanish Cooperation Office in the Consulate General since the 1990s. From 2003 to 2007, it also managed the Spanish cooperation in the Hashemite Kingdom of Jordan.

== List of consuls general ==
Since 1853, these have been the Spanish consuls in the Holy Land:

- Pío de Andrés García (1853–1856)
- Fernando de la Vera e Isla (1856)
- Miguel Tenorio de Castilla (1856–1859)
- Mariano Prellezo e Isla (1862–1863)
- Luis Dedice (1863–1868)
- Tomás Magdalena de Tejada, Count of Casa Sarriá (1869–1877)
- Ramón Ozores (1877)
- José Alcalá Galiano, Count of Torrijos (1878)
- Salvador Rancés Villanueva (1879)
- Manuel Sanz Enríquez (1881–1888)
- Antonio Díaz Miranda (1888–1895)
- Francisco Javier Salas Sichar (1895–1900)
- Juan Vázquez López-Amor (1900–1901)
- Rafael de los Casares y Gil (1901–1907)
- Ángel Sánchez Vera (1907–1912)
- Antonio de la Cierva y Lewita, Count of Ballobar (1913–1919)
- Pablo Jaurrieta y Muzquiz (1920–1930)
- Francisco de Ranero (1930–1932)
- José Buhigas Dalmau (1933–1934)
- Julio Prieto Villabrilla (1934)
- Antonio Carrasco Gordillo (1934–1937)
- Juan Ignacio Irujo y Ollo (1937–1938)
- Antonio Gordillo y Carrasco (1943–1946)
- Gonzalo Diéguez y Redondo (1948–1949)
- Antonio de la Cierva y Lewita, Count of Ballobar (1949–1952)
- Pedro López García (1952–1956)
- Mariano Madrazo y López de la Calle (1956–1958)
- José Antonio Balenchana y Paternain (1958–1962)
- Carlos Martínez de Orense y García, Marquess of Patiño (1962–1964)
- Ramón Sáenz de Heredia y de Manzanos (1964–1966)
- Alberto Pascual Villar (1966–1970)
- Joaquín Cervino Santías (1970–1973)
- Santiago de Churruca y Plaza, Count of Campo Rey (1973–1977)
- José Ramón Remacha (1977–1981)
- Ramón Armengod López (1982–1985)
- Santiago Martínez Caro (1985–1992)
- Juan Serrat (1992–1996)
- Andrés Collado (1996–1998)
- Manuel Salazar Palma (1998–2003)
- Ramón Ansoain Garraza (2006–2009)
- Alfonso Manuel Portabales Vázquez (2010–2013)
- Juan José Escobar Stemmann (2013–2016)
- Rafael Matos González de Careaga (2016–2018)
- Ignacio García-Valdecasas Fernández (2019–2021)
- Alfonso Lucini Mateo (2021–2024)
- José Javier Gutiérrez Blanco-Navarrete (since 2024)

== Bibliography ==
- Pertusa Rodríguez, Luis (2025). "Un caso único en el Derecho Internacional: los consulados generales históricos en Jerusalén" [A unique case in International Law: the historics consulates general in Jerusalem]. Revista española de derecho internacional (in Spanish) (77): 104–105. doi:10.36151/REDI.77.1.5. eISSN 2387-1253. ISSN 0034-9380.

== See also ==
- List of consulates-general in Jerusalem
