= Yahil =

Yahil is a surname. Notable people with the surname include:

- Chaim Yahil (1905–1974), Israeli diplomat
- Leni Yahil (1912–2007), German-born Israeli historian
