= List of ambassadors of Sweden to Israel =

Ambassador of Sweden to Israel
- Lesser coat of arms of the Kingdom of Sweden
- Incumbent; Alexandra Rydmark since 15 August 2024
- Ministry for Foreign Affairs; Swedish Embassy, Tel Aviv
- Style: His or Her Excellency (formal); Mr. or Madam Ambassador (informal)
- Reports to: Minister for Foreign Affairs
- Residence: 93 Eliezer Kaplan Street, Herzliya Pituah
- Seat: Tel Aviv, Israel
- Appointer: Government of Sweden
- Term length: No fixed term
- Inaugural holder: Gösta Hedengren
- Formation: 1951
- Website: Swedish Embassy, Tel Aviv

The Ambassador of Sweden to Israel (known formally as the Ambassador of the Kingdom of Sweden to the State of Israel) is the official representative of the government of Sweden to the president of Israel and government of Israel.

== History ==
On 16 February 1949, Sweden recognized the State of Israel de facto, and in July 1950, de jure. In January 1951, the Swedish government decided to establish a diplomatic mission in Israel, and Gösta Hedengren was appointed as the chargé d'affaires there. Hedengren and his wife arrived in Haifa on 2 April 1951, aboard the Italian ship Abbazia. They were received by representatives of the Israeli government and then traveled on to Tel Aviv, where he would open the Swedish legation. On 4 April 1951, Gösta Hedengren presented his credentials to Dr. Walter Eytan at the Israeli Foreign Ministry. The Tel Aviv newspaper Maariv wrote at the time that "the appointment marks the end of the tragic Swedish-Israeli conflict that began with the murder of Count Folke Bernadotte".

In June 1953, Jens Malling was appointed as the new chargé d'affaires. He arrived at Lod Airport on 2 July 1953, and was received by representatives of the Israeli Ministry of Foreign Affairs and the Swedish legation. In February 1956, Malling was appointed as Sweden's first envoy to Tel Aviv. He presented his credentials on 15 March 1956, to Israeli President Yitzhak Ben-Zvi in the presence of Foreign Minister Moshe Sharett.

In September 1957, an agreement was reached between the Swedish and Israeli governments on the mutual elevation of the respective countries' legations to embassies. The diplomatic rank was thereafter changed to ambassador instead of envoy extraordinary and minister plenipotentiary. In connection with this, Sweden's envoy to Tel Aviv, Östen Lundborg, was designated as ambassador.

Between 1981 and 2002, the ambassador held a dual accreditation to Nicosia, Cyprus.

== List of representatives ==
Name	Period	Title	Resident / Concurrent accreditation	Notes	Presented credentials	Ref
Gösta Hedengren	1951–1953	Chargé d'affaires			4 April 1951	
Jens Malling	1953–1956	Chargé d'affaires (Note: With diplomatic rank of legation counsellor.)				
Ingvar Grauers	April 1955 – November 1955	Chargé d'affaires ad interim (Note: During Jens Malling's service as head of the Swedish delegation to the Neutral Nations Supervisory Commission (NNSC) in Korea.)				
Jens Malling	1956–1956	Envoy			15 March 1956	
Östen Lundborg	1956 – September 1957	Envoy			5 July 1956	
Östen Lundborg	September 1957 – 1960	Ambassador			8 October 1957	
Hugo Tamm	1960–1963	Ambassador				
Inga Thorsson	1964–1966	Ambassador		Political appointee (non-career diplomat)		
Bo Siegbahn	1966–1970	Ambassador				
Sten Sundfeldt	1970–1975	Ambassador				
Iwo Dölling	1975–1979	Ambassador				
Torsten Örn	1979–1983	Ambassador	Dual accreditation to Nicosia (from 1981)			
Sven Hirdman	1983–1987	Ambassador	Dual accreditation to Nicosia			
Mats Bergquist	1987–1992	Ambassador	Dual accreditation to Nicosia			
Carl-Magnus Hyltenius	1992–1996	Ambassador	Dual accreditation to Nicosia			
John Hagard	1996–1999	Ambassador	Dual accreditation to Nicosia			
Anders Lidén	1999–2002	Ambassador	Dual accreditation to Nicosia			
Robert Rydberg	2003–2007	Ambassador				
Elisabet Borsiin Bonnier	2007–2010	Ambassador			3 December 2007	
Elinor Hammarskjöld	2010–2013	Ambassador			5 October 2010	
Carl Magnus Nesser	April 2013 – 2017	Ambassador			8 Aagust 2013	
Magnus Hellgren	1 September 2017 – 2020	Ambassador			29 November 2017	
Erik Ullenhag	September 2020 – 2024	Ambassador			4 November 2020	
Alexandra Rydmark	15 August 2024 – present	Ambassador			30 September 2025	

== Gallery ==
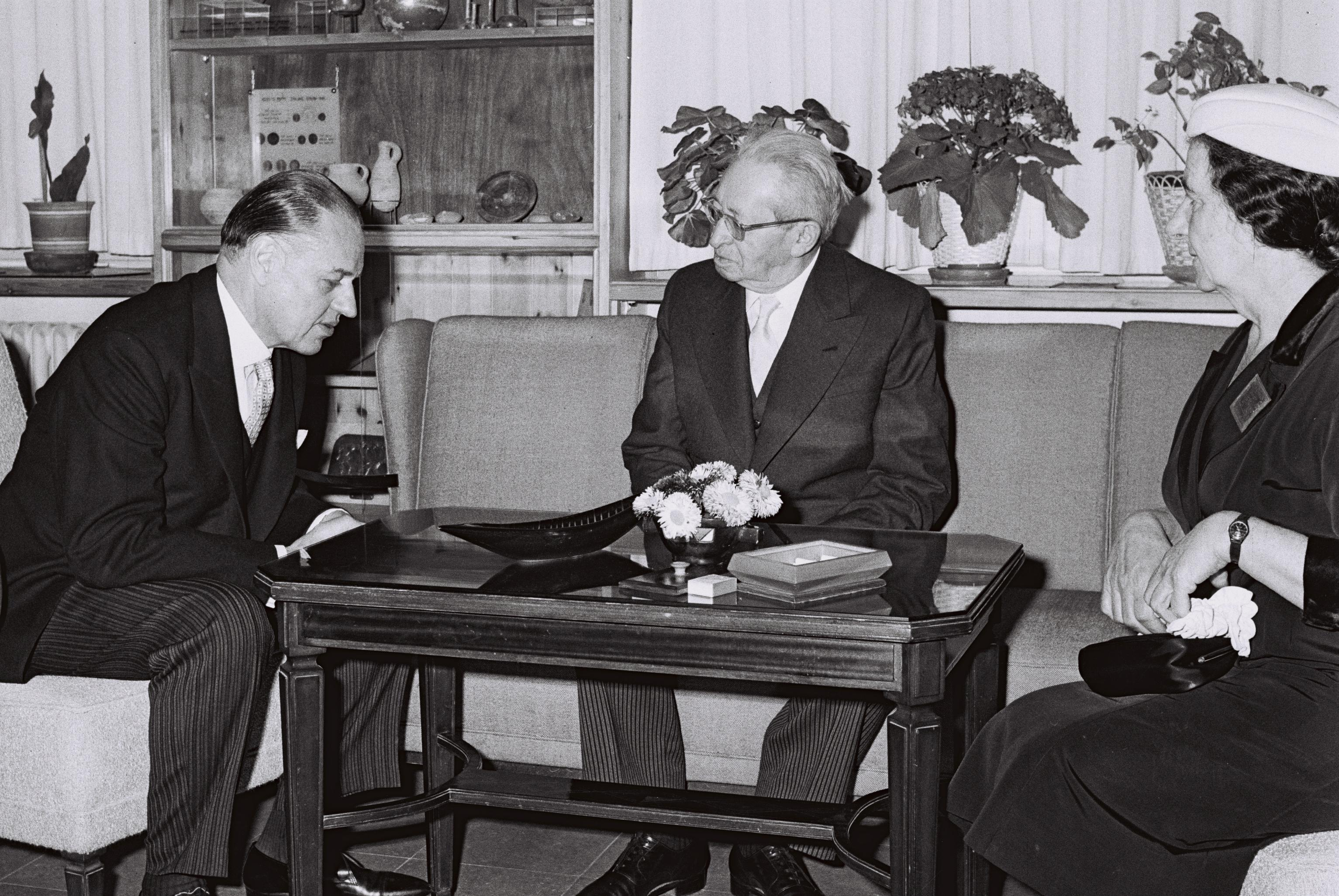
Ambassador Hugo Tamm (1960–1963) with President Yitzhak Ben-Zvi and Minister of Foreign Affairs Golda Meir.

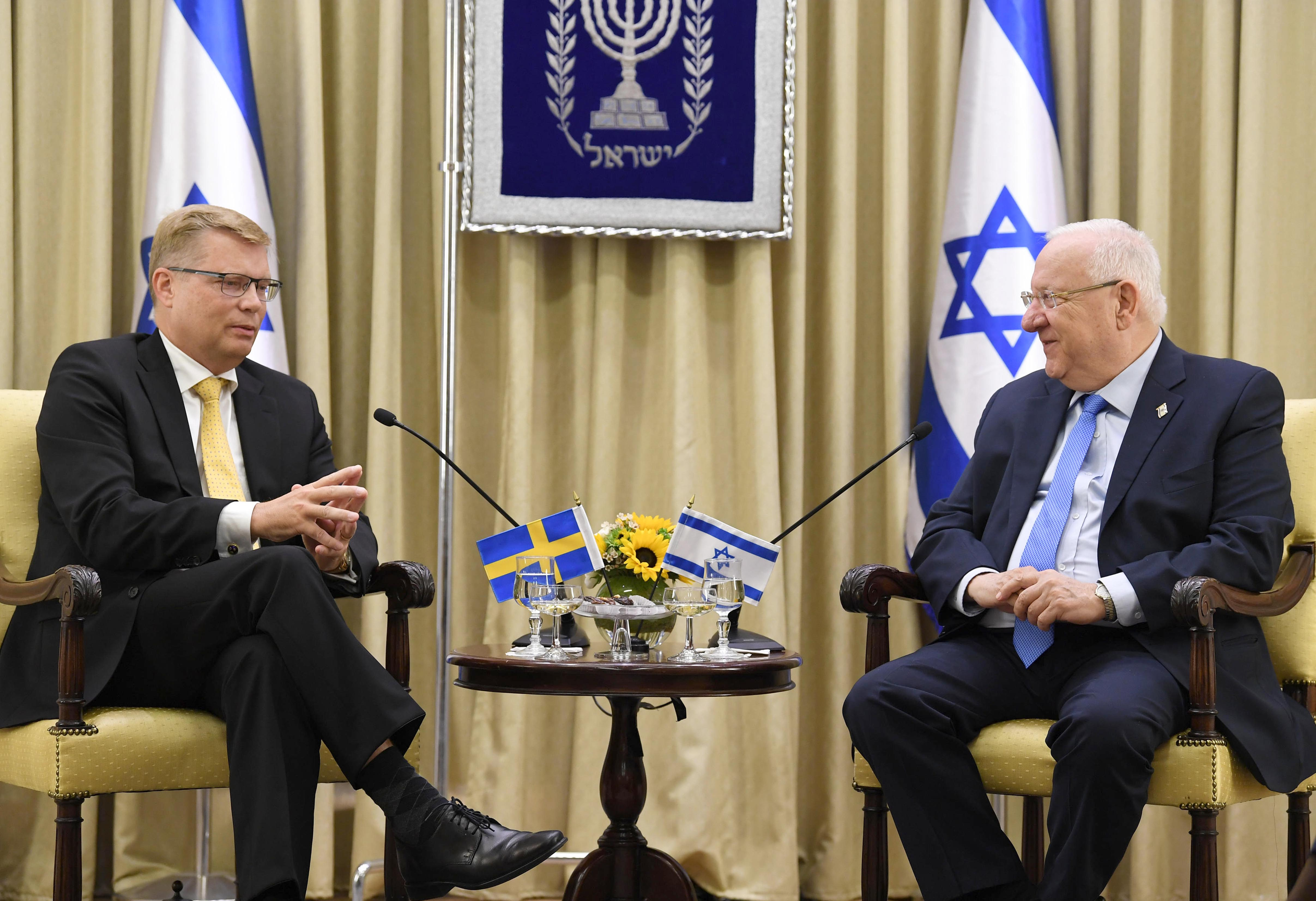
Ambassador Magnus Hellgren (2017–2020) and President Reuven Rivlin.

== See also ==
- Israel–Sweden relations
- Embassy of Sweden, Tel Aviv
