= List of ambassadors of Israel to Norway =

== List of ambassadors ==
- Avi Nir-Feldklein, 2022-present
- Alon Roth-Snir, 2018–2022
- Raphael Schutz, 2014–2018
- Naim Araidi, 2012–2014
- Michael Eligal, 2009–2012
- Miryam Shomrat, 2005–2008
- Liora Herzl, 2001–2005
- Amos Nadai, 1997–2001
- Joel Alon, 1990–1994
- Yehudith Huebner, 1983–1987
- Gad Elron, 1981–1983
- Hava Hareli, 1978–1981
- David Rivlin, 1975–1978
- Avigdor Dagan, 1969–1972
- Nathan Bar-Yaacov, 1963–1969
- Avner Gershon, 1962–1963
- Ambassador Reuven Barkat, 1960–1962
- Minister Chaim Yahil (Non-Resident, Stockholm), 1956–1959
- Minister Avraham Nissan (Non-Resident, Stockholm), 1950–1956
