= List of ambassadors of Israel to Iceland =

== List of ambassadors ==
- Alon Roth-Snir 2018 -
- Raphael Schutz 2014 - 2018
- Liora Herzl 2001 - 2005,
- Yehudith Huebner (Non-Resident, Oslo) 1983-1987
- Hava Hareli (Non-Resident, Oslo) 1978 - 1981
- Ambassador David Rivlin (Non-Resident, Oslo) 1975 - 1978
- Ambassador Avigdor Dagan (Non-Resident, Oslo) 1969 - 1972
- Minister Moshe Bitan (Non-Resident, Stockholm) 1962 - 1964
- Minister Chaim Yahil (Non-Resident, Stockholm) 1956 - 1959
- Minister Avraham Nissan (Non-Resident, Stockholm) 1950 - 1956
