= Lewis Larsson =

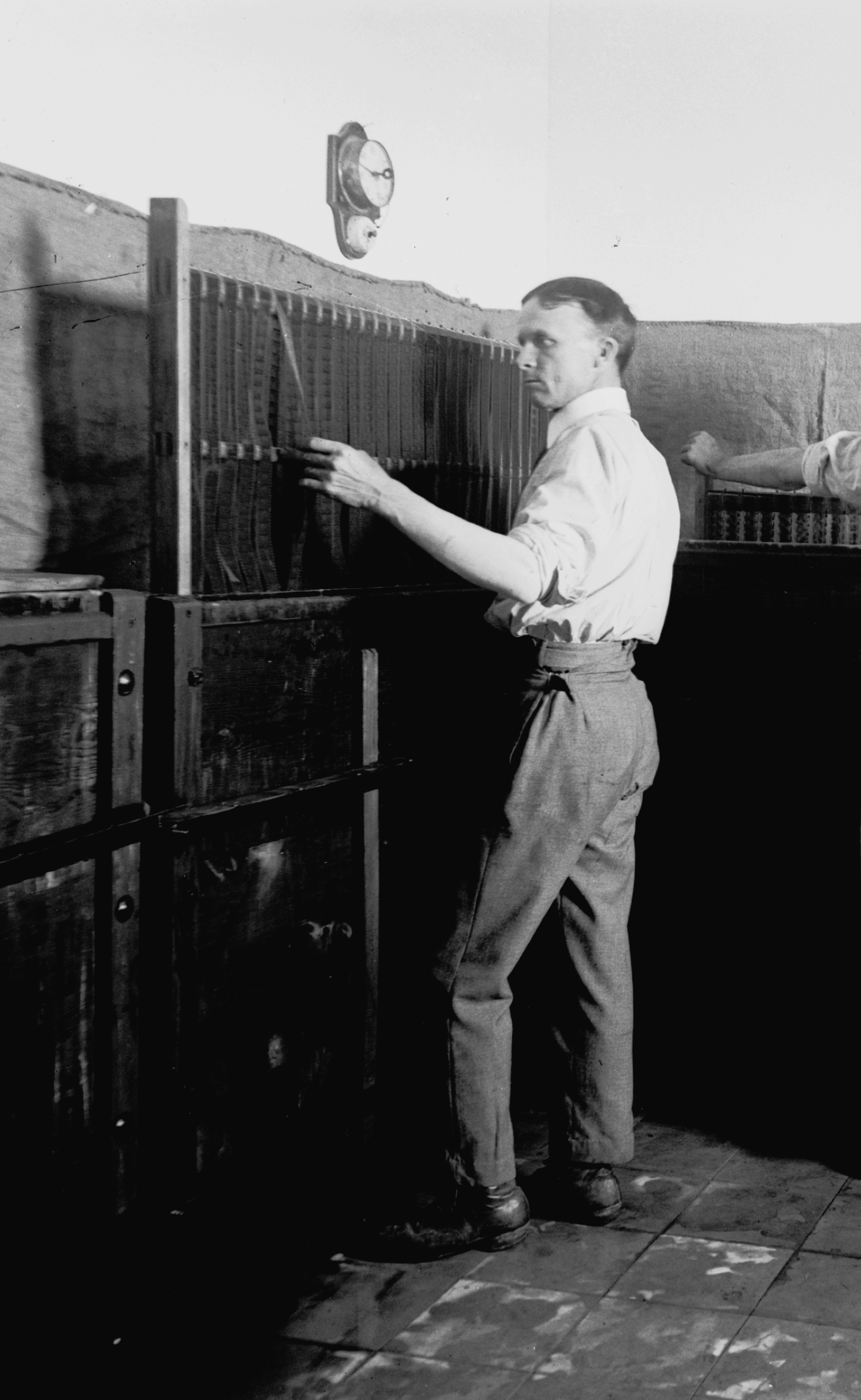
- Born: Hol Lars Larsson; 14 March 1881; Nås, Dalarna, United Kingdoms
- Died: 3 August 1958 (aged 77); Jerusalem, Israel
- Burial place: Lutheran Cemetery, Bethlehem
- Occupations: Photographer, consul

Lewis Larsson (14 March 1881 – 3 August 1958), was born Hol Lars Larsson in Nås, Sweden–Norway, and served as the de facto head of the Photographic Department of the American Colony in Jerusalem, British Mandate Palestine. Larsson was renowned for his use of photojournalism to record and document the cultures of the south Mediterranean, primarily within the Palestinian region. Larsson was also a well respected diplomat of Sweden who acted as the vice consul and consul to Jerusalem and in that role acted in the best interests of the American Colony.

== Early life ==
Lewis Larsson was the only son of Hol Lars Larsson and Israels Brita Ersdotter born in Nås, Sweden. His father died when he was only three years old and he was raised by his mother. He was one of five siblings, with the other four being his sisters, two born out of wedlock. In 1896, many of the residents of Nås emigrated, following the evangelist Olof Henrik Larsson, to the American Colony. This included Lewis and his family, and in 1896 they traveled mostly by train to Jerusalem in order to wait the "Return of the Lord" Lewis married Edith Larson, the daughter of the evangelist Olaf Larson.

== Career with the American Colony ==
=== Photography ===
At the age of 16, in 1897, Lewis Larsson began studying photography under the guidance of Elijah Meyers, the founder of the photography department in the American Colony. In 1904, Larsson succeeded him as head of the department, which was becoming quite profitable.

== Swedish Consul in Jerusalem ==
Larsson took the position of acting Swedish honorary consul and head of the Swedish consulate in Jerusalem in 1921, succeeding Gustaf Dalman who served in that position from 1903 to 1921. The new position caused him to cut back on his photography work with the American Colony. He became regular honorary consul in 1925 and served in this position until 1947.

== Photo gallery ==
Photographs by Lewis Larsson and the American Colony
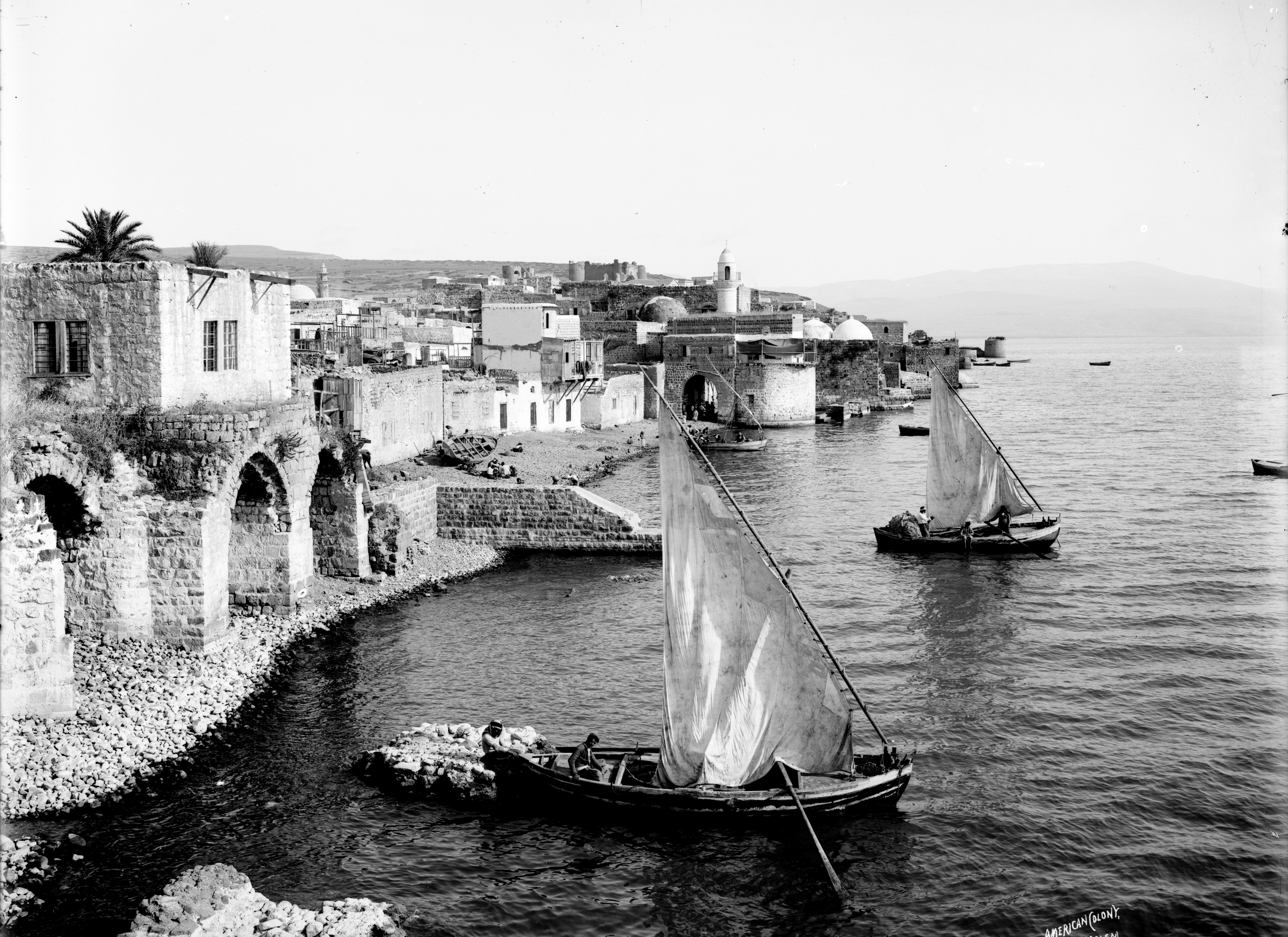
Tiberias, Palestine, photograph by Lewis Larsson taken between 1898 and 1914. Source: Library of Congress.

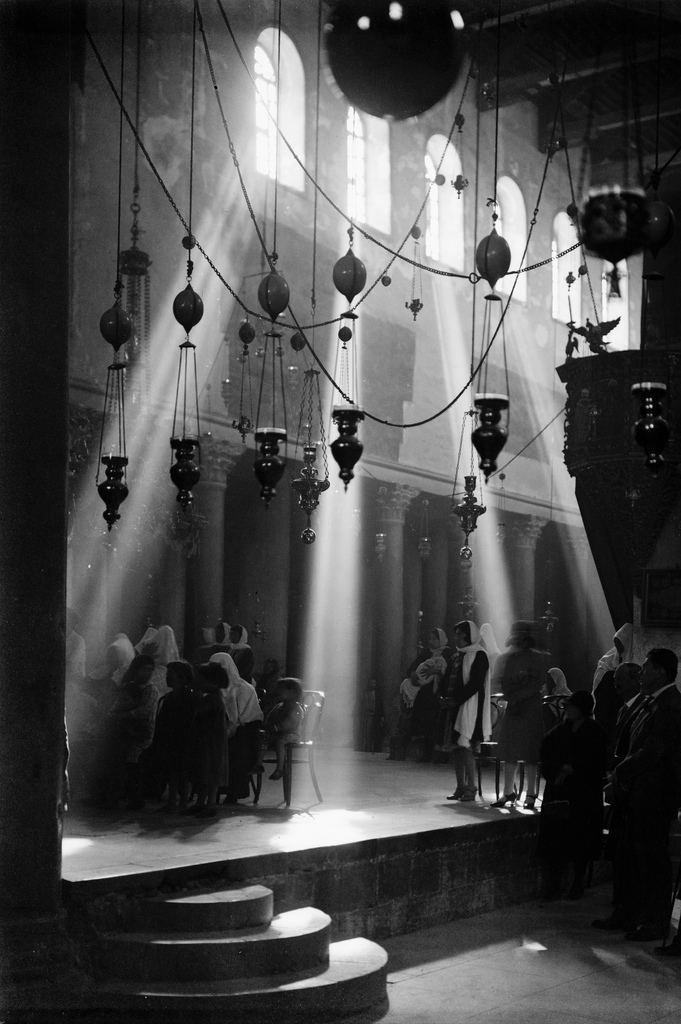
An American Colony photography by Lewis Larson of Christmas Services.

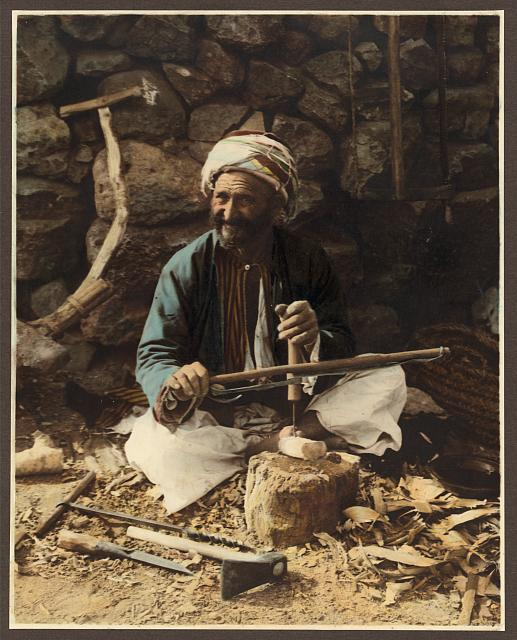
An American Colony Hand-coloured photography of a village carpenter.

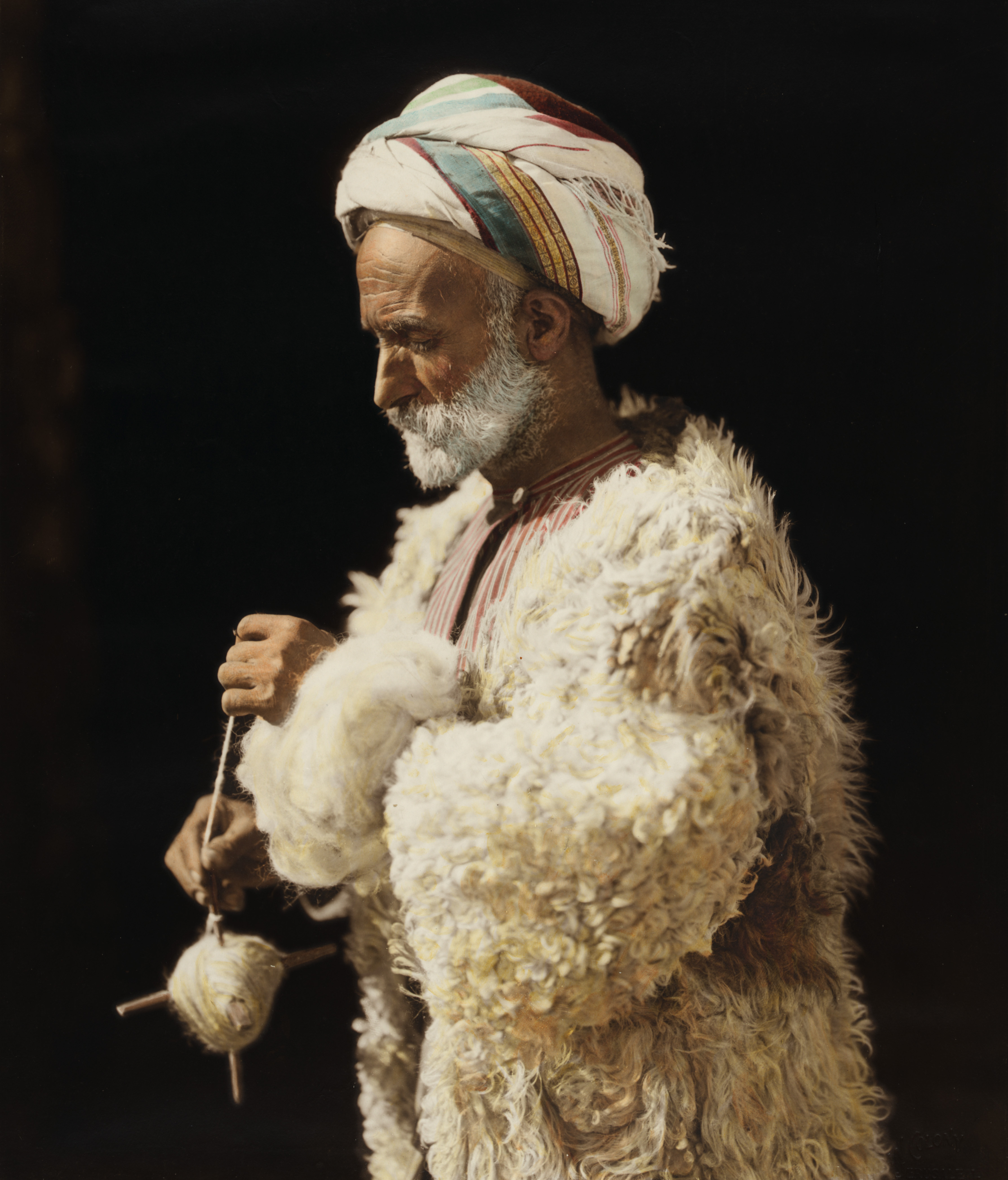
Hand-coloured photography example from the American Colony, peasant spinning wool in Ramallah (1919).
Source: Library of Congress

== See also ==
- Najib Albina

Diplomatic posts
Preceded by Gustaf Dalman	Honorary Consul of Sweden to Jerusalem; 1921–1947	Succeeded by Stig Möllerswärd
