= List of diplomatic missions in Palestine =

This is a list of diplomatic missions in Palestine, covering missions accredited to the State of Palestine or to the Palestinian National Authority (PNA). As Israel controls most of the Palestinian territories that make up the State of Palestine, most missions to the latter are officially termed Representative Offices due to Israel not recognizing a Palestinian state, although this is without prejudice to their official statuses. Most diplomatic missions to Palestine are resident in Ramallah, while a few countries maintain consulates or offices in East Jerusalem. Until 2007, some countries maintained their diplomatic missions to Palestine in Gaza City.

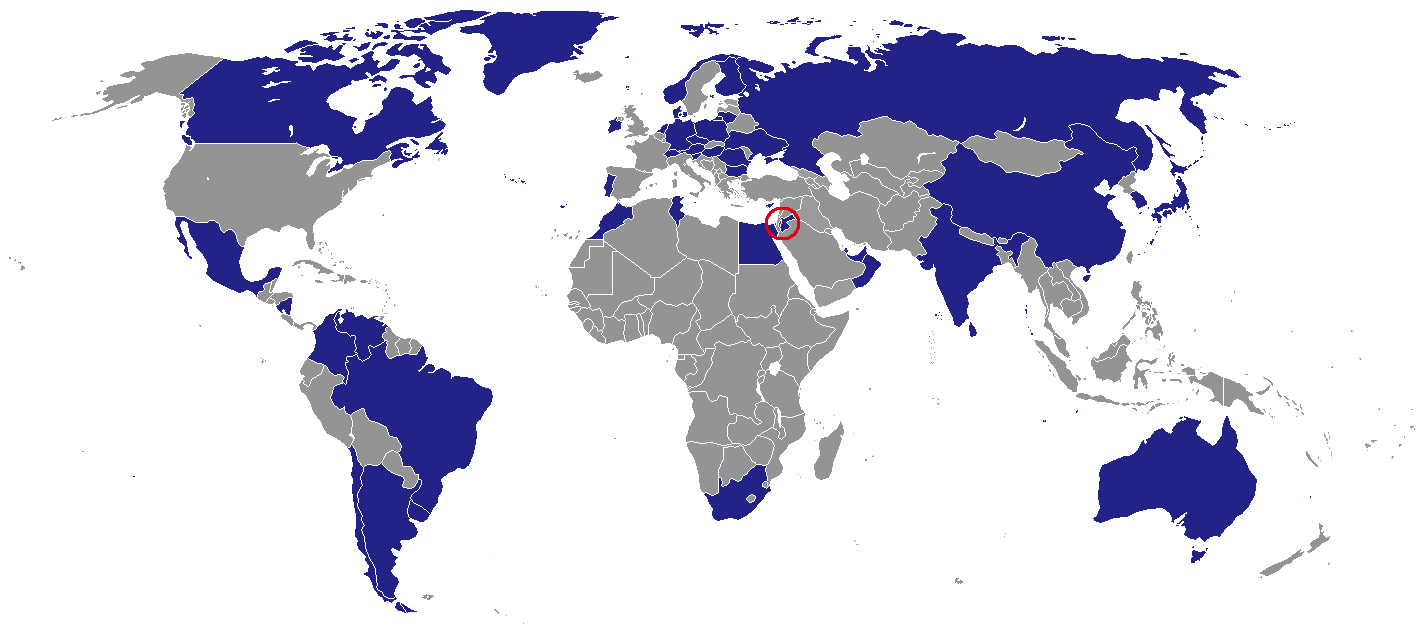
Map of diplomatic missions in the State of Palestine

== Diplomatic Missions in Ramallah ==
=== Embassies ===
1. Nicaragua
2. Oman
3. Uruguay
4. Venezuela

=== Representative offices ===
1. Argentina
2. Australia
3. Austria
4. Azerbaijan
5. Brazil
6. Bulgaria
7. Canada
8. Chile
9. China
10. Cyprus
11. Czech Republic
12. Denmark
13. Ecuador
14. Egypt
15. Finland
16. Germany
17. Hungary
18. India
19. Ireland
20. Japan
21. Jordan
22. Lithuania
23. Malta
24. Mexico
25. Morocco
26. Netherlands
27. Poland
28. Portugal
29. Romania
30. Russia
31. Singapore
32. Slovakia
33. Slovenia
34. South Africa
35. South Korea
36. Sri Lanka
37. Switzerland
38. Tunisia
39. Ukraine

=== Other delegations or posts ===
1. Organisation of Islamic Cooperation (Office)
2. UNESCO (Office)

== Diplomatic Missions in Gaza City ==
=== Representative offices ===
1. Qatar

== Diplomatic missions in East Jerusalem ==
=== Representative offices ===
1. European Union
2. Holy See (Apostolic Delegation)

=== Other delegations or posts ===
1. International Committee of the Red Cross (Delegation)

== Diplomatic missions in Bethlehem ==
=== Representative office ===
1. Sovereign Military Order of Malta

== Consulates-General ==
=== East Jerusalem ===
1. Belgium
2. France (article)
3. Greece
4. Italy
5. Spain
6. Sweden (article)
7. Turkey (Note: The Turkish Consul-General in Jerusalem is also accredited as “ambassador of Turkey to the State of Palestine”)

== Gallery ==
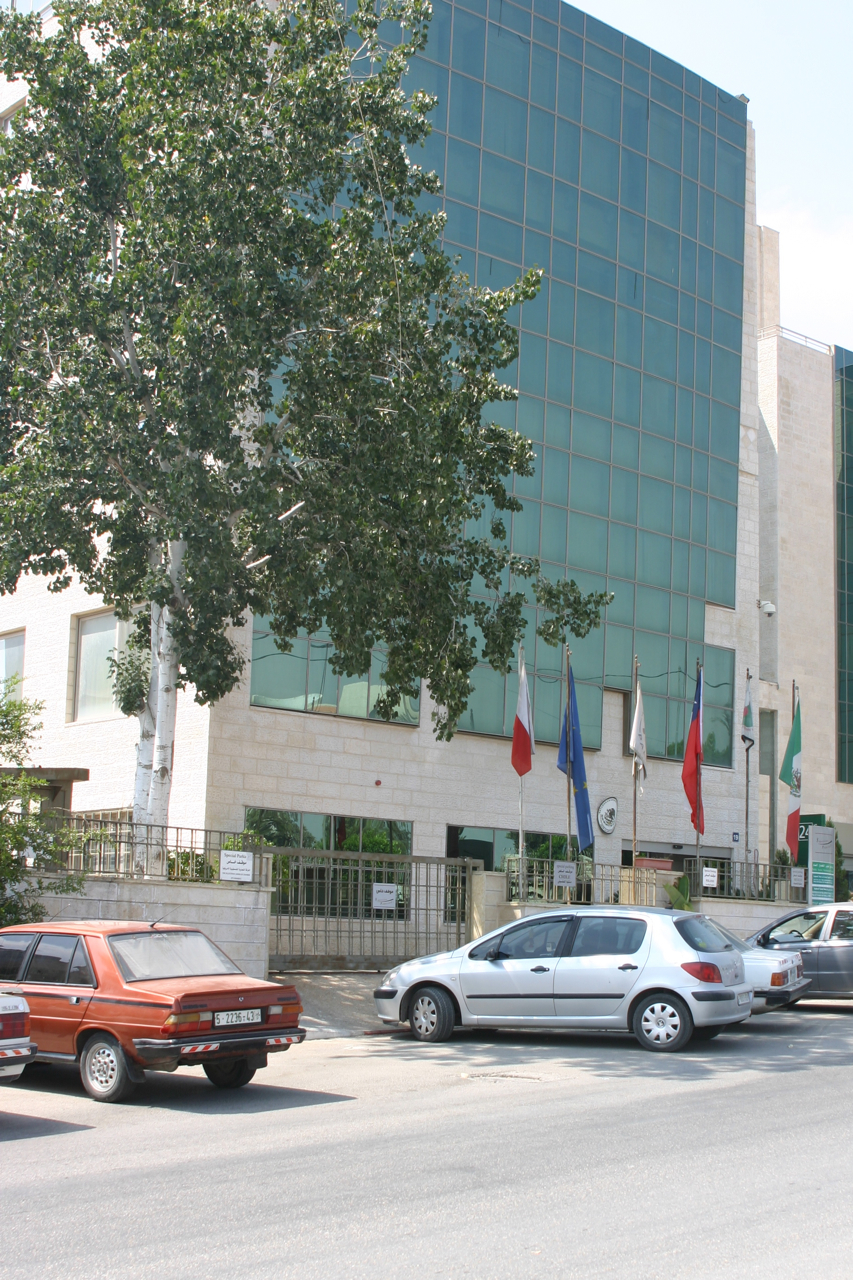
Building hosting the Representative offices of Chile, Malta, Mexico and Poland

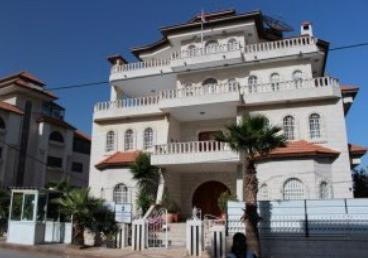
Representative office of India

== Non-resident missions accredited to Palestine ==
=== Resident in Amman, Jordan ===
1. Afghanistan
2. Bahrain
3. Bangladesh
4. Bosnia and Herzegovina
5. Brunei
6. Indonesia
7. Iraq
8. Kazakhstan
9. Kuwait
10. Malaysia
11. Pakistan
12. Panama
13. Philippines
14. Saudi Arabia
15. Sudan
16. Thailand
17. United Arab Emirates

=== Resident in Cairo, Egypt ===
1. Albania
2. Angola
3. Burkina Faso
4. Colombia
5. Congo-Brazzaville
6. Croatia
7. Cuba
8. Djibouti
9. Dominican Republic
10. Ghana
11. Guinea
12. Kenya
13. Malawi
14. Mali
15. Mauritania
16. Namibia
17. New Zealand
18. Niger
19. Nigeria
20. North Korea
21. Senegal
22. Serbia
23. Tanzania
24. Vietnam
25. Zambia

=== Resident elsewhere ===
1. Bolivia (The Hague)
2. Botswana (Kuwait City)
3. Costa Rica (The Hague)
4. El Salvador (Doha)
5. Estonia (Tallinn)
6. Iceland (Reykjavík)
7. Laos (Kuwait City)
8. Latvia (Riga)
9. Maldives (Riyadh)
10. Montenegro (Geneva)
11. Norway (Oslo)
12. Paraguay (Beirut)
13. Seychelles (Abu Dhabi)
14. Tajikistan (Ankara)
15. Turkmenistan (Riyadh)
16. Uganda (Tehran)
17. Zimbabwe (Ankara)

== Closed missions ==
Closed Diplomatic Missions
Country	City	Mission type	Closed year	Ref
Norway	Al-Ram	Representative Office	2024	

== See also ==
- List of consulates-general in Jerusalem
- List of diplomatic missions of Palestine
- Foreign relations of Palestine
