= Embassy of Sweden, Tel Aviv =

- Location: Tel Aviv
- Address: Visiting address: 2 Hashlosha Street; Adgar 360 Bldg, 24th floor Tel Aviv; Postal address: Embassy of Sweden; P.O.B. 9393; Tel Aviv 6109301; Israel
- Coordinates: 32.06170°N 34.78866°E
- Opened: 1951
- Ambassador: Alexandra Rydmark
- Jurisdiction: Israel
- Website: Official website

The Embassy of Sweden in Tel Aviv is Sweden's diplomatic mission in Israel. Sweden first recognized Israel de facto in 1949 and de jure in 1950, establishing a legation the following year with Gösta Hedengren as chargé d'affaires. The legation was elevated to embassy status in 1957. While Israel moved its Ministry of Foreign Affairs from Tel Aviv to Jerusalem in 1957, Sweden—like most countries—has kept its embassy in Tel Aviv, and the question of relocation has remained unresolved.

The embassy represents Sweden in Israel, maintains political dialogue, monitors developments, promotes trade, research, and cultural exchange, and provides consular services. It also manages Sweden's honorary consulates in Eilat and Haifa, while Sweden's Consulate General in Jerusalem reports directly to the Ministry for Foreign Affairs in Stockholm due to the city's special international status.

Since 1951 the chancery has moved several times within Tel Aviv and is currently located in the Adgar 360 building. The ambassador's residence has been situated in Herzliya Pituah since 1966, with the current property acquired in 1989 and upgraded over time, including the installation of solar panels enabling energy self-sufficiency.

== History ==
On 16 February 1949, Sweden recognized the State of Israel de facto, and in July 1950 Sweden's foreign minister, Östen Undén, telegraphed Israel's foreign minister that the Swedish government had decided to recognize the State of Israel de jure, and that the Swedish government was prepared to establish diplomatic relations with Israel. Six months later, in January 1951, the Swedish government decided that a diplomatic mission would be established in Israel, and Gösta Hedengren was appointed chargé d'affaires there.

Hedengren and his wife arrived on 2 April 1951 in Haifa aboard the Italian vessel Abbazia. They were received by representatives of the Israeli government and then traveled on to Tel Aviv, where he was to open the Swedish legation. Two days later, on 4 April, Gösta Hedengren presented his credentials to Dr. Walter Eytan at the Israeli Foreign Ministry. The Tel Aviv newspaper Maariv wrote then that "the appointment marks the end of the tragic Swedish–Israeli conflict that began with the assassination of Count Folke Bernadotte."

In July 1957, the Swedish Ministry for Foreign Affairs confirmed that Sweden—like the other countries that have diplomatic representation in Israel—had been notified that Israel's Ministry of Foreign Affairs had been moved on 12 July from Tel Aviv to Jerusalem. The Swedish Foreign Ministry had at that time been informed that the Swedish legation in Tel Aviv would later be given the opportunity to relocate to Jerusalem. The issue of relocation has been debated since 1957. As of 2026, the Swedish embassy remains located in Tel Aviv along with the majority of other countries' embassies in Israel.

In September 1957, an agreement was reached between the Swedish and Israeli governments on the mutual elevation of the countries' respective legations to embassies. The diplomatic rank was therefore changed to ambassador extraordinary and plenipotentiary instead of envoy extraordinary and minister plenipotentiary. In connection with this, Sweden's envoy to Israel, Östen Lundborg, was designated as ambassador.

== Staff and tasks ==
=== Tasks ===
The embassy's mission is to represent Sweden and to safeguard and promote Swedish interests in Israel. Its responsibilities include maintaining dialogue with the Israeli government, other public representatives, and civil society; monitoring and reporting on Israel's political and economic developments; and promoting Swedish trade, the economy, research, and culture.

Key tasks also include providing consular services to Swedes visiting or residing in Israel, as well as processing visa applications from foreign nationals wishing to travel to Sweden. Sweden also has two honorary consulates, located in Eilat and Haifa, both operating under the authority of the embassy in Tel Aviv. Sweden also maintains a Consulate General in Jerusalem, but due to the city's special status under international law, it does not fall under the authority of the Swedish Embassy in Tel Aviv. Like other consulates general in Jerusalem, it reports directly to the Swedish Ministry for Foreign Affairs rather than to an embassy.

== Buildings ==
=== Chancery ===
Between 1952 and 1953, the chancery was located at 5 Shilo Street, and subsequently at 18 Mapu Street from 1954 to 1957. From 1958 to 1965, the chancery was situated at 228 HaYarkon Street in the Old North district, after which, from 1966 to 1980, it was located at 198 HaYarkon Street.

Starting in 1981, the chancery was housed in the then newly built Asia House on 4 Weizmann Street in central Tel Aviv. It remained there for over 30 years before relocating in June 2015 to its current location on the 24th floor of the Adgar 360 building at 2 Hashlosha Street, in the Yad Eliyahu neighborhood in eastern Tel Aviv.

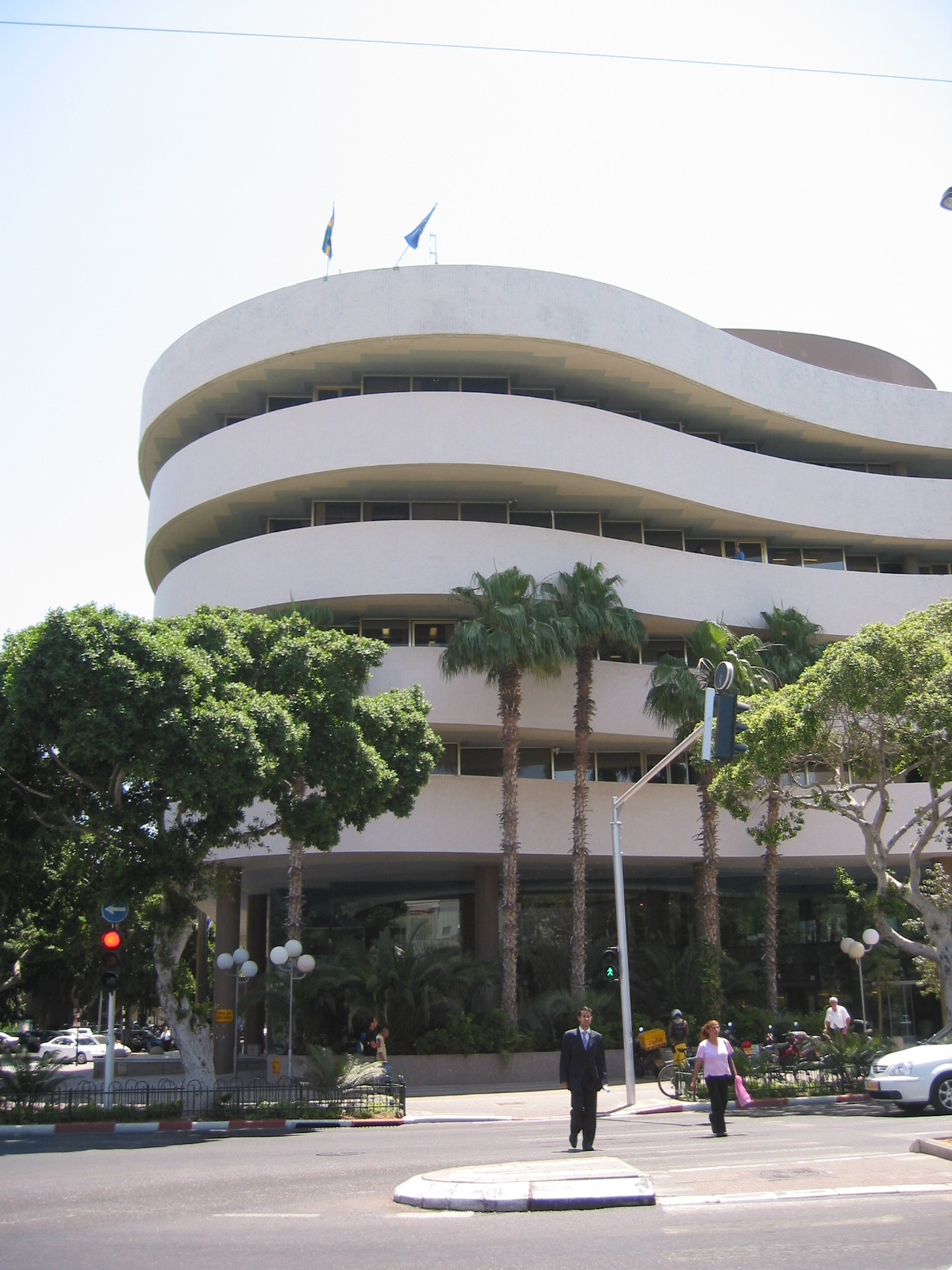
Asia House, 4 Weizmann Street
(1981–2015)

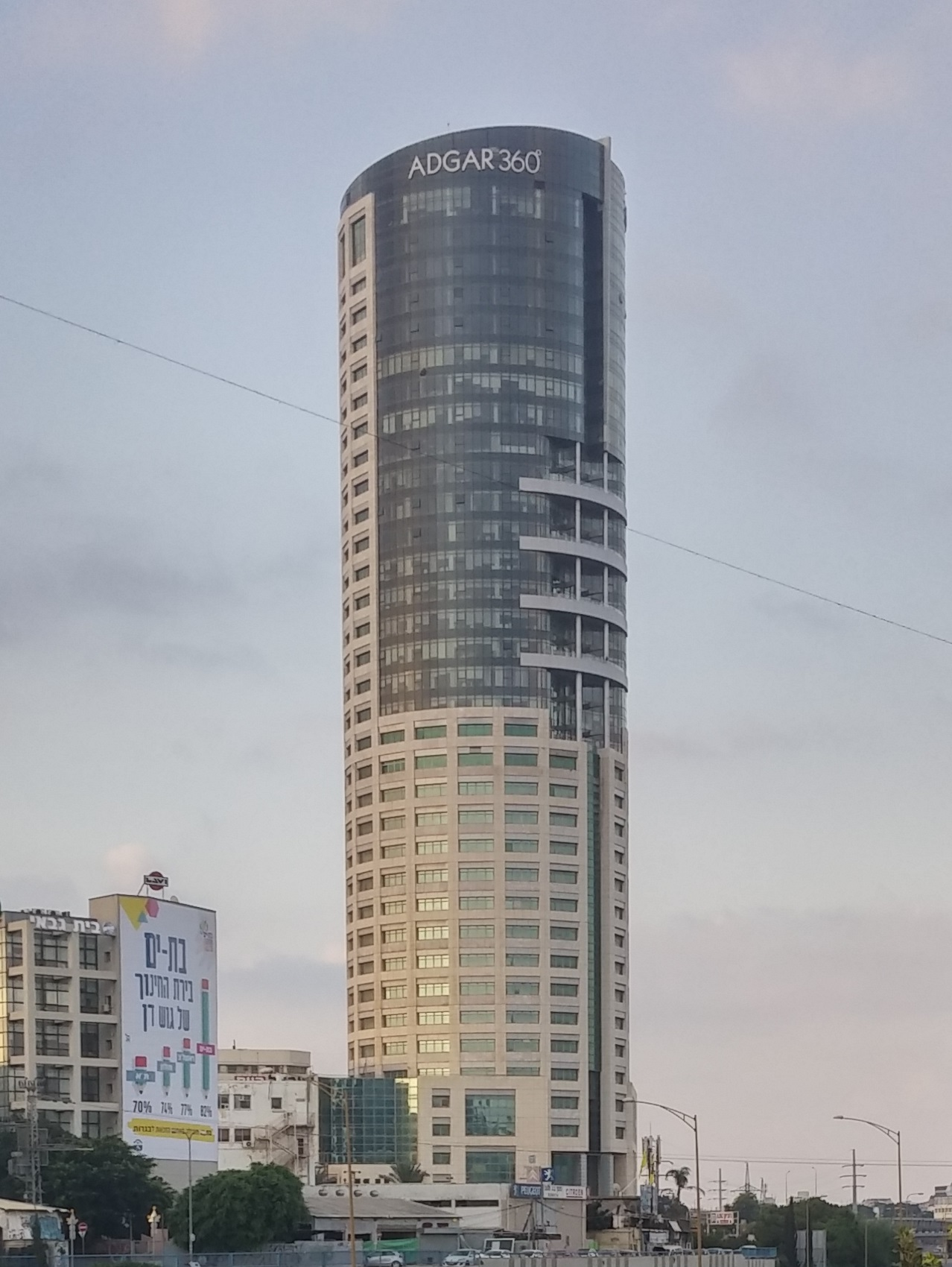
Adgar 360 building, 2 Hashlosha Street
(2015–present)

=== Residence ===
The ambassador's residence was located from at least 1965 to 1966 at 19 Ma'ale ha-Tsofim Street in the city of Ramat Gan in the Tel Aviv District. From 1966 onward, the residence was situated at 126 Ha-Eshel Street in the Herzliya Pituah neighborhood of the city of Herzliya, also in the Tel Aviv District.

Since 1989, the current residence has been located one street away from the previous one, at 93 Kaplan Street. It was purchased by the National Property Board of Sweden (SFV) in 1989 when the old residence—rented by the Ministry for Foreign Affairs since 1966—was to be sold. Among roughly twenty available properties in a limited market, SFV identified this property in the Herzliya Pituah area, where several embassies have established their residences.

The property consists of a mature, 1,042-square-meter plot terraced toward the street. In 1982, a rendered stone building was constructed here, featuring two levels on the street side and a single mid-level floor facing the garden. Heating is provided by an oil burner together with solar heating and heat pumps for hot-water production. Following certain alterations and extensions, most recently in 2012, the layout has become more functional and the building now serves as a distinguished residence for the Swedish Ambassador. In 2010, the SFV installed 120 square meters of solar panels on the residence's roof, enabling the property to be self-sufficient in electricity and to sell surplus power back to the city grid.

== See also ==
- Israel–Sweden relations
- Consulate General of Sweden, Jerusalem
