= Avigdor Dagan =

Czech-Israeli writer, playwright, literary translator and diplomat

- אביגדור דגן
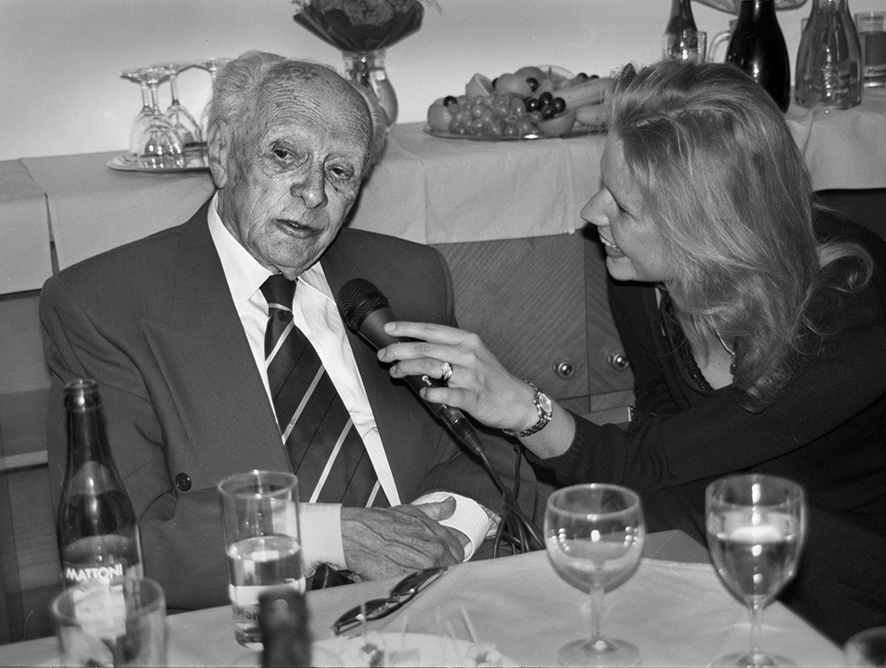
- Avigdor Dagan (nom de plume of Viktor Fischl), photograph by Jan Šplíchal
- Born: Viktor Fischl; 30 June 1912; Hradec Králové, Austria-Hungary
- Died: 28 May 2006 (aged 93); Israel
- Citizenship: Israeli
- Education: Charles University in Prague
- Occupations: Writer, playwright, literary translator and diplomat
- Writing career
- Notable work: Dvorní šašci

Avigdor Dagan (Hebrew: אביגדור דגן; born Viktor Fischl; 30 June 1912 – 28 May 2006) was a Czech-Israeli writer, playwright, literary translator, and diplomat. Prior to adopting the Hebraic name in 1955, his name was Viktor Fischl, Dagan, being related to the Hebrew word dag (fish), an approximate translation of Fischl as a diminutive of "fish".

== Life ==
After graduating from the Charles University in Prague, he entered the diplomatic service. In 1939 he emigrated to the United Kingdom to escape the Nazis, where he became an associate to Jan Masaryk. After the end of the war, he returned home, but on the 1948 coup d'état emigrated to Israel, thereafter changing his name to the one he held through the end of his life.

In Israel he continued his diplomatic career becoming plenipotentiary; he was the first Israeli ambassador to Austria in 1956, the Ambassador to Norway (and while based in Oslo, he was Ambassador to Iceland and Poland. At the same time he continued writing in Czech. Most of his prose was first published in Israel, some in England or in the US. In 1990 he visited his homeland for the first time since his fleeing for refuge. After a long break, publication resumed in his home country, and his works received broader recognition. He was awarded the honorary doctorate from the Charles University.

Although he was able to be employed as a diplomat and produce output as an author at the same time, from 1977 onward he devoted his time solely to writing. In his lifelong literary career, he started out as a poet, then later became known as a writer of collections of short stories and novels. He is known for his modern Czech translations of Psalms and the Song of Songs. His works were translated from Czech into Hebrew as well as other languages; his best known novel Dvorní šašci (The Court Jesters) was translated into 12 languages.

== Selected works ==
- Jaro (Spring) (1933)
- Kniha nocí (1936)
- Hebrejské melodie (Hebrew tunes) (1936)
- Evropské žalmy (London, 1941)
- Mrtvá ves (London, 1943)
- Anglické sonety (1946)
- Písen o lítosti (1948)
- Kuropění (The Cock's Crow) (1975)
- The Clock of Human Form (1982)
- Dvorní šašci (The Court Jester, 1990, Japanese translation: 2001)
- Kafka of Jerusalem (1996)
- Poezie Starého zákona (Tales of an Old Silk Hat) (1998)

=== Non-fiction ===
- Hovory s Janem Masarykem (Conversations with Jan Masaryk, 1952 in the USA)
