= Israel–Sweden relations =

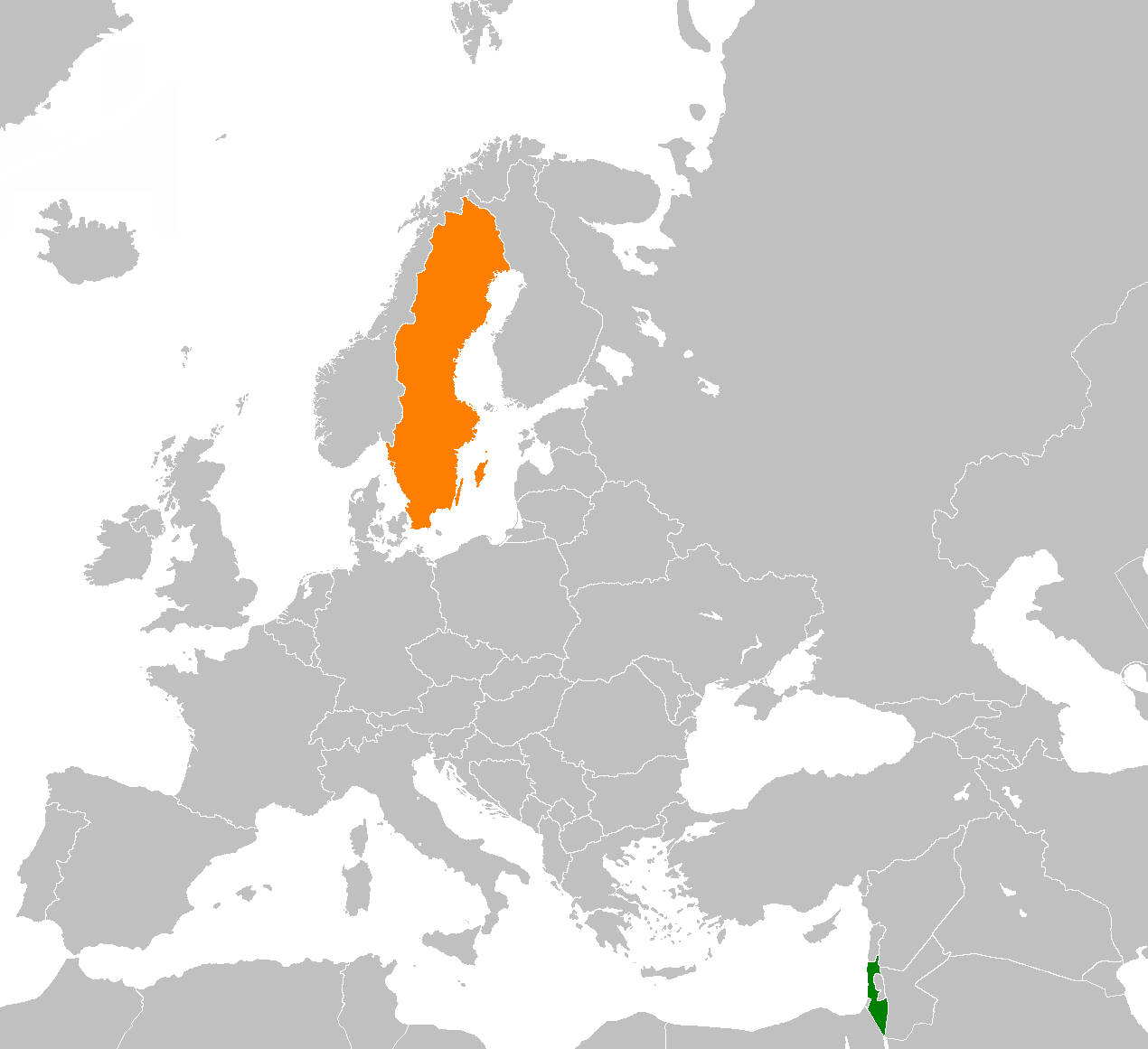
- Israel: Sweden

Israel–Sweden relations refers to the bilateral relations between Israel and Sweden. Israel has an embassy in Stockholm while Sweden has an embassy in Tel Aviv, and honorary consulates in Eilat and Haifa. The diplomatic relations between the two countries were briefly damaged when Sweden became the first member of the European Union to recognize the State of Palestine in 2014. Previously, other members had recognized Palestine, but that was before they joined the EU.

== History ==
Sweden voted in favor of the United Nations Partition Plan for Palestine proposed by UNSCOP (chaired by Swedish lawyer Emil Sandström) in 1947, which provided the legal foundation of the creation of the State of Israel, and offered the services of Count Folke Bernadotte, a Swedish diplomat and nephew of the then-reigning King Gustaf V of Sweden, to assist the United Nations in negotiations between Arab and Palestinian residents. The Swedish nobleman arranged a shaky truce between the new State of Israel and Arab neighbors who had mounted an attack on it in May 1948, then attempted to secure a more lasting peace. On 17 September 1948, a Zionist militant group, Lehi, also known as the Stern Gang, assassinated Bernadotte. The assassination was directed by Yehoshua Zettler and carried out by a four-man team led by Meshulam Makover. The fatal shots were fired by Yehoshua Cohen. The United Nations Security Council described the assassination as a "cowardly act which appears to have been committed by a criminal group of terrorists". Lehi saw Bernadotte as a British and Arab puppet, and thus a serious threat to the emerging State of Israel, and feared that the provisional Israeli government would accept his plan, which it considered disastrous.

Shortly after the assassination, the Israeli government passed the Ordinance to Prevent Terrorism and declared Lehi to be a terrorist organization. Many Lehi members were arrested, including leaders Nathan Yellin-Mor and Matitiahu Schmulevitz. The Israeli Prime Minister, David Ben-Gurion, quickly outlawed Lehi as "a gang of rogues, cowards and low schemers," but five months later, he declared a general amnesty and released them all. Sweden believed that the assassination was planned by the government of Israel rather than independent terrorists and found the investigation and consequences inadequate to the crime. The police investigation was not initiated until 24 hours after the assassination, and according to Israeli historian Amitsur Ilan, the investigation was "amateurish." It was not until 1995 that Shimon Peres officially expressed "regret that he was killed in a terrorist way". Sweden, for its part, tried to delay the admission of the state of Israel into the United Nations. Relations between Sweden and Israel remained chilled as a result of the assassination and Israel's amnesty for the perpetrators.

On 16 February 1949, Sweden recognized the State of Israel de facto, and in July 1950, de jure. In January 1951, the Swedish government decided to establish a diplomatic mission in Israel, and Gösta Hedengren was appointed as the chargé d'affaires there.

Relations between Sweden and Israel were good during the 1950s and 1960s, during Tage Erlander's tenure as Prime Minister of Sweden. Erlander expressed strong support for Israel during the Six-Day War.

Olof Palme, who succeeded Erlander as Swedish Prime Minister and leader of the Social Democratic Party in 1969, was more critical of the United States and its allies, including Israel. In 1969, the Social Democratic Party adopted a neutral stance in the Israeli–Palestinian conflict. The new policy was justified by the Swedish diplomat Gunnar Jarring's position as the United Nations Secretary-General's special envoy in the conflict (the so-called Jarring Mission).

In October 1973, during the Yom Kippur War, Sweden's Minister for Foreign Affairs Krister Wickman criticized Israel and said the problems in the Middle East could not be solved by military superiority. In June 1981, Sweden condemned Israel's attack on the Osirak nuclear reactor in Iraq as a "clear violation of international law". In July 1982, after Israel's invasion of Lebanon, Prime Minister Olof Palme compared Israel's treatment of Palestinian children to Nazi Germany's treatment of Jewish children in the Nazi concentration camps and ghettos of World War II. In December 1988, Palestine Liberation Organization chairman Yasser Arafat visited Stockholm by invitation of the Swedish government. After two days of negotiations, Arafat announced that he would now accept Israel's right to exist and he denounced all forms of terrorism.

In October 1999, Swedish Prime Minister Göran Persson visited Israel, offering to broker the Middle East peace process. Persson's visit was the first official visit for a Swedish Prime Minister since Tage Erlander's visit in 1962.

In January 2004, Israel's ambassador to Sweden Zvi Mazel vandalized a piece of artwork by Swedish-Israeli artist Dror Feiler on display at the Swedish Museum of National Antiquities in Stockholm, presenting a portrait of Palestinian suicide bomber Hanadi Jaradat as "Snow White." Mazel's actions sparked a diplomatic incident between the two countries.

During the 2006 Lebanon War, Minister for Foreign Affairs Jan Eliasson condemned both the actions of Hezbollah and the Israeli response. During the Gaza War in January 2009, Minister for Foreign Affairs Carl Bildt criticised Israel and called for an immediate ceasefire.

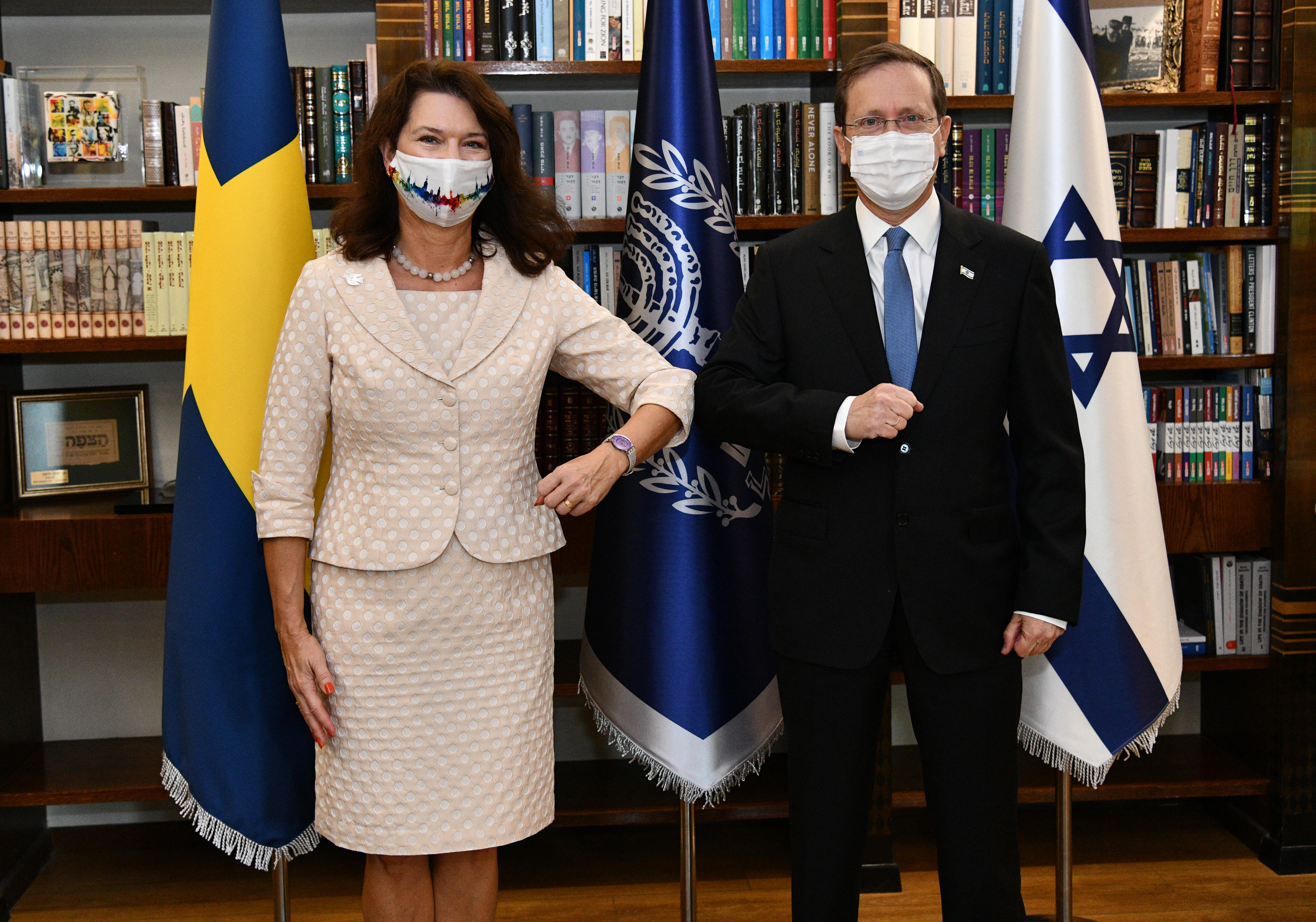
Swedish Minister of Foreign Affairs Ann Linde with Israeli President Isaac Herzog, 2021

In August 2009, a diplomatic row erupted after the publication of an article in the Swedish daily Aftonbladet that claimed the Israel Defense Forces had engaged in organ harvesting from dead Palestinians. Israel called on the Swedish government to condemn the article, which it described as a "manifestation of antisemitism" and a modern "blood libel". The Swedish government refused, citing freedom of the press and the country's constitution.

In October 2014, the newly elected Swedish Social Democratic Party-led government of Stefan Löfven announced it would recognize the state of Palestine saying that "the conflict between Israel and Palestine can only be solved with a two-state solution... A two-state solution requires mutual recognition and a will to peaceful co-existence. Sweden will therefore recognise the state of Palestine." In response, Foreign Minister Avigdor Lieberman's office said that "he regrets that the new prime minister was in a hurry to make statements on Sweden's position regarding recognition of a Palestinian state, apparently before he had time even to study the issue in depth" and that the Swedish ambassador would be summoned to have a "conversation" on the issue. Lieberman also stated "Löfven had hastened to make declarations ... apparently before he could delve into the matter and understand it is the Palestinians who have constituted the obstacle to progress" in reaching a peace accord with Israel. Then he called on Löfven "to focus on more burning problems in the region such as the daily mass-killings going on in Syria, Iraq and elsewhere". Israel recalled its ambassador to Sweden, Isaac Bachman, for consultation but he returned to Sweden a month later. In December, Liberman announced his plan to boycott the visit anticipated by his Swedish counterpart, and added that, "Relations in the Middle East are a lot more complex than the self-assembly furniture of IKEA." Swedish Foreign Minister Margot Wallström responded to Liberman with the comment, "I will be happy to send him a flat pack of IKEA furniture and he will also see that what you need to put that together is, first of all, a partner. And you also need to cooperate and you need a good manual and I think we have most of those elements." It was announced in January 2015 that she has cancelled her visit until further notice. The purpose of the visit had been primarily to honor Raoul Wallenberg, the diplomat from Sweden who saved tens of thousands of Jews from being sent to concentration camps by issuing them Swedish papers during World War II.

In November 2022, the newly appointed Swedish Foreign Minister Tobias Billström called the 2014 Palestine recognition 'premature and unfortunate’.

On 14 July 2023, the Swedish police confirmed the burning of a Tanakh in front of the Israeli embassy in Stockholm which was planned to take place on 15 July. After the confirmation of the event, condemnations were published by Israeli president Isaac Herzog, Prime Minister Benjamin Netanyahu, foreign minister Eli Cohen, Chief Rabbis of Israel and certain ministers in the Israeli government. However on 15 July, the person who intended to burn the religious scripture decided not to, and instead held a peaceful protest about not burning holy scriptures.

In January 2024, the Swedish police prevented an attack on the Israeli embassy in Sweden, after a grenade was found near the embassy.

== Commercial and trade ties ==
The Swedish clothing chain H&M opened its first store in Tel Aviv in 2010, followed by five more stores across the country. More stores are planned for the Gush Dan area.

In 2014, Israel exported a total of US$185 million to Sweden, mainly in the field of electronics, while Sweden exported US$491 million to Israel, mainly vehicles and machinery.

Israel - Sweden trade in millions USD-$
	Israel imports Sweden exports	Sweden imports Israel exports	Total trade value
2023	1108.7	119.7	1228.4
2022	1126.5	169.3	1295.8
2021	782.3	148.3	930.6
2020	706.5	158.5	865
2019	729.9	130	859.9
2018	714.4	172.7	887.1
2017	806.4	160.1	966.5
2016	495.2	145.5	640.7
2015	451.7	147.9	599.6
2014	521.4	182.4	703.8
2013	636.2	165.7	801.9
2012	653	155.4	808.4
2011	573.4	193.3	766.7
2010	552.4	165.7	718.1
2009	523.1	121	644.1
2008	693.6	181.9	875.5
2007	556	171.5	727.5
2006	443.4	126.6	570
2005	365.1	134.9	500
2004	328.7	112.1	440.8
2003	313.9	91.5	405.4
2002	313.6	104.8	418.4

== Cultural ties ==
The Sweden–Israel Friendship Association is a Swedish-based organization that works to promote cultural ties between Israel and Sweden. It was established in Stockholm in 1953, with local branches opening in Gothenburg and Malmö the following year. Today the association comprises 26 local branches with a membership of 3,000.

== Public opinion ==
According to a 2025 Pew Research Center survey, 20% of people in Sweden had a favorable view of Israel, while 75% had an unfavorable view; 18% had confidence in Israeli Prime Minister Benjamin Netanyahu, while 78% did not.

== Resident diplomatic missions ==
- Israel has an embassy in Stockholm.
- Sweden has an embassy in Tel Aviv.
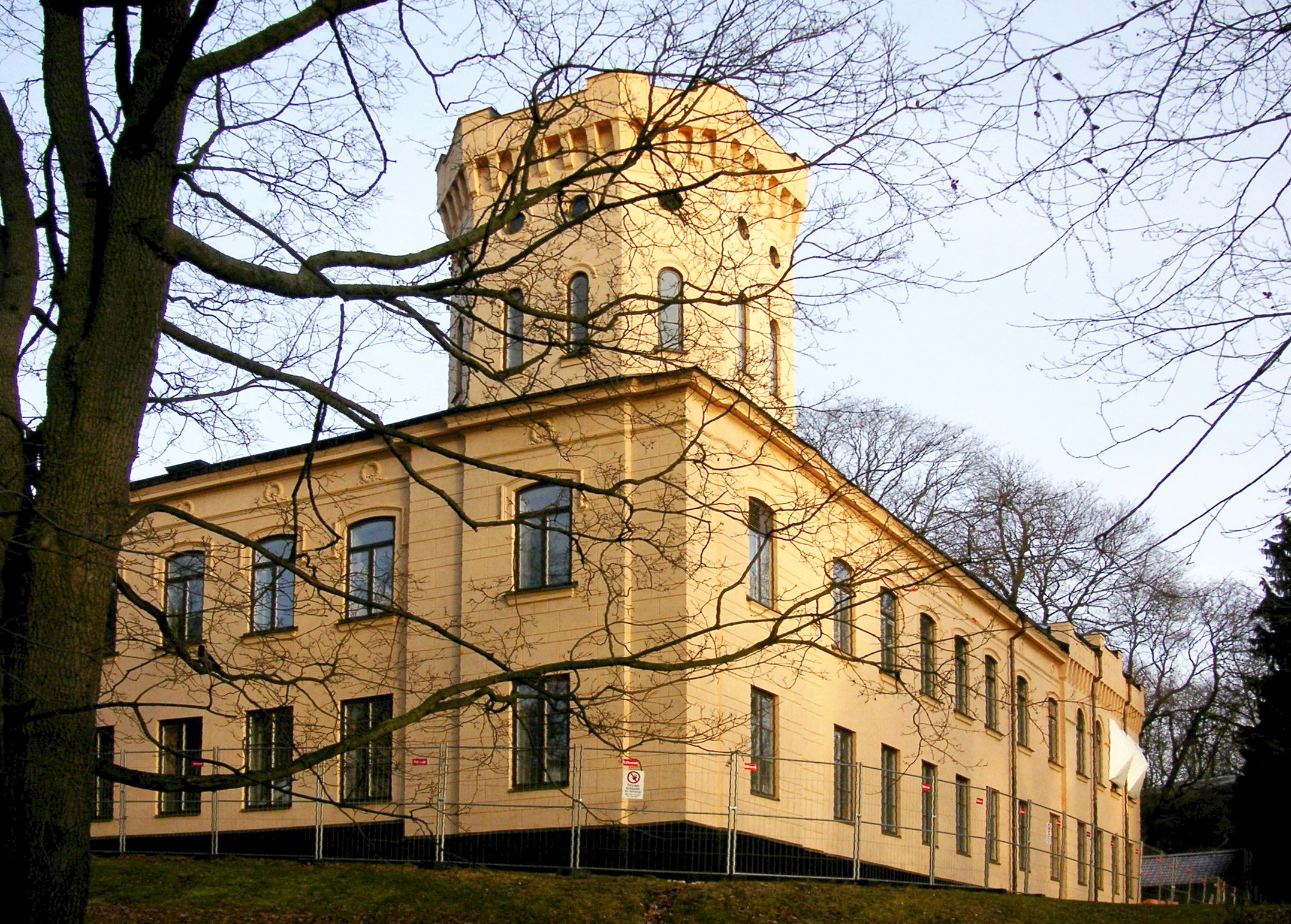
Embassy of Israel in Stockholm

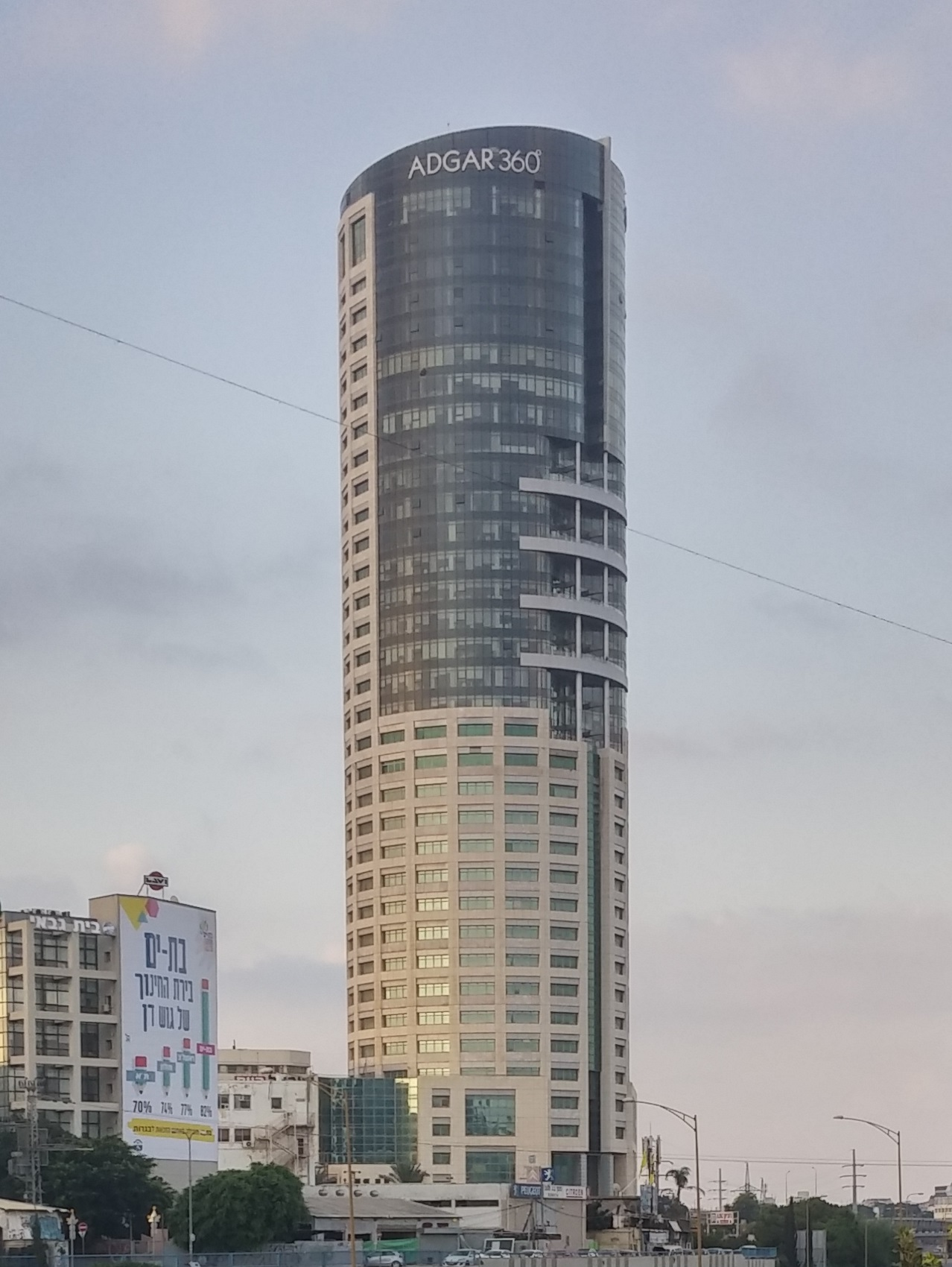
Embassy of Sweden in Tel Aviv

== See also ==
- Foreign relations of Israel
- Foreign relations of Sweden
- Israel-EU relations
- Palestine-Sweden relations
- 2009 Aftonbladet Israel controversy
- Snow White and The Madness of Truth
- History of the Jews in Sweden
- List of ambassadors of Israel to Sweden
