= Hava Hareli =

Israeli diplomat

Hava Hareli (Hebrew: חוה הראלי; 1917–2008) was an Israeli diplomat and ambassador who served in a variety of positions including members of the permanent mission to the UN, Ambassador to Norway and Ambassador to Iceland (concurrent appointment 1978–1981). She also served as Deputy Permanent Representative to the Office of the United Nations at Geneva. Hareli also served as a translator Involved in the trial of Adolf Eichmann.

She was on the Israeli delegation to the United Nations from at least 1958–1964.

Hareli was born in Vienna, Austria-Hungary.
