= Leni Yahil =

German-born Israeli historian, specializing in the Holocaust & Danish Jewry (1912-2007)

Leni Yahil (Hebrew: לני יחיל; 1912–2007), née Leni Westphal, was a German-born Israeli historian, specializing in the Holocaust and Danish Jewry.

== Early life ==
Leni was born in Düsseldorf, Germany, in 1912, and was raised in Potsdam, Germany. She was a sixth-generation descent of Moses Mendelssohn's family, as well as a granddaughter of James Simon. Her father, Ernst Westphal, was a judge. Yahil studied history at the universities of Munich and Berlin. Afterwards, she was accepted into the Hochschule für die Wissenschaft des Judentums (College of Judaic Studies) in Berlin, but had her education interrupted by the Nazi rise to power in Germany in 1933. She joined a Jewish youth movement called Werkleute (Workmen) and eventually became one of its leaders. She emigrated to Palestine in 1934, and was eventually able to resume her college education by studying at the Hebrew University, where she majored in general history, with a dual minor in Jewish history and Hebrew literature. She received her master's degree in 1940, with her thesis being about “The Concept of Democracy in Tocqueville.” In 1942, Leni married Chaim Hoffman (later Yahil; 1905–1974), later having two sons with him – Amos (born 1943) and Jonathan (1945–1967).

== Academic career and later life ==
After her studies, Yahil engaged in various cultural, political and journalistic activities (1940–1947, 1949–1953) in the labor movement and the women’s section of the Histadrut (Israeli labor federation), and in various positions at Davar (the Histadrut’s daily newspaper). At one point, Yahil also edited the English-language monthly newspaper, News from Israel.

Between 1954 and 1956, Yahil "served as academic secretary to her university teacher Professor Benzion Dinur, Israel’s first Minister of Education and Culture (1951–1955). Yahil submitted her doctoral dissertation, The Jews of Denmark During the Holocaust, to the Hebrew University of Jerusalem in 1964, getting her PhD one year later.

In the late 1960s and 1970s, Yahil worked as a lecturer and professor at various universities in Israel and the United States, teaching about modern Jewish history, the Holocaust and Zionism. In addition to all of this, she was an "editor of the section on Scandinavian Jewish literature in the Encyclopaedia Judaica, was a member of the editorial board of the Encyclopedia of the Holocaust and the Yad Vashem Studies series, and participated in international conferences in Israel and abroad."

Yahil received several prizes and awards for her work and research throughout her career. Yahil's masterpierce, "in terms of content and scope, was The Holocaust: The Fate of European Jewry (1932–1945), published in Hebrew (1987), in English (1990) and in German (1998)." This "book consists of three sections: the first part focuses on the Jews of Germany from 1932–1939; the second analyzes the spreading of the persecution in the East and West as part of the world war; this leads into the third and largest section, dealing with the Holocaust itself (1941–1945), which includes units on the countries of southern Europe and the overseas European territories, such as Vichy North Africa, and Italian Libya." Meanwhile, the "final three chapters highlight the problem of rescue." Unlike some earlier major Holocaust historians (such as Raul Hilberg and Gerald Reitlinger), Yahil used both Jewish and non-Jewish sources for her research, including for her masterpiece work.

Until 2004, Yahil was a member of the editorial board of Yad Vashem Studies, where she advocated for an approach to Holocaust research that relied on both Jewish and non-Jewish sources. She continued to be active in research and studying new developments into her old age.

Leni Yahil died in Israel in 2007, at the age of 94 or 95.

== Awards ==
- 1991: National Jewish Book Award in the Holocaust category for The Holocaust: The Fate of European Jewry, 1932-1945
