= Palestine–Sweden relations =

- Palestine: Sweden

Palestine–Sweden relations are bilateral relations between the State of Palestine and the Kingdom of Sweden. Sweden recognized Palestine as a sovereign state on 30 October 2014. Palestine has an embassy in Stockholm, which opened in February 2015.

== History ==
Sweden voted in favor of the United Nations plan for the partition of Palestine in 1947. Folke Bernadotte, a Swede, was a United Nations mediator in the Arab–Israeli conflict and put forward a peace plan before he was assassinated in 1948 by the Zionist terrorist group Lehi, who accused him of favoring the Arabs. During the 1980s, Sweden also mediated the US's lifting of the ban on holding direct talks with the PLO.

== Recognition ==
In October 2014, Sweden recognised Palestinian statehood after the Social Democratic Party won a plurality in the 2014 general election and becomes first European Union member in Nordic countries to make move, saying we hope this will show the way for others. Palestinians and their supporters welcomed Sweden's decision, viewing it as a significant step towards achieving international recognition for Palestine.

In late 2022, the Swedish foreign minister Tobias Billström called the 2014 recognition of Palestine "premature and unfortunate".

== See also ==
- Foreign relations of Palestine
- Foreign relations of Sweden
- Folke Bernadotte
- Israel–Sweden relations
