= José Alcalá Galiano =

Spanish writer, poet and humorist

José Alcalá Galiano (1843–1919) was a Spanish writer, poet and humorist.

== Works ==
=== Translations ===
- Dramatic Poems by Lord Byron: Cain. Sardanapalus. Manfred. (1886)
- Manfred by Lord Byron (1861).
- Sardanapalus, Madrid, 1886.
- Cain: Mysteries of the Old Testament, by Lord Byron, Imp. de S. Landáburu, 1873
- The Tragic History of Doctor Faustus by Christopher Marlowe; Madrid, V. Suárez, 1911.
