= Nås =

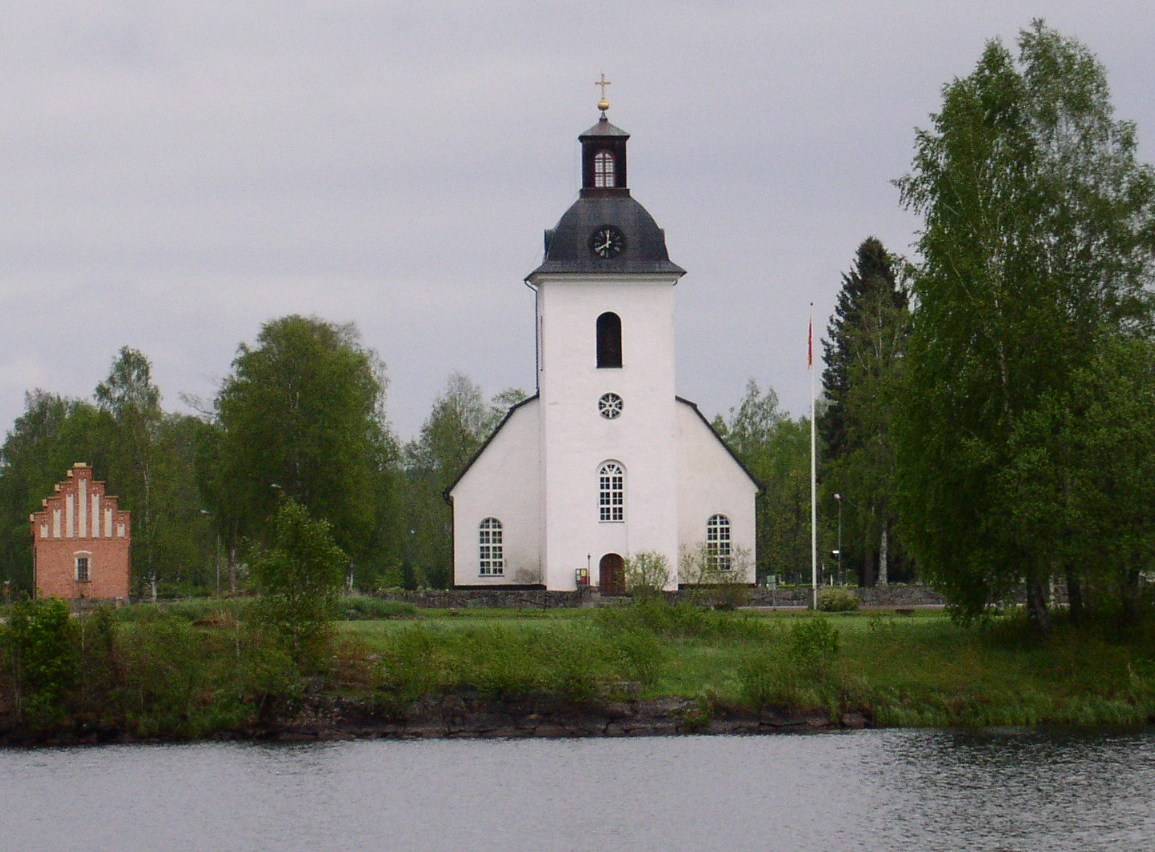
- Nås Church

- Location within Dalarna Location within Sweden
- Coordinates: 60°27′N 14°29′E
- Country: Sweden
- Province: Dalarna
- County: Dalarna County
- Municipality: Vansbro Municipality

Area
  - Total: 1.71 km^{2} (0.66 sq mi)

Population (31 December 2010)
  - Total: 417
  - Density: 244/km^{2} (630/sq mi)
- Time zone: UTC+1 (CET)
  - Summer (DST): UTC+2 (CEST)

Nås is a locality situated in Vansbro Municipality, Dalarna County, Sweden with 417 inhabitants in 2010.

It was the birthplace of Lewis Larsson and provided inspiration for Selma Lagerlöf's novel Jerusalem.
