= List of consulates-general in Jerusalem =

Map of countries with consulates-general in Jerusalem

Currently, seven countries maintain consulates-general in Jerusalem: Belgium, France, Greece, Italy, Spain, Sweden, and Turkey. The Consulate General of the United States in Jerusalem was merged into the Embassy of the United States in 2019. To this list, one usually includes the Vatican (Holy See), which maintains an "Apostolic Delegation to Jerusalem and Palestine" in Jerusalem.

Some consulates-general in Jerusalem have jurisdiction over the Palestinian territories (the West Bank, including East Jerusalem, and the Gaza Strip), and their heads act as representatives to the Palestinian Authority.

These consulates are not diplomatic missions to Israel: the countries possessing consulates-general in Jerusalem maintain their embassies to Israel in Tel Aviv, and it is their ambassador in Tel Aviv that presents letters of credence to the president of Israel.

== History ==
Having consulates-general in Jerusalem not accredited to any host government is a result of the unresolved issue of the status of Jerusalem. Under the United Nations Partition Plan of 1947, Jerusalem was to become a corpus separatum under international control, separate from both the Jewish state and the Arab one whose creation the partition plan envisaged; that would have logically entailed various countries having a separate diplomatic representation in Jerusalem. While the corpus separatum idea was never implemented, the status of Jerusalem remains disputed and unresolved. The international community never recognized the declaration of Jerusalem as Israel's capital in 1949 or the annexation of East Jerusalem to Israel in 1967. Thus, the anomalous Jerusalem consulates serve as a convenient way for various countries to have a diplomatic presence in the city without recognizing such Israeli "accomplished facts".

The United States maintained a consulate general in Jerusalem between 1844 and 2019, which was also responsible for conducting relations with Palestinians. After the United States relocated its Embassy from Tel Aviv to Jerusalem in 2018, the consulate general was formally merged into the US Embassy in early 2019, ending the US practice of accrediting separate missions to the Israelis and Palestinians. Most of its former responsibilities were assumed by a new Palestinian Affairs Unit which now works inside the embassy in Jerusalem.

== List of missions ==
All countries with consulates-general in Jerusalem include the contacts with the Palestinian National Authority in the consulate-general's responsibilities. All countries with consulates-general in Jerusalem have separate embassies in Tel Aviv that are accredited to Israel.

- Belgium, in East Jerusalem
- France, Consulate General of France in Jerusalem
- Greece, with offices in West Jerusalem (listed under "Israel" on Ministry of Foreign Affairs website) and in East Jerusalem
- Holy See, Apostolic Delegation to Jerusalem and Palestine, in East Jerusalem
- Italy, with offices in both East and West Jerusalem
- Spain, Consulate General of Spain in East Jerusalem
- Sweden, Consulate General of Sweden in East Jerusalem
- Turkey, in East Jerusalem; the Turkish Consul General in Jerusalem is also accredited as the Ambassador of Turkey to the State of Palestine

Several more countries are represented by Jerusalem-based honorary consuls.

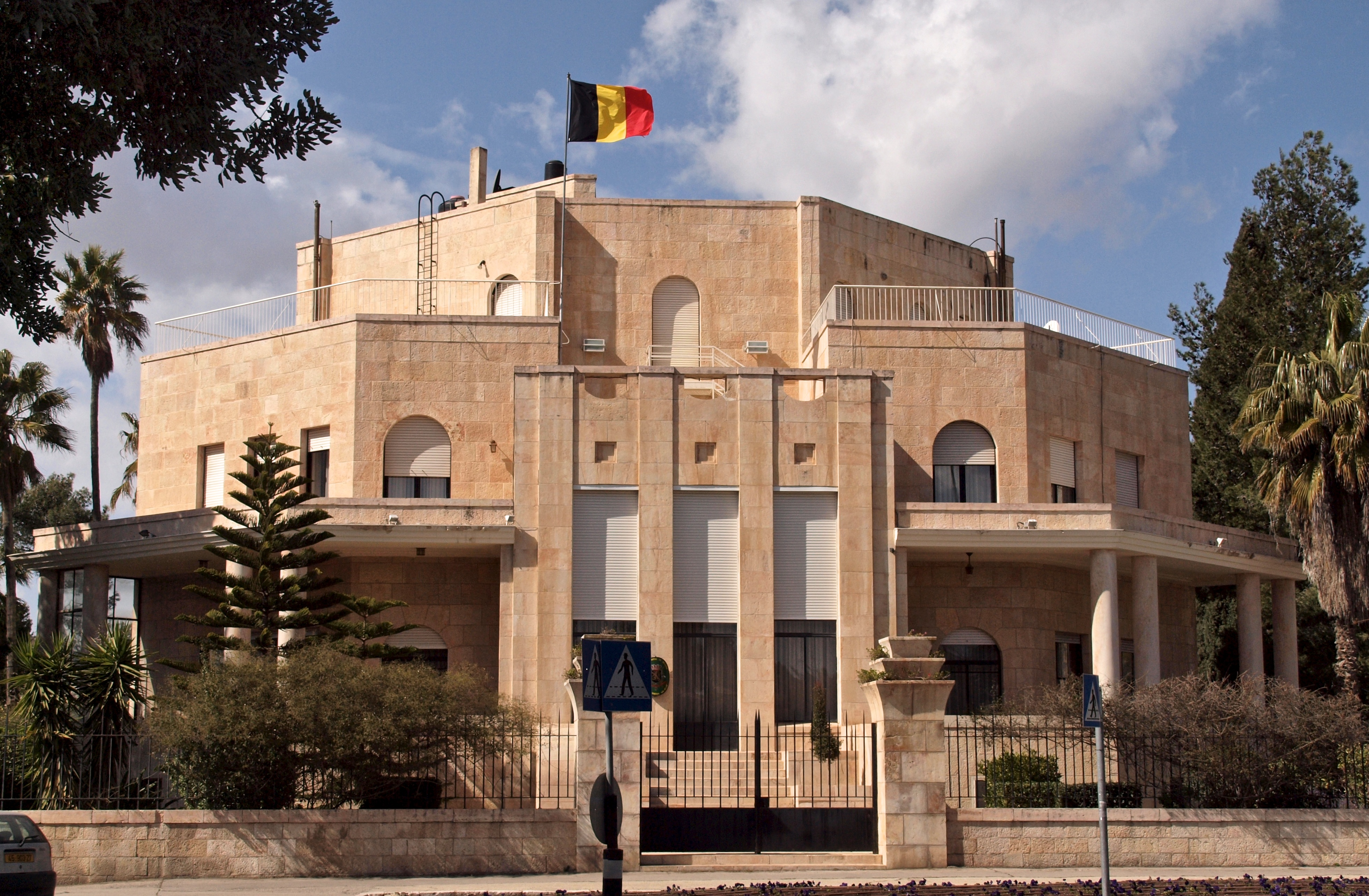
Belgian Consulate

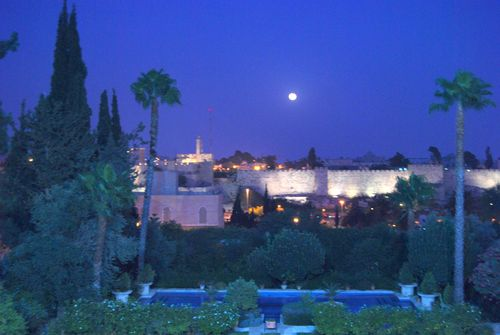
Consulate General of France, Jerusalem

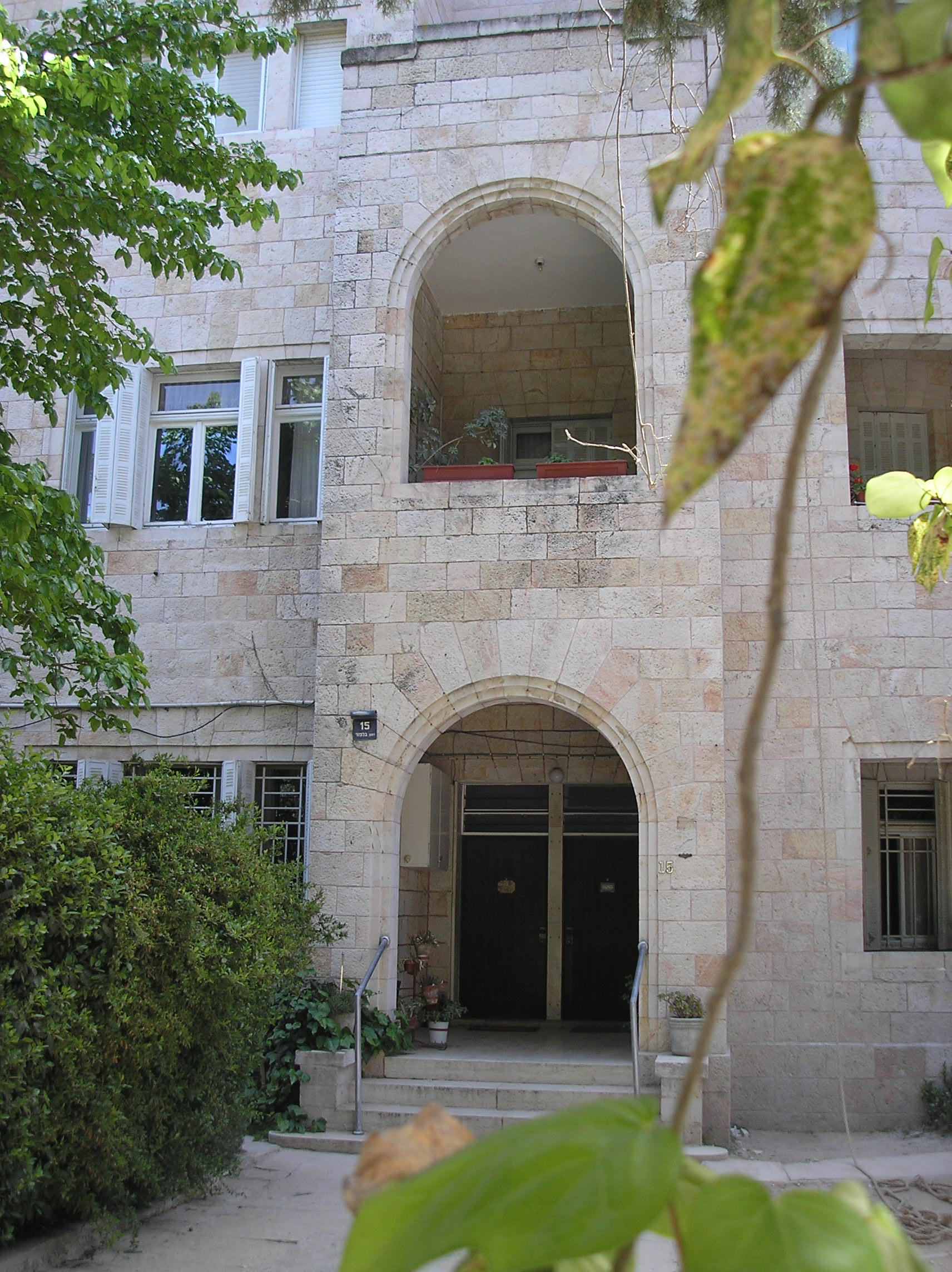
Turkish Consulate

=== Former missions ===
- Ethiopia – Ethiopian Consulate General in Jerusalem on 38, Street of the Prophets in West Jerusalem (open from 1928–1973)
- / Germany – German Consulate-General in Jerusalem on 57, Street of the Prophets in Jerusalem (open from 1842–1917 and from 1926–1939)
- Russia – Russian Consulate General in Jerusalem in the Russian Compound on 2, Shivtei Yisrael Street in Jerusalem (open from 1858–1914)
- United States – Consulate General of the United States in Jerusalem on 18, Gershon Agron Street in Jerusalem (open from 1844–2019, merged into the Embassy of the United States in 2019)
- United Kingdom – Consulate general of the United Kingdom in Jerusalem on 15 Nashashibi Street, Jerusalem (open from 1838–1914 and 1948–2026)

== See also ==
- List of diplomatic missions in Israel
- List of diplomatic missions in Palestine
