= Gustaf Dalman =

German writer and explorer of Palestine

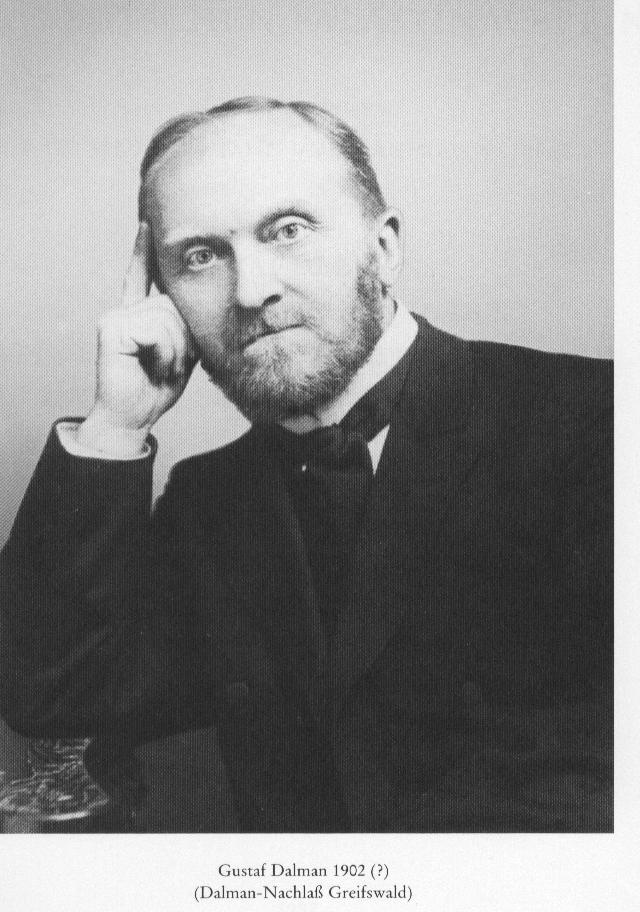
- Born: June 9, 1855; Niesky
- Died: August 19, 1941 (aged 86); Herrnhut

Gustaf Hermann Dalman (9 June 1855 – 19 August 1941) was a German Lutheran theologian and orientalist. He did extensive field work in Palestine before the First World War, collecting inscriptions, poetry, and proverbs. He also collected physical articles illustrative of the life of Palestinian peasantry and herders of the country, including rock and plant samples, house and farm tools, small archaeological finds, and ceramics. He pioneered the study of biblical and early post-biblical Aramaic, publishing an authoritative grammar (1894) and dictionary (1901), as well as other works. His collection of 15,000 historic photographs and 5,000 books, including rare 16th century prints, and maps formed the basis of the Gustaf Dalman Institute at the Ernst Moritz Arndt University, Greifswald, which commemorates and continues his work.

== Background ==
Dalman was appointed by Kaiser Wilhelm II as director of the Deutsches Evangelisches Institut für Altertumswissenschaft des heiligen Landes zu Jerusalem (German Evangelical Institute for Ancient Studies of the Holy Land in Jerusalem), where he served from 1902 to 1917. Dalman experienced the outbreak of World War I on a home leave in Germany. Events prevented a return to Jerusalem. From 1917 he was Professor of Old Testament and Palestine Studies in Greifswald, where in 1920 he founded the Institute for Biblical Geography and Antiquity (today: Gustaf Dalman Institute). In 1921 he was acting provost of the Church of the Redeemer in Jerusalem. From 1905 to 1926 he was editor of the journal Palästinajahrbuch des Deutschen Evangelischen Instituts für Altertumswissenschaft des Heiligen Landes zu Jerusalem (Palestine Yearbook of the German Evangelical Institute for Archeology of the Holy Land in Jerusalem).

In his detailed appreciation of contemporary Palestinian customs and agricultural practices, Dalman was not limited to biblical illustrations or the recording of Arabic terms but took his examples to the pre-monotheistic past, as did other ethnographers of the time. In the preface to Volume 1, Dalman alerts the reader to this: "Whoever undertakes such a task as a theologian cannot let himself be seduced by concentrating only on those points that at a first and perhaps very superficial glance seem to show biblical connections. How often does a closer look show that the connections point in another direction? It is also not permitted to report in the descriptions only those aspects that contribute to explaining biblical expressions and statements." Throughout his text, he provides examples of how the most ancient customs are preserved by farmers across Palestine and Egypt, aspects that have either been forgotten owing to modernization and continuing conflict in this region that began with World War I.

Dalman drew his wealth of knowledge on Palestinian agriculture and peasant life from his extensive communications with Tawfiq Canaan, enlarging on the same with other academic sources, such as the cosmographical work of Zakariya al-Qazwini, and the botanical works of George Edward Post and Immanuel Löw.

The theologian and translator Franz Delitzsch, who translated the New Testament into Hebrew, entrusted to Dalman the work of "thoroughly revising" the Hebrew text.

== Works ==
- Grammatik des Jüdisch-Palästinischen Aramäisch. 1894. 2nd edition. Leipzig, 1905
- Aramäische Dialektproben: unter dem Gesichtspunkt neutestamentlicher Studien (mit Wörterverzeichnis) Leipzig, 1896 (reprint: OCLC 892092418)(OCLC 9238720)
- Dalman, Gustaf (1898). Christentum und Judentum (in German). Leipzig: J. C. Hinrichs'sche Buchhandlung. OCLC 903085144.
  - Dalman, Gustaf (1901). Christianity and Judaism: an Essay. Translated by Box, G.H. Oxford: Williams & Norgate. OCLC 688537829.
- Dalman, Gustaf (1898). Die Worte Iesu: Mit Berücksichtigung des Nachkanonischen Jüdischen Schrifttums und der Aramäischen Sprache (in German). Leipzig: J. C. Hinrichs'sche Buchhandlung.
  - Dalman, Gustaf (1902). The Words of Jesus: Considered in the Light of Post-Biblical Jewish Writings and the Aramaic Language. Translated by Kay, D. M. Edinburgh: T. & T. Clark.
- Dalman, Gustaf (1901). Palästinischer Diwan: Als Beitrag zur Volkskunde Palästinas (in German). Leipzig: J. C. Hinrichs'sche Buchhandlung. (volume of Palestinian folksong, folk-tunes and dialect poetry, Arabic text with German translation collected by Dalman 1899-1900)
- Dalman, Gustaf (1912). Neue Petra-Forschungen und der Heilige Felsen von Jerusalem (New Petra explorations and the sacred rock of Jerusalem) (in German). Leipzig: J.C. Hinrichs. ISBN 978-1385969557. OCLC 583405432.
- Jesus-Jeschua. Leipzig, 1922. English trans., Jesus-Jeshua. Studies in the Aramaic Gospels. London, 1929.
- Dalman, Gustaf (1925). Hundert deutsche Fliegerbilder aus Palästina (One Hundred German Aerial Photographs from Palestine). Schriften des Deutschen Palästina-Instituts, Bd. 2 (in German). Gütersloh: Bertelsmann. OCLC 774111.
- Arbeit und Sitte in Palastina. [Work and Customs in Palestine] 1937. Reprinted 1964. (in 7 volumes)
- Dalman, Gustaf (2013). Work and Customs in Palestine. Vol. 1 (I/1-I/2). Translated by Nadia Abdulhadi Sukhtian. Ramallah: Dar Al Nasher. ISBN 9789950385-00-9. OCLC 1040774903. (ISBN 9789950385-01-6) (two volumes)
- Dalman, Gustaf (2020). Nadia Abdulhadi-Sukhtian (ed.). Work and Customs in Palestine, volume II. Vol. 2 (Agriculture). Translated by Robert Schick. Ramallah: Dar Al Nasher. ISBN 978-9950-385-84-9.
- Dalman, Gustaf (1930). Jerusalem und sein Gelände (Jerusalem and its Grounds) (in German). Gütersloh: C. Bertelsmann. OCLC 408213.
- Dalman, Gustaf (1935). Sacred Sites and Ways: Studies in the Topography of the Gospels. London: Society for Promoting Christian Knowledge. OCLC 287887. (being a translation of: Orte und Wege Jesu)
- Dalman, Gustaf (1938). Aramäisch-Neuhebräisches Handwörterbuch zu Targum, Talmud und Midrasch (in German). Göttingen. OCLC 80365504.
  - Aramäisch-Neuhebräisches Handwörterbuch zu Targum, Talmud und Midrasch. 1901. 2nd revised and expanded edition. Frankfurt am Main, 1922 (OCLC 806982104)
- Dalman, Gustaf (1964). Webstoff, Spinnen, Weben, Kleidung (Woven fabric, spinning, weaving, clothing). Deutsches Evangelisches Institut für Altertumswissenschaft des Heiligen Landes.; Schriften des Deutschen Palästina-Instituts (in German). Hildesheim: Olms. OCLC 180617734. (reprinted from 1937 edition)

=== Articles ===
- Dalman, Gustaf (1891). "Ein neues hebräisches Reisehandbuch für Palästina (A New Hebrew Travel Guide to Palestine)". Zeitschrift des Deutschen Palästina-Vereins (in German). 14. Deutscher verein zur Erforschung Palästinas: 148–150. JSTOR 27928609.
- Dalman, Gustaf (1897). "Aramäische Dialektproben (Aramaic dialect samples)". Monatsschrift für Geschichte und Wissenschaft des Judentums (in German). 41 (N. F. 5) (7): 326–329. JSTOR 44758678.
- Dalman, Gustaf (1902). "Grinding in Ancient and Modern Palestine". The Biblical World. 19 (1). The University of Chicago Press: 9–18. doi:10.1086/472938. JSTOR 3137192. S2CID 144466504.
- Dalman, Gustaf (1904). "Studien aus dem Deutschen evang. archäolog. Institut zu Jerusalem. 1. Der Paß von Michmas (The pass of Michmas)". Zeitschrift des Deutschen Palästina-Vereins (in German). 27. Deutscher verein zur Erforschung Palästinas: 161–173. JSTOR 27928847.
- Dalman, Gustaf (1905). "Studien aus dem Deutschen evang. archäolog. Institut zu Jerusalem. 4. Pflügelänge, Saatstreifen und Erntestreifen in Bibel und Mischna (Plow length, seed strips and harvest strips in the Bible and Mishnah)". Zeitschrift des Deutschen Palästina-Vereins (in German). 28 (1). Deutscher verein zur Erforschung Palästinas: 27–35. JSTOR 27928875.
- Dalman, Gustaf (1905). "Studien aus dem Deutschen evang. archäolog. Institut zu Jerusalem. 5. Getreidemaß und Feldmaß (Grain measure and field measure)". Zeitschrift des Deutschen Palästina-Vereins (in German). 28 (1). Deutscher verein zur Erforschung Palästinas: 36–39. JSTOR 27928876.
- Dalman, Gustaf (1909). "Der zweite Tempel zu Jerusalem (The second temple in Jerusalem)". Palästina-Jahrbuch (in German). 5. Jerusalem: G. Dalman.
- Dalman, Gustaf (1909). "Notes on the Old Hebrew Calendar-Inscription From Gezer" (PDF). Palestine Exploration Fund Quarterly Statement. 41 (2). Jerusalem: Palestine Exploration Fund: 118–119. doi:10.1179/peq.1909.41.2.118.
- Dalman, Gustaf; Dinsmore, J.E. (1911). "Die Pflanzen Palästinas (The plants of Palestine)". Zeitschrift des Deutschen Palästina-Vereins (in German). 34 (1). Deutscher verein zur Erforschung Palästinas: 1, 3–38. JSTOR 27929030.
- Dalman, Gustaf (1922). "Die Ausgrabungen von Raymond Weill in der Davidsstadt (Raymond Weill's excavations in the City of David)". Zeitschrift des Deutschen Palästina-Vereins (in German). 45 (1/2). Deutscher verein zur Erforschung Palästinas: 22–31. JSTOR 27929432.
- Dalman, Gustaf (1923). "Studien aus dem Deutschen evang. Institut für Altertumswissenschaft in Jerusalem. 34. Palästinische Tiernamen (Palestinian animal names)". Zeitschrift des Deutschen Palästina-Vereins (in German). 46 (1/2). Deutscher verein zur Erforschung Palästinas: 65–78. JSTOR 27929464.
- Dalman, Gustaf (1929). "Einige Geschichtliche Stätten Im Norden Jerusalems (Some historical sites in the north of Jerusalem)". Journal of Biblical Literature (in German). 48 (3/4). The Society of Biblical Literature: 354–361. doi:10.2307/3259735. JSTOR 3259735.

== See also ==
- Tawfiq Canaan
- Lewis Larsson
