= List of ambassadors of Israel to Sweden =

== List of ambassadors ==
- Tamar Rahamimoff Honig 2026
- Ziv Nevo Kulman 2021-2026
- Ilan Ben-Dov (diplomat) 2017 - 2021
- Isaac Bachman 2012 - 2017
- Benny Dagan 2008 - 2012
- Eviatar Manor 2004 - 2008
- Zvi Mazel 2002 - 2004
- Eliyahu Avidan 1999 - 2002
- Gideon Ben-Ami 1994 - 1999
- Amnon Ben-Yochanan 1990 - 1994
- Moshe Yagar 1988 - 1990
- Moshe Erell 1984 - 1988
- Abraham Avidar 1980 - 1984
- Mordecai Kidron 1977 - 1980
- Avner Idan 1973 - 1976
- Mesholam Veron 1969 - 1973
- Ephraim Evron 1968 - 1969
- Yaacov Shimoni 1964 - 1968
- Moshe Bitan 1962 - 1964
- Arie Aroch 1959-1962
- Ambassador Chaim Yahil 1956 - 1959
- Minister Avraham Nissan 1950 - 1956
