= Gonzalo Diéguez y Redondo =

Spanish diplomat (1897–1955)

Gonzalo Diéguez y Redondo Conde de Diéguez

Spanish Ambassador to Jordan of Spain to Jordan
- In office May 1949 to – 7 June 1955
- Succeeded by: 1983-1987: Emilio Menéndez; 1991: Juan Manuel Cabrera Hernández; March 1997-27 March 2001: Eudaldo Mirapeix; March 2001- 2006 Antonio López Martínez; 12 October 2012:Javier Sangro; 18 March 2014: Santiago Cabanas Ansorena (Madrid, 1954)

Personal details
- Born: 1 January 1897 Palencia
- Died: 7 June 1955 (aged 58) Madrid
- Education: studied laws (Miembro de la Academia de Jurisprudencia.)

Gonzalo Diéguez y Redondo (1897–1955) was a Spanish diplomat.

== Career ==
- In 1920 he entered the foreign service of the Kingdom of Spain.
- He was employed in Sète and Perpignan, Guatemala, Oslo and Sidi Bel Abbès.
- On 16 August 1927 he was Secritary of the Conference in Lisbon, where a Spanish-Portuguese agreement was signed, which establishes the conditions for the hydroelectric exploitation of the Douro.
- From 1933 to January 1948 he had Exequatur as Consul General in Rosario, Santa Fe (Argentina).
- From January 1948 to May 1949 he had Exequatur as Consul General in Jerusalem with personal rang as Minister Plenipotentiary 3rd class.
- From May 1949 to 7 June 1955 he was Minister of legation/ ambassador in Amman.

== Decorations ==
- Great Cross of the Order of Civil Merit (1952)
