= Chaim Yahil =

Israeli diplomat

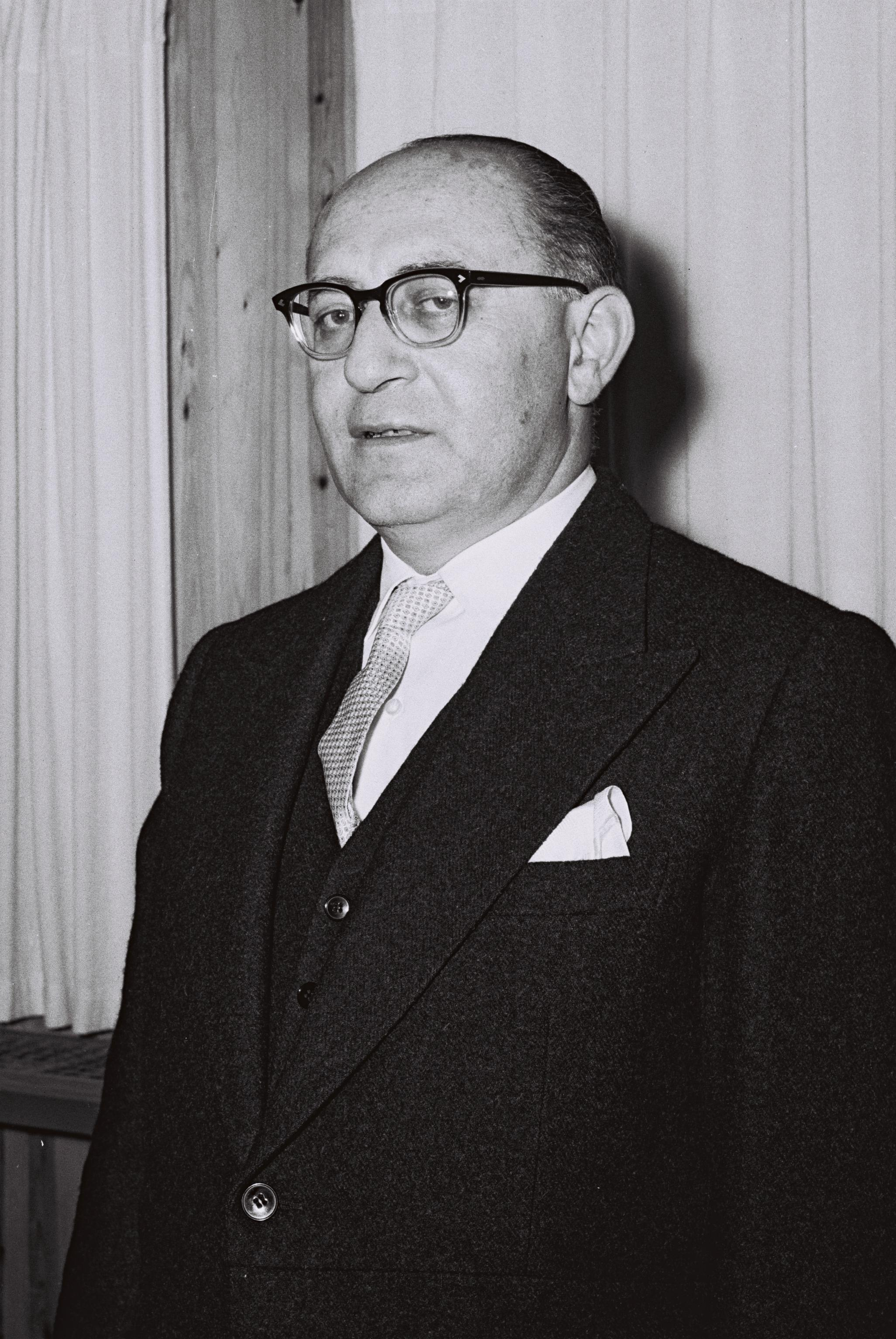
Chaim Yahil, 1960

Chaim Yahil (Hebrew: חיים יחיל; 1905–1974) was an Israeli diplomat.

== Biography ==
Chaim Hoffmann (later Yahil) was born in the town of Wallachisch Meseritsch in Moravia, then part of the Austro-Hungarian Empire (today: Valašské Meziříčí, in the Czech Republic). In post-World War I Czechoslovakia he was active in the Zionist youth movement Blau-Weiss, founding a local branch in his hometown and later serving on the movement's national council.

Yahil immigrated to Mandatory Palestine in 1929 and joined Kibbutz Giv'at Hayim. After a short stay he returned to Europe, completing his Ph.D. in political science in Vienna. He worked for the Zionist movement in Prague and published his first book (under the name Chajim Hoffmann), a history of the Zionist labor movement in Palestine (Träger der Verwirklichung: die zionistische Arbeiterschaft im Aufbau) in 1937/1938.

In 1943 Yahil married Leni Westphal, who had immigrated to Palestine from Germany in 1934, and, as Leni Yahil, went on to become a historian specializing in the Holocaust and Danish Jewry. They had two sons, Amos (b. 1943) and Jonathan (b. 1945-d. 1967).

== Public and diplomatic career ==
On his return to Palestine in 1939 Yahil served as Histadrut Director of Education Haifa until 1942. From 1942 to 1945 was a member of the Histadrut Executive committee. In 1945 Yahil was the Jewish Agency representative in Munich Germany. After the Israeli Declaration of Independence Yahil became the Israeli Consul in Munich until 1949. In 1949 Yahil returned to Israel joining the Jewish Agency Department of Absorption as director in Jerusalem. In 1951 Yahil was appointed as head of Information Department in the Israeli Ministry of Foreign Affairs until 1953. In 1956 Yahil became the minister to Scandinavian countries later serving as the Israeli Ambassador to Sweden and minister to Norway and Iceland. In 1960 Yahil took the post of Director General of Ministry of Foreign Affairs. From 1965 until 1972 Yahil was Chairman of the Israeli Broadcasting Authority and until his death in 1974 was the leader of the "Whole land of Israel" movement.
