= Yehudith Huebner =

Israeli civil servant and diplomat (1921–2023)

- יהודית היבנר
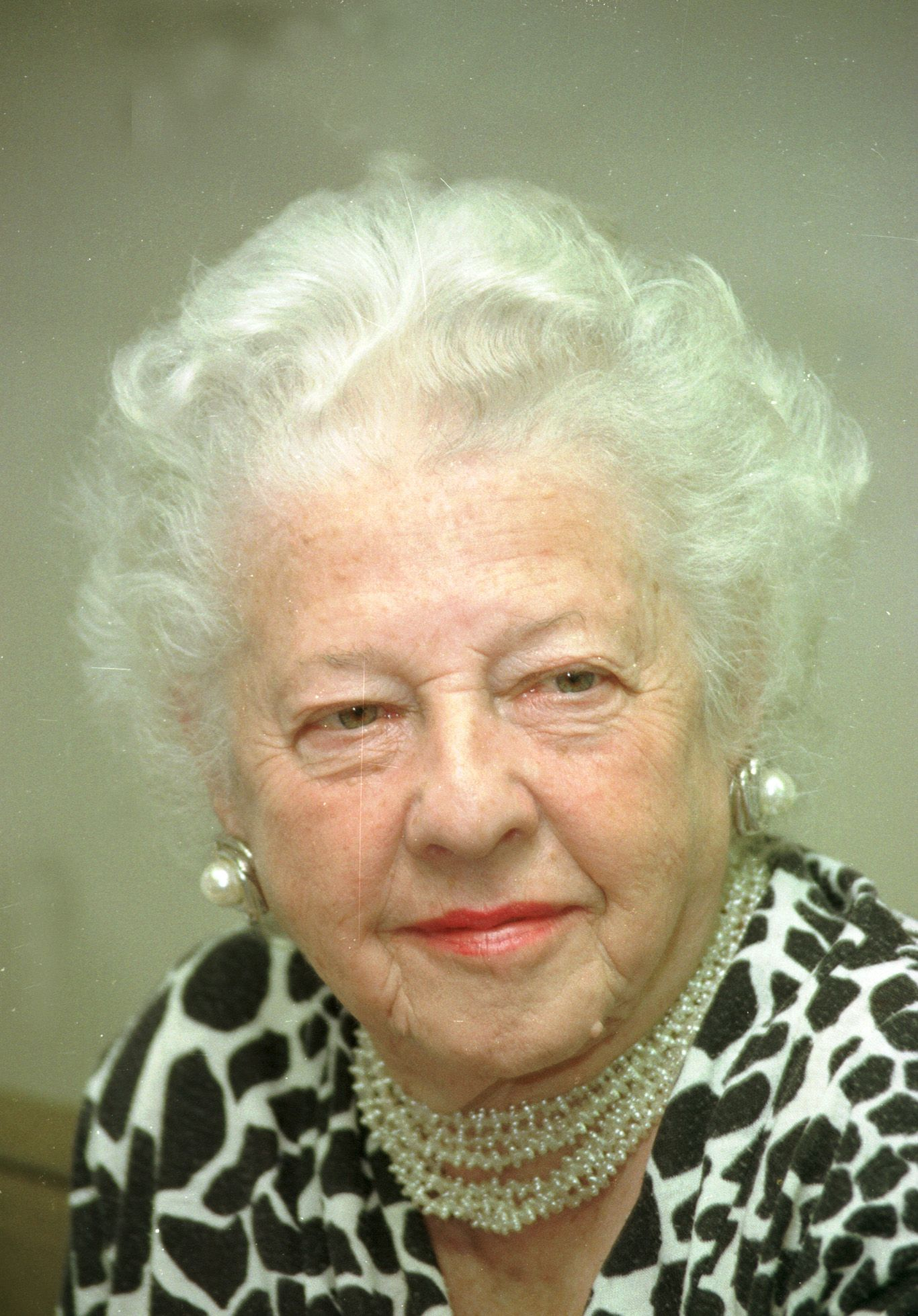

Personal details
- Born: 19 March 1921 Vienna, Austria
- Died: 30 December 2023 (aged 102)

Yehudith Huebner (Hebrew: יהודית היבנר; 19 March 1921 – 30 December 2023) was an Israeli civil servant, diplomat and social activist.

== Biography ==
Huebner was born on 19 March 1921 in Vienna and emigrated to Mandatory Palestine in late 1939.

In 1967 she was appointed the deputy director-general of the Ministry of Interior.

From 1983 to 1987 Huebner was Israel's ambassador to Norway and Iceland. From 1989 to 1998 Huebner was a member of the city council of Jerusalem. Huebner served as chairwoman of Emunah Women's Movement from 1990 to 1996.

Huebner died on 30 December 2023, at the age of 102.
