= American Colony, Jerusalem =

19th-century American colony in Palestine

Coordinates: 31°47′24″N 35°13′52″E

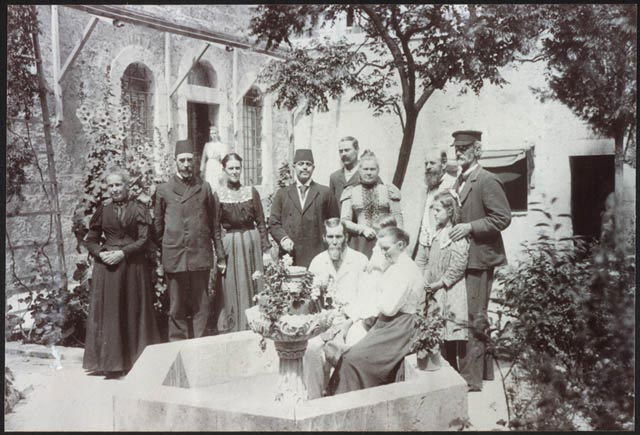
Historical American Colony photo

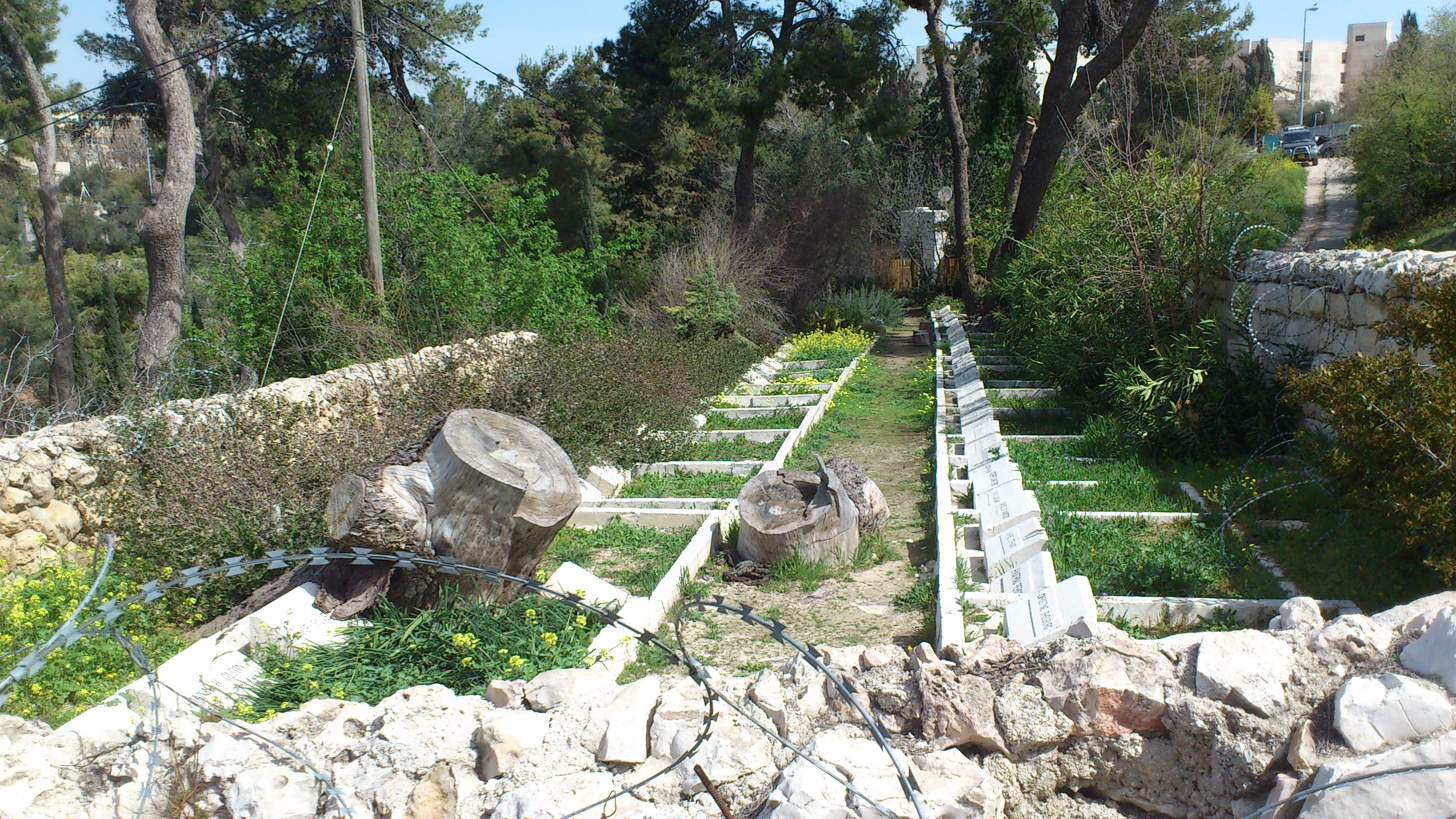
Jerusalem American Colony Cemetery in Mount Scopus

The American religious foundation and philanthropy that informally became known as the American Colony of Jerusalem, was established in the Ottoman Empire in 1881 as a "Christian utopian society" led by American religious leader Horatio Gates Spafford and his Norwegian wife Anne Tobine Larsen Øglende. Largely concerned with providing social services, education, meeting spaces, and medical care, it became known for producing and publishing a series of documentary photographs of the area of Jerusalem, starting in the early 1900s. The community lasted until the 1950s.

The colony is known today mainly for the American Colony Hotel that exists in the place where the colony was located.

== History ==
After suffering a series of tragic losses following the Great Chicago Fire of 1871 (see "It is Well with My Soul"), Chicago residents Anna and Horatio Spafford led a small American contingent in 1881 to Jerusalem to form a Christian utopian society. The "American Colony," as it became known, was later joined by Swedish Christians. The society engaged in philanthropic work amongst the people of Jerusalem regardless of religious affiliation, gaining the trust of the local Muslim, Jewish, and Christian communities. During and immediately after World War I, the American Colony carried out philanthropic work to alleviate the suffering of the local inhabitants, opening soup kitchens, hospitals, orphanages and other charitable ventures.

Although the American Colony ceased to exist as a religious community in the late 1940s, individual members continued to be active in the daily life of Jerusalem. Towards the end of the 1950s, the society's communal residence was converted into the American Colony Hotel. The hotel is an integral part of the Jerusalem landscape where members of all communities in Jerusalem still meet. In 1992 representatives from the Palestine Liberation Organization and Israel met in the hotel where they began talks that led to the historic 1993 Oslo Peace Accord.

== The Spaffords ==
In 1871, Horatio Spafford, a prosperous lawyer and Presbyterian church elder and his wife, Anna, were living with their four young daughters in Chicago. That year, the Great Fire erupted in Chicago, devastating the city. In November 1873, Anna and the children set sail for Europe aboard the SS Ville du Havre with a group of friends. Horatio stayed behind, detained by business. On November 21, the ocean liner collided with a British vessel and sank within minutes. Anna was rescued, but all the children drowned. Horatio received the tragic news in a telegram from Anna that read: "Saved alone. What shall I do?" Horatio immediately left for England to bring his wife home. Crossing the Atlantic, the captain of the ship came to Spafford and said that they were approaching the area where the ship went down that had his wife and daughters on board. There Spafford wrote the lyrics of the hymn "It Is Well with My Soul," the music being added later by Philip Bliss.

Back in Chicago, the Spaffords tried to mend their shattered lives. In 1875, a son, Horatio, was born and, in 1878, a daughter, Bertha. Both contracted scarlet fever in 1880, but only Bertha recovered. Horatio left the Fullerton Presbyterian Church, which he had helped to build, organized a group of friends (dubbed "the Overcomers" by American press), and decided to seek solace in the city of Jerusalem. After the birth of a daughter, Grace, in August 1881, the Spaffords set out for Jerusalem in a group of thirteen adults and three children.

== In Jerusalem ==
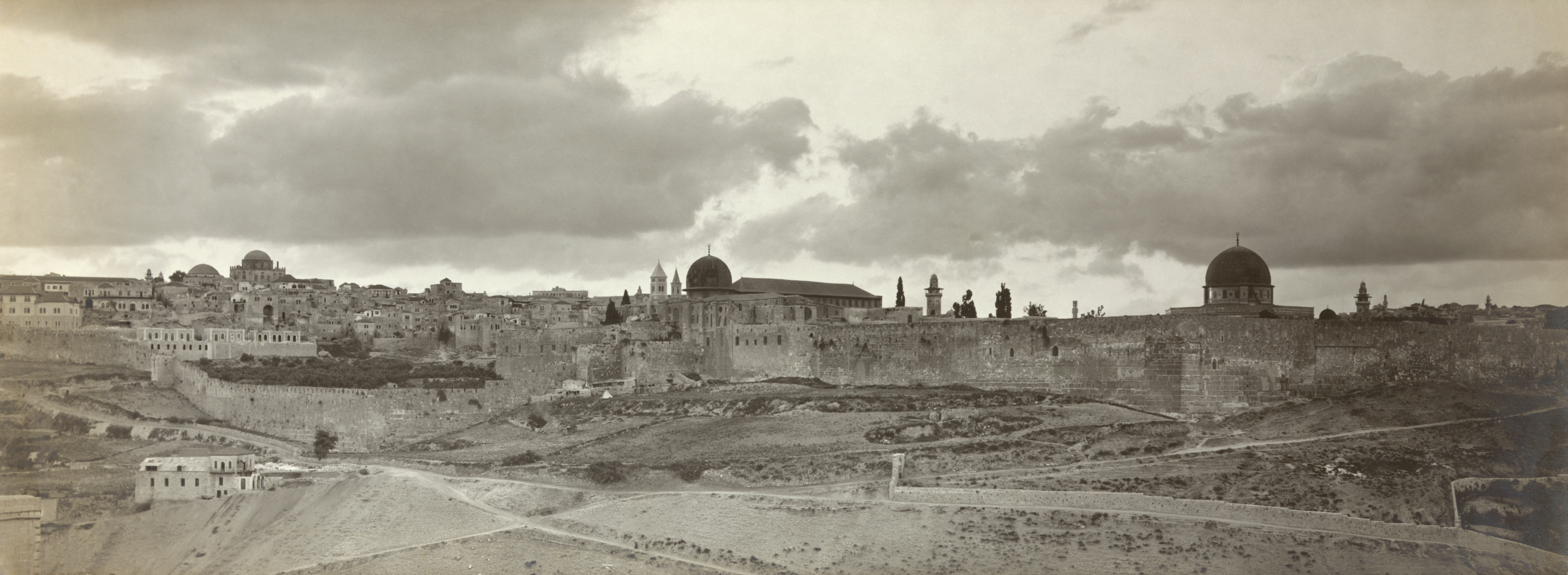
Panorama of Jerusalem, c. 1900–1940 by American Colony Jerusalem.

Moving into rented quarters inside the Damascus Gate in the Old City of Jerusalem, the group adopted a communal lifestyle and engaged in philanthropic activities. Horatio took the Bible as his guide and believed that the society's work would hasten the Second Coming of Jesus. As a commune, the society was suspect in the eyes of many. Members of the colony were shunned by the American consuls (such as Selah Merrill) in Jerusalem for their unusual lifestyle.

Horatio Spafford died of malaria in 1888, but the community continued to grow. Visiting Chicago in 1894, Anna Spafford made contact with the Swedish evangelist Olof Henrik Larsson. Finding they had much in common, the Swedes from Chicago decided to join Anna on her trip back to Jerusalem. Larsson also exhorted his relations and friends in Nås, Sweden, to go immediately to Jerusalem. As a result, 38 adults and seventeen children sold all their possessions and set off for the Holy Land to join the colony, arriving there in July 1896.

The colony, now numbering 150, moved to the large house of a wealthy Arab landowner, Rabbah Husseini, outside the city walls in Sheikh Jarrah on the road to Nablus. Part of the building was used as a hostel for visitors from Europe and America. A small farm developed with cows and pigs, a butchery, a dairy, a bakery, a carpenter's shop, and a smithy. The economy was supplemented by a shop selling photographs, craft items and archaeological artifacts. The American Colonists were embraced by the Jewish and Arab communities for their good works, among them, teaching in both Muslim and Jewish schools. In contrast to the Protestant missionaries in Jerusalem, they never worked for the conversion of those of other faiths.

== Photography department ==
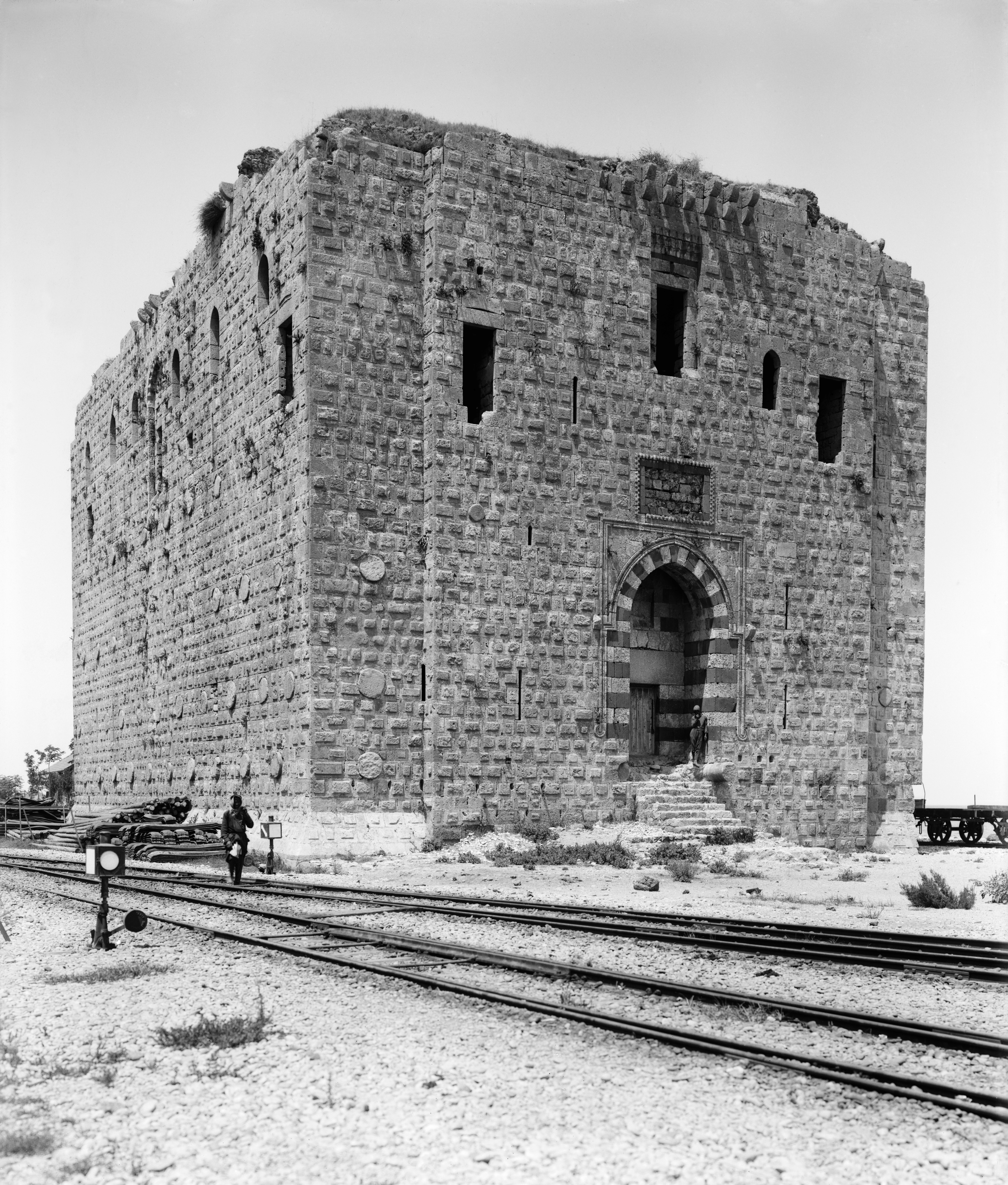
American Colony Photographic Dept. image of the Lion Tower in Tripoli, Lebanon

Around 1900, Elijah Meyers, a member of the American Colony, began taking photographs of places and events in and around the city of Jerusalem. Meyers's work eventually expanded into a full-fledged photographic division within the colony, the so-called American Colony Photo Department, including Hol Lars (Lewis) Larsson and G. Eric Matson, who later renamed the effort as The Matson Photo Service. Their interest in archeological artifacts (such as the Lion Tower in Tripoli pictured here), and the detail of their photographs, led to widespread interest in their work by archeologists. The collection was later donated to the Library of Congress.

== Plague of locusts ==
From March to October 1915, a swarm of locusts stripped areas in and around Palestine of almost all vegetation. This infestation seriously compromised the already depleted food supply of the region and sharpened the misery of all Jerusalemites. Djemal Pasha, Supreme Commander of Syria and Arabia, who mounted a campaign to limit the devastation, asked the American Colony photographers to document the progress of the locust hordes.

== World War I ==
When the Ottoman Empire entered World War I as an ally of Germany in November 1914, Jerusalem and Palestine became a battleground between the Allied and the Central powers. The Allied forces from Egypt, under the leadership of the British, engaged the German, Austrian and Turkish forces in fierce battles for control of Palestine. During this time the American Colony assumed a more crucial role in supporting the local populace through the deprivations and hardships of the war. Because the Turkish military commanders governing Jerusalem trusted the colony, they asked its photographers to record the course of the war in Palestine.

The colony was permitted to continue its relief efforts even after the United States entered the war on the side of the Allies in the spring of 1917. As the German and Turkish armies retreated before the advancing Allied forces, the American Colony took charge of the overcrowded Turkish military hospitals, which were inundated by the wounded.

The outbreak of World War I in 1914 brought great suffering to the country. All young men were conscripted into the army, while the older men were drafted into work brigades. Food supplies dwindled as the Allies sustained a blockade of the Palestinian coast, and the Turkish army confiscated provisions. Weakened by malnutrition, people died of typhus and other epidemics. As famine, disease, and death ravaged the people of Jerusalem, the colony, struggling for their own survival, engaged in relief work. With money from friends in the United States, the American Colony ran a soup kitchen that fed thousands during these desperate times. When the British Allied commander, General Allenby, entered Jerusalem on December 11, 1917, the colony offered their philanthropic services to the new rulers of Palestine and continued to serve their fellow Jerusalemites.

== After the war ==
The colony also administered an orphanage to provide refuge for the many children torn from their parents during World War I. The charitable work begun by the Spaffords continues today in the original colony house abutting the walls of the Old City of Jerusalem. The Spafford Children's Center provides medical treatment and outreach programs for Arab children and their families in Jerusalem.

Inner tensions within the American Colony led to the final demise of this utopian Christian community in the 1950s. Descendants of the Spaffords own a hotel outside the city's walls named the American Colony Hotel.

== In fiction ==
Selma Lagerlöf's novel Jerusalem made the colony famous.

== In photography ==
The book Österlandet is a visual record of Algot Sätterström's (inventor, painter) interaction with members of the American Colony Photographic Division Lewis Larsson, Erik Lind, Furman Baldwin and Eric Matson.

== Jerusalem American Colony Cemetery ==
Located in Tabachnik Garden on the southern slope of Mount Scopus, next to the Hebrew University of Jerusalem. Another cemetery of the colony is located on Mount Zion.

== See also ==
- Pro-Jerusalem Society (1918–1926) - Mr. John Whiting, member of the American Colony, was the Hon. Treasurer of the Society's leading Council, and the Spafford's adopted son Jacob was member of the Council

Jerusalem photographers

19th century

- Armenians in Israel#Photographers: see for Armenian photographers in Jerusalem since 1857
- Antonio Beato (c. 1832–1906)
- Felice Beato (1832–1909)
- Francis Bedford (photographer) (1816–1894)
- Félix Bonfils (1831–1885)
- Mendel Diness (1827–1900), the first Jewish photographer in Jerusalem during the 1850s
- James Graham (1806–1869), Scottish photographer who took some of the earliest images of the Holy Land (1853–1856)
- Khalil Raad (1854–1957), known as "Palestine's first Arab photographer"
- James Robertson (photographer) (1813–1888)
- de:Auguste Salzmann (1824–1872), French archaeologist, painter and pioneer of archaeological photography; photographed in Jerusalem in c. 1854
- Zangaki brothers, C. and G., worked out of Egypt c. 1860s-1890s

1900-1948

From the above various Armenian photographers in Jerusalem, and Khalil Raad.

- Najib Anton Albina (1901–1983), master photographer of the Palestine Archaeological Museum
- Ze'ev (Wilhelm) Aleksandrowicz (1905–1992), photographed in Mandate Palestine in 1932-1935
- Ya'acov Ben-Dov (1882–1968), arrived in Ottoman Palestine in 1907
- Elia Kahvedjian (1910–1999), active in Jerusalem; mentioned here
- Zoltan Kluger (1896–1977), in Mandate Palestine and Israel between 1933–58
- Samuel Joseph Schweig (1905–1985), arrived in Mandate Palestine in 1922
- Herbert Sonnenfeld (1906–1972), German Jewish photographer, photographed in Mandate Palestine in the 1930s
- Rudi Weissenstein (1910–1999), arrived in Mandate Palestine in 1936, author of iconic Israeli Declaration of Independence picture

== Bibliography ==
- Ariel, Yaakov, & Kark, Ruth. (1996). "Messianism, Holiness, Charisma, and Community: The American-Swedish Colony in Jerusalem, 1881-1933," Church History, 65 (4), pages 641-657. This article also discusses Swedish author and Nobel Prize for Literature winner Selma Lagerlöf's positive outlook toward the commune, including the influence it had on her when she wrote her novel Jerusalem.
- Dudman, Helga; Kark, Ruth (1998). The American Colony: scenes from a Jerusalem saga. Carta Jerusalem. ISBN 978-965-220-399-1.
- Fletcher Geniesse, Jane (2009). American Priestess: The Extraordinary Story of Anna Spafford and the American Colony in Jerusalem. Knopf Doubleday Publishing Group. ISBN 978-0-307-27772-5.
- Vester, Bertha Spafford (1950). Our Jerusalem: an American family in the Holy city, 1881-1949. Doubleday. ISBN 0-405-10296-8. Memoir and family history by a daughter of the Colony's founders and its latter-day matriarch.
- Tveit, Odd Karsten (2011). Anna's House: The American Colony in Jerusalem. Rimal Publications. ISBN 978-9963610402. A well-researched, critical treatment of the American Colony phenomenon.
