= John Edward Dinsmore =

Botanist (1862–1951)

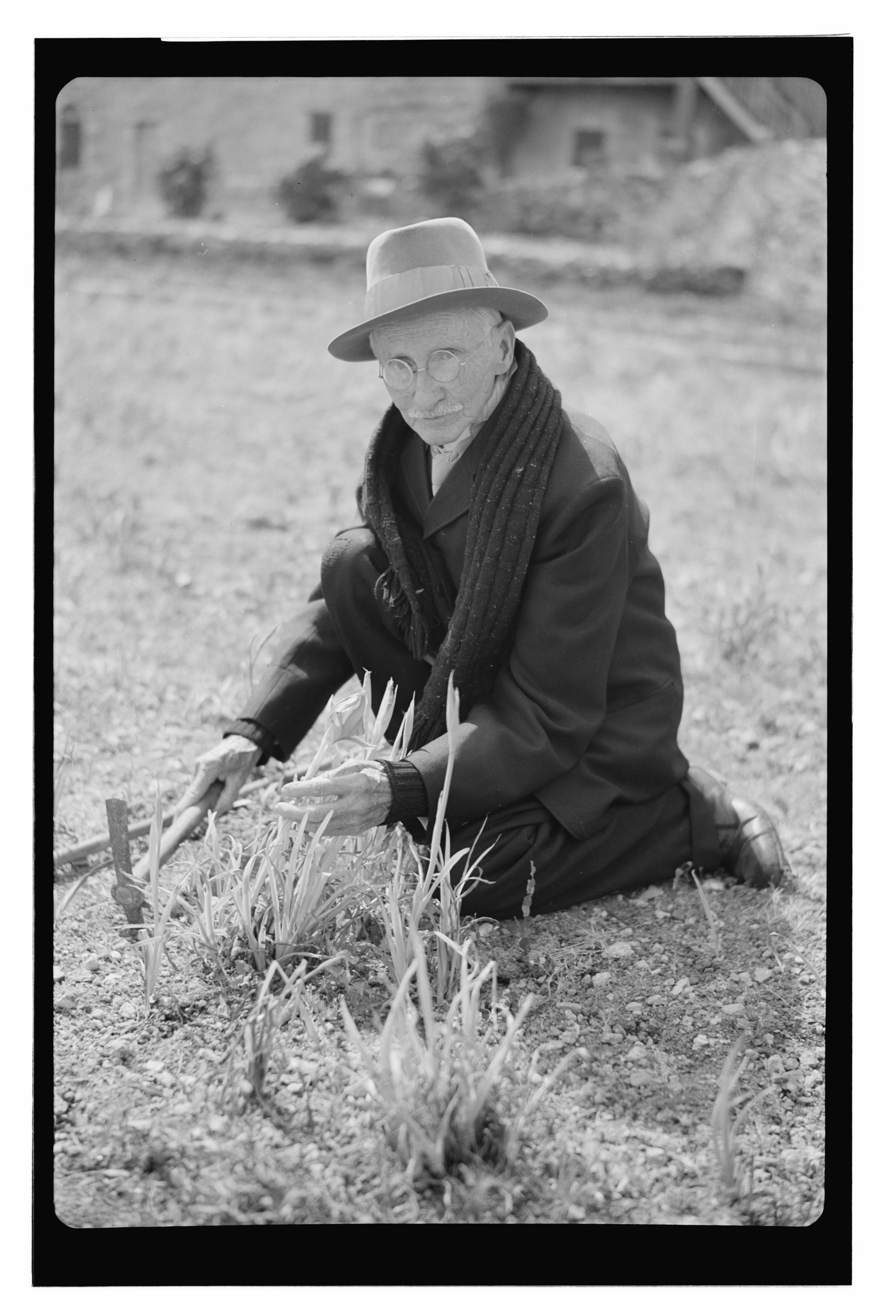
- John Edward Dinsmore
- Born: 1862; Maine, USA
- Died: 1951 (aged 88–89); Jerusalem, Jordanian Part (1948-1967)
- Scientific career
- Fields: Botany

John Edward Dinsmore (1862–1951) was a botanist and educator, born in Maine, United States. He is best known for his role as the director of the herbarium of the American Colony, Jerusalem and as the honorary curator at the herbarium of George Edward Post in Beirut, Lebanon.

== Life and botanical work ==
In 1898, Dinsmore moved with his wife and daughter to Jerusalem, to join the American Colony — a Christian utopian society which had been founded seventeen years earlier in 1881 by Anna and Horatio Spafford. He soon established the Colony's herbarium, and seed and bulb store. He was also director of the Colony's school.

Following the death of fellow botanist George Edward Post in 1909, Dinsmore became honorary curator of Post's Herbarium in Beirut.

Dinsmore spent the rest of his life in Jerusalem, where he died in 1951.

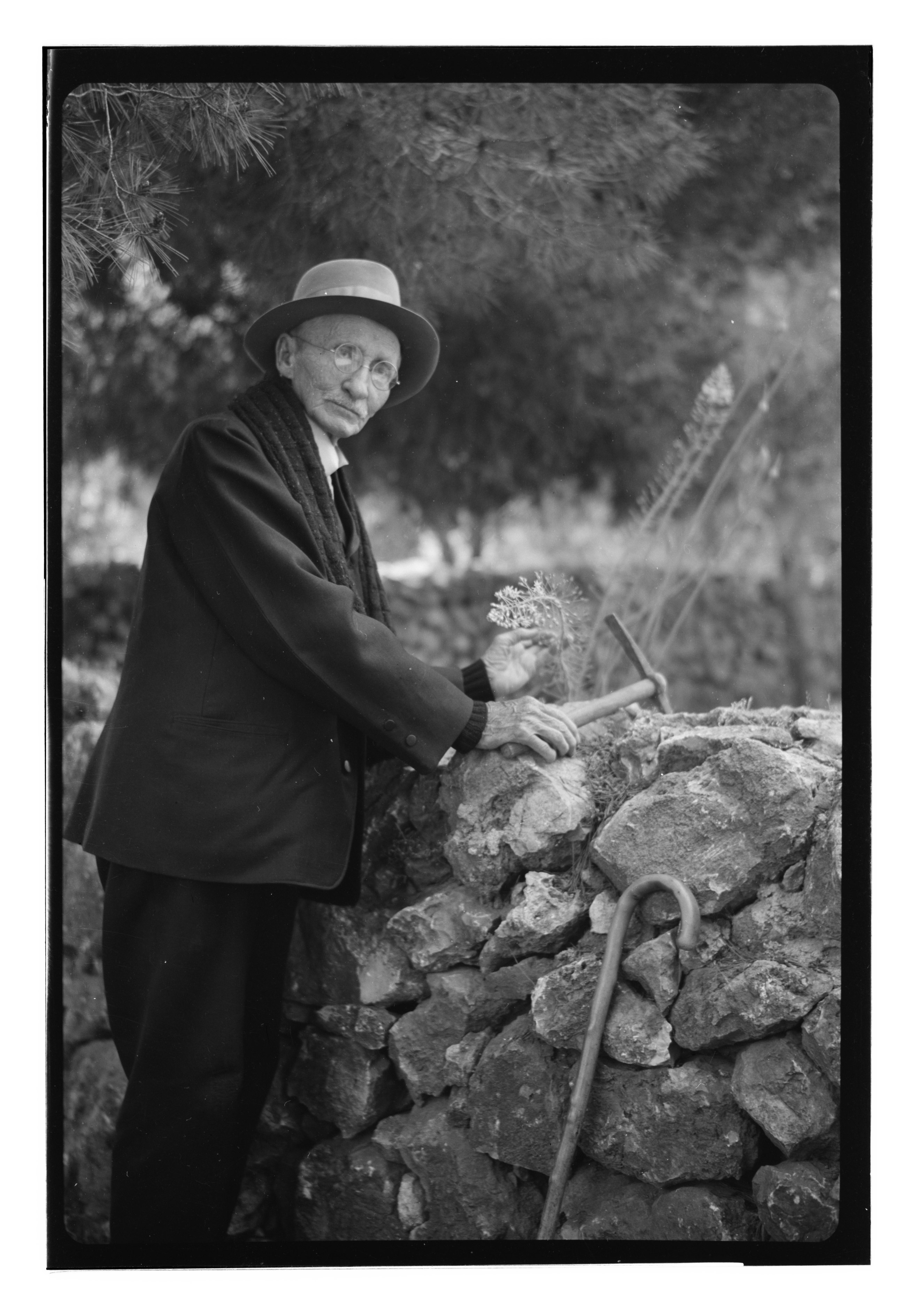
A 1925 image of Dinsmore

Botanical specimens collected by Dinsmore are held at herbaria around the world, most notably the John E. Dinsmore collection at the American Colony Hotel in Jerusalem. Collections are also held at the National Herbarium of Victoria at the Royal Botanic Gardens Victoria, Harvard University Herbaria, the herbarium at the Royal Botanic Gardens, Kew, and the Swedish Museum of Natural History.

== Publications ==
Dinsmore produced several publications, including The Genus Iris in Syria and Palestine (1933) and a substantial revision of Post's Flora of Syria, Palestine and Sinai. Published in 1932-33 and containing both Latin and Arabic names, this volume remains the standard botanical reference for the region.

== Standard author abbreviation ==
The standard author abbreviation Dinsm. is used to indicate this person as the author when citing a botanical name.

Dinsmore named almost forty plant species, including over a dozen species of Iris. See: Category:Taxa named by John Edward Dinsmore and International Plant Name Index
