= Österlandet =

2007 book by Mattias Sättersröm and Mark Smith

- Author: Mattias Sättersröm; Mark Smith
- Language: English
- Genre: Photography
- Publisher: Ingram, Muzot Press
- Publication date: 2007
- Publication place: United States
- Media type: Print, Photographs

Österlandet (ISBN 978-0-9794059-0-7) is a photography book released in 2007. It chronicles 100 years of change in Egypt and Jerusalem by retracing the travels of Algot Sätterström, a Swedish inventor and painter.

Österlandet received positive reviews and was featured in leading periodicals like Svenska Dagbladet, and Vagabond. In January and February 2008 Stockholm's Medelhavsmuseet exhibited photographs from Österlandet. Following the exhibition Österlandet the book was added to Sweden's Royal Library.

== Synopsis ==
In 2003, a box was discovered in Sweden that contained a journal, letters, and old glass-plate negatives which belonged to Algot Sättersröm. They told a story dating back to 1903, when Algot left Sweden to live in Egypt and Jerusalem.

The material was discovered by photographer Mattias Sättersröm, Algot's great-grandson. After reading the journal, letters and printing from the glass-plates Mattias decided to follow in Algot's footsteps. He enlisted the help of friend and photographer, Mark Smith to collaborate on the project and landed in Alexandria one hundred years to the day after Algot arrived.

== Permanence and Change ==
A primary theme of Österlandet is the juxtaposition of 1903–1904 and 2003–2004. Through research and exploration the authors emulate many of Algot Sätterström's photographs and create a visual record of how a century of social and economic change has effected Cairo, Luxor and Jerusalem.

== The American Colony ==
Österlandet recounts Algot's introduction and friendship with the photography division of the American Colony in Jerusalem. During Algot's lifetime the American Colony was a controversial subject in Sweden. The debate continued in 1901 after Nobel Prize winning writer Selma Lagerlöf published Jerusalem, a novel inspired by the American Colony.

While in Jerusalem Mattias Sätterström and Mark Smith met with the last living member of the Anna and Horatio Spafford family who founded the American Colony. With additional research they identified key members of the Colony's photography division to be in Algot's photographs. Amongst others, Algot captured images of Lewis Larsson, Erik Lind, Furman Baldwin and Eric Matson. The latter worked as a collective under the name The American Colony Photographers. Their photographs are registered at the Library of Congress as the Matson Photograph Collection.

== Addenda ==
The addenda presents thumbnail images and descriptions. It also imparts stories about what it took to achieve certain photographs, such as being chased by wild dogs, climbing the Pyramid of Cheops, spending numerous hours in jail to prevent the destruction of over 400 rolls of film, and motorcycle trips far into the Western Desert to assimilate into bedouin culture.

Also in the addenda are letters from Algot to his parents that describe his travels and his commissioned work painting murals for the Mena House Hotel in Giza.
