= Valentine Vester =

British-born hotelier

Valentine Richmond Vester (1912–2008) was a British-born hotelier.

== Biography ==
Valentine Richmond Vester was born in Yorkshire, England. She married Horatio Vester, grandson of Anna Spafford and Horatio Spafford, wealthy Chicago-based emigres who had relocated to Jerusalem in 1881 to engage in charitable activities and establish a children's hospital. In 1896, the Spaffords purchased the unused palace, converted it into a hostel for visiting pilgrims, and named it American Colony Hotel.

Vester and her husband, Jerusalem-born and British lawyer who died in the early 1980s, took over the struggling hostel and converted into a major hotel. The hotel was frequented by foreign correspondents covering Middle Eastern affairs. T. E. Lawrence, known as Lawrence of Arabia, was among its regular guests.

Vester's family include her maternal half aunt Gertrude Bell, a British archaeologist influential in the formation of modern Iraq after World War I. Her uncle, Ernest Richmond, an architect, was involved in Arab political matters under British administration in Palestine.

In her later years, Vester resided in her hotel apartment as her health declined. The hotel remained under family ownership and was managed by a Swiss company.
