= Najib Albina =

Palestinian photographer

Najib Anton Albina
- Born: 2 January 1901; Jerusalem
- Died: 23 July 1983 (aged 82); Fairfax, Virginia, United States
- Occupation: Photographer

Najib Anton Albina (2 January 1901 – 23 July 1983) was the Palestinian Arab master photographer of the Palestine Archaeological Museum and, in that position, took the first original sets of photographs of the Dead Sea Scrolls. Through his positions with the American Colony and Palestine Archaeological Museum, he used photography as a means of recording the history of Christian Palestinian culture as well as the discovery of past cultures in the region. He had a significant impact on the techniques of archeological photographers, especially those who took pictures of the Dead Sea Scrolls, through his contributions to the use of infrared photography.

== Early life ==
Najib was born in Jerusalem to Palestinian Catholic parents Anton Albina and Victoria Safieh. He reportedly claimed distant descent from Italian merchants. He was one of three brothers and one sister. His father, Anton, went missing in action in 1918 during World War I in an unknown front. Najib grew up in Musrara and attended the Ratisbonne School.

Before 1930, he married Adele Morcos (1911 – 1965), a Christian Palestinian from Jericho. She bore them eight children between 1930 and 1950. The family were forced to leave Musrara in the 1948 Nakba and relocated to Bethlehem.

== Early career with the American Colony ==
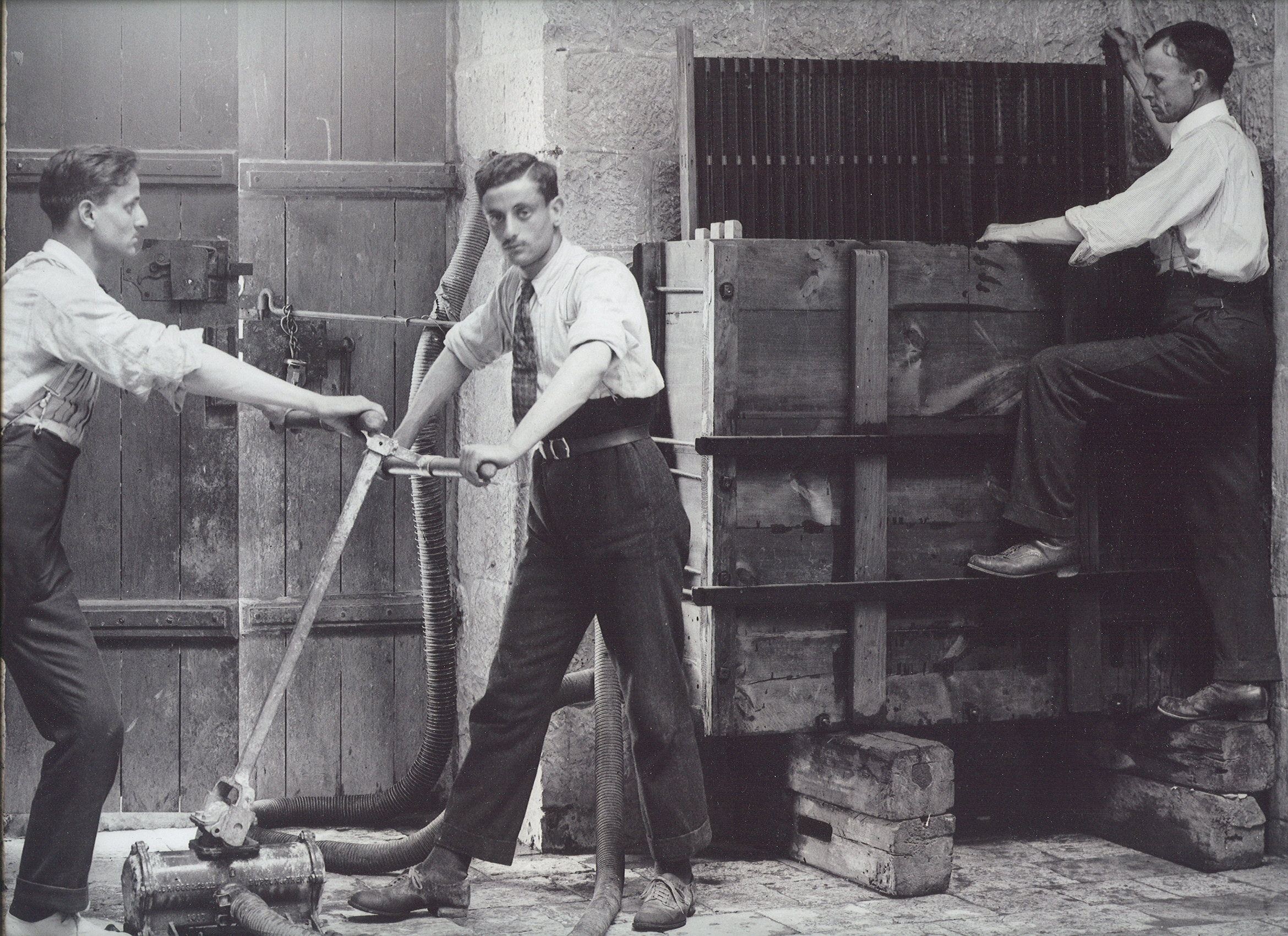
From Left to right: Jamil Albina, Najib Albina, and Lewis Larson developing motion picture film in the American Colony, Jerusalem. Circa 1934. Source: Library of Congress.

Najib worked as a darkroom technician and photographer for the photographic division of the American Colony directly under Lewis Larsson from the early 1920s through the mid-1930s. He worked primarily taking and developing film of archaeological sites in the greater Jerusalem area; however, he also worked developing motion pictures. He worked alongside his brother, Jamil Albina, in the photographic division. Many of the photographs taken by Najib, Jamil, and Lewis Larsson are publicly available through the Library of Congress.

== Career at the Palestine Archaeological Museum ==
From 20 January 1952 until 1967, Najib Albina served as the master photographer of the Palestine Archaeological Museum (PAM). During this time, Najib photographed most of the museum's collection of fragments and manuscripts using broadband, fluorescence infrared photography (a process known as reflected NIR photography). Najib assembled over 1750 photographic plates for the museum of the scrolls using large format film. In addition, the photographs were taken on animal skin, and allowed the text to stand out, making the plates especially useful for assembling fragments. Being the earliest photographs of the museum's collection, the most complete in the world at the time, they recorded the fragment and scrolls before their further decay in storage and are often considered the best recorded copies of the scrolls. Some of this decay was as a direct consequence of the museum storage, in damp cellars, and the environmental conditions with which the museum allowed the fragments and scrolls to be exposed, such as smoking, including by Najib. Some of the PAM's negatives taken by Najib have been destroyed due to poor storage and care.

Infrared photographic plates of the Dead Seas Scrolls assembled by Najib Albina in the 1950s; source: PAM/IAA

Najib took five sets, not all complete, of the Dead Sea Scrolls. The sets spanned the sorting process of the scrolls from unsorted to complete vertical format as assembled by editors at the PAM, with most of the scrolls and fragments being photographed at least three times. During the process, Najib recorded his progress and work with the scrolls in a log book, still held today by the Israel Antiquities Authority.

In addition to photographing the fragments and scrolls of the Dead Sea Scrolls collection for the PAM, Najib took other photographs for the museum. This included, but was not limited to, site photographs. Many of the site photographs for the Dead Sea Scrolls were referenced by notations of the film plates that Najib put together for the museum. The Dead Sea Scroll site photographs taken by Najib were made on 13 × 18 cm format film. Other projects were assigned to him on an ad hoc basis by Yusuf Saad, the museum's curator at the time. Such projects included taking photographs of Wilson's Arch and Beth-zur.

The museum fell from Jordanian to Israeli control in 1967 as a result of the Six-Day War, and there was significant fighting at the museum site. Unlike during the Suez Crisis, the Dead Sea Scrolls collection was not moved to a more secure location, like the Ottoman Bank. This may have been because of the damages the collection sustained during that period. Palestinian Arabs attacked the museum and attempted to loot some of the contents, putting Najib at gunpoint to unlock the glass plates behind which the Dead Sea Scrolls were stored. He lied, said he did not have the keys, and noted that he himself was Arab. After being held for three days, he was released. Soon after, the Arabs lost control of the museum to Israeli forces, who used parts of the museum as a lookout tower. After the event Najib left employment of the museum in 1967. Najib was made an offer to return full-time as the master photographer under the new Israeli management of the renamed PAM, now known as the Rockefeller Museum, as the early grants and availability of funds allowed the museum to do so. He declined both in protest to the change in national management of the museum and because there were significant restrictions on his family's living conditions in Jerusalem.

== Later life ==
Najib had seven children – five girls and two boys: Lillan, Lima, Lorraine, Lucy, Vicky, Issa, and Joseph. After Najib's exile to the United States, just before the beginning of the Six-Day War, he settled in Los Angeles, California. During this time, individuals pressured him and his family to turn over photographs of the Dead Sea Scrolls. However, as part of the agreement with the Palestine Archaeological Museum, he had already turned over the photographs, negatives, and photographic equipment, as they were museum property.

After retiring and moving to Virginia, Najib Albina died there on 23 July 1983.

== See also ==
Photographers active in Mandate Palestine 1918–1948

- American Colony, Jerusalem#Photography: see for its Photographic Department, later Matson Photographic Service, active c. 1900-1940s
- Armenians in Israel § Photographers: see for Armenian photographers in Jerusalem since 1857
- Ze'ev (Wilhelm) Aleksandrowicz (1905–1992), Polish-born photographer, active in Mandate Palestine between 1932 and 1935
- Ya'acov Ben-Dov (1882–1968), Israeli photographer and pioneer of Jewish cinematography in Palestine
- Zoltan Kluger (1896–1977), important photographer in pre-state Israel
- Khalil Raad (1854–1957), known as "Palestine's first Arab photographer"
- Samuel Joseph Schweig (1905–1985), landscape and archaeology photographer in Mandate Palestine and early Israel
- Herbert Sonnenfeld (1906–1972), German Jewish photographer, husband of Leni, photographed in Mandate Palestine in the 1930s
- Leni Sonnenfeld (1907–2004), German Jewish photographer, wife of Herbert, photographed Israel in the early years of its existence
