= The Matson Photo Service =

Defunct American Christian organization in Jerusalem

The Matson Photo Service, whose founders were G. Eric Matson and his wife Edith, evolved from the American Colony Photo Department that helped fund the philanthropic work of The American Colony in Jerusalem; a Christian utopian society, established in 1881 by Horatio Spafford and his Norwegian born wife Anna, whose members shared a belief in the iminent Second Coming of Christ.

== History ==
After a series of tragedies in which Horatio Spafford's law firm suffered severe physical and financial damage in the Great Fire of Chicago of 1871, and the Spaffords lost their 4 daughters at sea when the liner, on which Anna was travelling to Europe, collided with another vessel, they moved to Jerusalem with a group of Americans who shared their religious beliefs. There, they established a religious colony, whose purpose of its members was not to convert non-Christians, but to live and worship together whilst undertaking charitable work in the Palestinian community for all faiths. Towards the end of the century there was an influx of Americans and Swedes into the community and to finance their work they tapped into the burgeoning tourist industry in Jerusalem, not only opening a hostel and souvenir shop for travellers but also a photography department.

Gastgifvar Eric Matson (June 16, 1888 – December 1977) was born in the Nås parish of Dalarna, Sweden. In 1896, the Matson family together with a group of their Nås countrymen moved to Jerusalem and joined the American Colony. In 1898, Elijah Meyers, who had emigrated from India to Jerusalem in the 1890s and was a Jewish convert to Christianity, used his photographic knowledge gained in Bombay and London to found the American Colony Photo Department. Meyers trained the next generation of photographers, Lewis Larsson, who headed the photo operation between 1903 and 1933, Eric and Lars Lind, Furman Baldwin and G. Eric Matson, amongst others. These photographers together with photographic assistants, lab technicians and hand-tinting artists were responsible for taking, developing, printing and hand tinting prints, and producing thematic photograph albums, stereographs, panoramic photos, postcards, and glass lantern slides. These were sold in the Colony's store near Jaffa Gate and also to newspapers, periodicals (between 1913 and 1940 a series of National Geographic articles on the Middle East were published that featured American Colony images by Matson and Larsson), and were included in travel books.

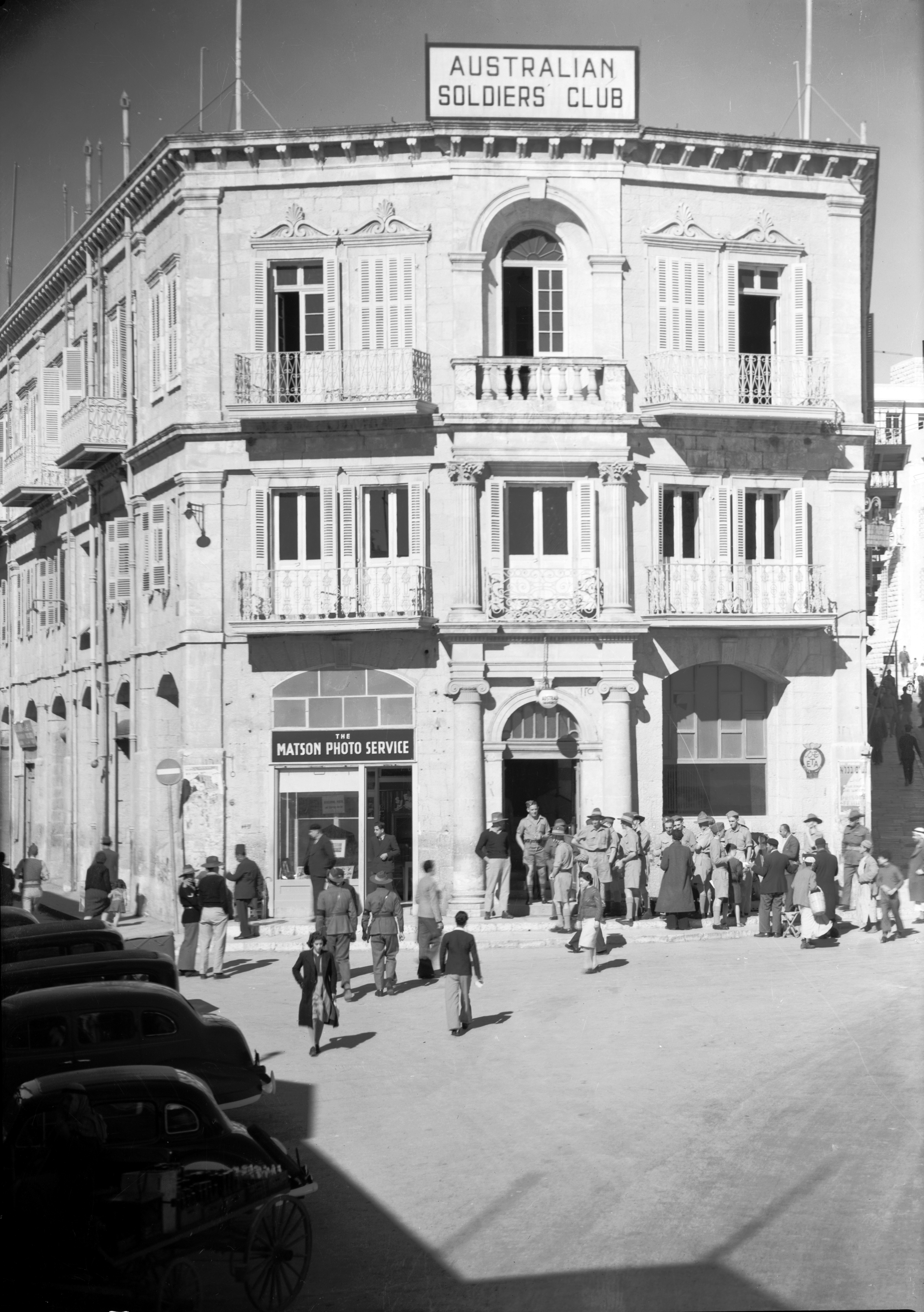
Entrance to The Matson Photo Service, Australian Soldiers Club (old Fast Hotel), Jerusalem dated October 10, 1940

G. Eric Matson started work in the darkroom of the American Colony Photo Department as an apprentice and there he met the Kansas born American Edith Yantiss (1889–1966), whose family was also part of the community. They married in 1924 and had three children, Anne, David and Margaret. From 1934, when the Swedish and American sides of the Colony split, until 1940 when the department was renamed The Matson Photo Service, the Matsons managed the photography business with G. Eric Matson taking the photographs and his wife running the production side. The Matsons, along with other employees, continued the business, that had relocated to the lower end of Jaffa Street, until the unrest in Palestine led them to move to the United States. They settled in Southern California and had the bulk of the photo service's negatives, which included the archive of the American Colony Photo Department, shipped to them. The Jerusalem side of the business carried on for a while but, after the store and offices suffered severe damage during the Nakba of 1948–9 and the consequential decline of the tourist industry, it closed in the early 1950s. The Matsons continued to sell photographs from California.

== Legacy ==
Edith Yantiss Matson died in 1966 and that year, her husband, realising the significance of the archive, donated some 13,000 negatives and eleven albums of contact prints to the Library of Congress Prints and Photographs Division. In 1970, the Library shipped another group of negatives, which had been stored in the YMCA basement in Jerusalem and suffered water damage, to Washington D.C. In 1971, Matson assisted staff at the Library of Congress in the organisation and identification of the photographs.

The collection, now called "The G. Eric and Edith Matson Photograph Collection", consists of some 23,000 negatives and prints from the archives of the American Colony Photo Department as well as the Matson Photo Service that were donated between 1966 and 1981 by Matson and/or his beneficiary, the Home for the Aged of the Protestant Episcopal Church of the Diocese of Los Angeles (now called the Kensington Episcopal Home).

Photographs attributed to The Matson Photo Service, Jerusalem are also held in the Conway Library at The Courtauld Institute of Art, London, whose archive, of primarily architectural images, is in the process of being digitised under the wider Courtauld Connects project.
