= Ya'acov Ben-Dov =

Israeli photographer

Yaacov Ben Dov יעקב בן-דוב
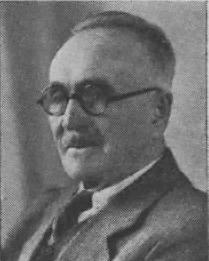
- Born: June 21, 1882; Ukraine
- Died: 1968
- Education: Kiev Art Academy, Bezalel Academy of Arts and Design
- Known for: Photographer, filmmaker
- Movement: Israeli art, cinematographer
- Awards: Worthy citizen of Jerusalem award in 1967

Yaacov Ben-Dov (Hebrew: יעקב בן-דוב; 21 June 1882 – 7 March 1968) was an Israeli photographer and a pioneer of Jewish cinematography in Palestine.

== Biography ==
Ya'acov Ben-Dov was born in a shtetl near Kiev in Ukraine, son of Dov and Raizel Lasutra. He studied religious studies in a heder and secular subjects with private tutors. In his mid teens, he joined a movement devoted to reviving the Hebrew language. He attended the Academy of the Arts in Kiev and became a professional photographer. A skeptical Menachem Ussishkin is said to have asked Ben Dov what need he thinks Jerusalem has for a photographer, to which Ben Dov answered "I need Jerusalem more than Jerusalem needs a photographer."

Ben Dov arrived in Eretz Yisrael in 1907 as part of the Second Aliyah and attended the Bezalel Academy of Arts and Design where he continued his studies and later taught photography. In 1909, he married Roza Rabinowitz, a pharmacist, who immigrated from Zhytomir, Ukraine. In 1922, he was one of the founders of the Jerusalem neighborhood of Talpiot.

Ben-Dov first encountered film in 1911 when British Zionist Murray Rosenberg filmed his visit and visited Bezalel Academy. He was enchanted but it took him several years to obtain a camera and raw film stock. At the outbreak of World War I, he joined the Ottoman Imperial Army and obtained a commission as a medical photographer in the Austrian army in Jerusalem. In 1917, he finally acquired the equipment he needed probably through his Austrian military connections.

== Filmography ==
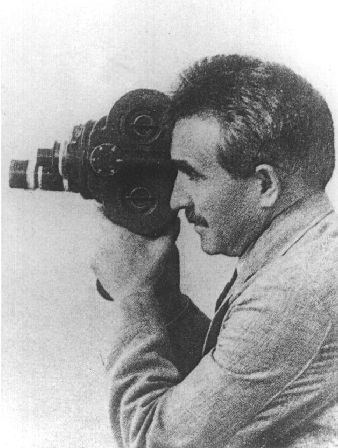
Ya'acov Ben-Dov as a filmmaker

Ben-Dov established the Menorah Film Company and became the sole cameraman filming key historical events. His first film, Judea Liberated documents General Edmund Allenby's historic entry into Jerusalem on 11 December 1917. Just a month earlier, the Balfour Declaration, expressing British support for a Jewish state in Palestine, was issued. And thus, Allenby's entry was enthusiastically received. In addition, Ben-Dov photographed Hanukkah festivities in Jerusalem schools, craftsmen working in workshops, public gatherings, etc. under the title Mirror of the Return to Zion. After the production of this film, he received some financial support from the official Zionist bodies who now recognized the value of his work.

Ben-Dov immortalized images of the Jewish Legion in Eretz Israel in his second film Land of Israel Liberated (1919), which includes a portrait of Legion founder Ze'ev Jabotinsky in uniform. In February 1915, a small committee in Alexandria approved Ze'ev Jabotinsky and Joseph Trumpeldor’s plan to form a Jewish military unit that would participate in the British effort to conquer the Land of Israel from the Ottoman Empire. Instead a Zion Mule Corps unit of 560 soldiers was formed fighting in the Gallipoli Campaign in Turkey. After the dissolution of the Mule Corps, a number of veterans, Jewish soldiers from abroad and fresh recruits from Eretz Israel eventually formed an official Jewish regiment called the Jewish Legion in August 1917 seeing action north of Jerusalem, in the Jordan River and in the Battle of Megiddo (1918). In addition to the fragments of the Jewish Legion, the Steven Spielberg Jewish Film Archive holds one reel showing Jewish communities in north of the country including Merhavia, Sejera, Degania, Rosh Pinna, Safed, Migdal and Metula.

Ben-Dov shot some of the earliest footage of an archaeological expedition, the excavation of the Hammat Tiberias Synagogue, in 1920. The footage was used in his film Shivat Zion (Return to Zion). The film was screened at the 12th Zionist Congress in Carlsblad.

In 1923, he produced Palestine Awakening, the first film to be shot exclusively for the Jewish National Fund. It is also the first Hebrew film using actors and containing dialogue.

Yaacov Ben-Dov photographed key events in the life of the yishuv, such as the wedding of Rachel Ussishkin to Shimon Fritz Bodenheimer, the arrival of the first British Commissioner to Palestine Herbert Samuel, the funeral of Eliezer Ben-Yehuda and the opening of the Hebrew University of Jerusalem.

Baruch Agadati purchased Ben Dov's film archives in 1934, when Ben Dov retired from filmmaking owing to his inability to adapt to sound. Agadati and his brother Yitzhak used it to start the AGA Newsreel.

== Films ==
Title	Director
1918
Yehuda Hameshukhreret (Judea Liberated)	Yaacov Ben Dov
1919
Eretz Yisrael Hameshukhreret (Land of Israel Liberated)	Yaacov Ben Dov
1920
Shivat Zion (The Return to Zion)	Ya'ackov Ben-Dov
1923
Eretz Yisrael Hamithadeshet (Land of Israel Rejuvenating)	Yaacov Ben Dov
1924
Banim Bonim (Land of Promise)	Yaacov Ben Dov
1927
Ha-Tehiya (The Revival)	Yaacov Ben Dov
1928
Aviv B'Eretz Yisrael (Springtime in Palestine)	Yaacov Ben Dov
1929
Nakum Uvanimu (We Shall Rise and We Shall Build)	Yaacov Ben Dov
1932
Yoman Eretz Yisrael	Yaacov Ben-Dov

== Awards and recognition ==
- Worthy Citizen of Jerusalem

== See also ==
- Cinema of Israel

Photographers active in Ottoman and Mandate Palestine 1900-1948

- Najib Anton Albina (1901–1983), master photographer of the Palestine Archaeological Museum
- American Colony, Jerusalem#Photography: see for its Photographic Department, later Matson Photographic Service, active c. 1900-1940s
- Armenians in Israel#Photographers: see for Armenian photographers in Jerusalem since 1857
- Ze'ev (Wilhelm) Aleksandrowicz (1905-1992), Polish-born photographer, active in Mandate Palestine between 1932 and 1935
- Zoltan Kluger (1896-1977), important photographer in Palestine
- Khalil Raad (1854–1957), known as "Palestine's first Arab photographer"
- Samuel Joseph Schweig (1905–1985), landscape and archaeology photographer in Mandate Palestine and early Israel
- de:Herbert Sonnenfeld (1906-1972), German Jewish photographer, husband of Leni, photographed in Mandate Palestine in the 1930s
- Leni Sonnenfeld (1907-2004), German Jewish photographer, wife of Herbert, photographed Israel in the early years of its existence
- Rudi Weissenstein (1910-1999), Israeli photographer, author of iconic Declaration of Independence picture
