= List of Israeli films before 1960 =

Films produced in Israel and the British Mandate for Palestine before 1960:

== Overview ==
=== Prior to the establishment of the state ===
Film Industry in Palestine during the British Mandate of Palestine and afterwards during the first years of the state, did not actually exist. Movies were filmed in Palestine since the time of the beginning of the silent film era during the 19th century, but an actual movie industry was not really conceived, both in the period of the Yishuv, and also during the first years of the state. The films which were produced were rare, and usually did not match the quality of the films which were imported from abroad. Initially the industry, focused particularly on producing propaganda films and news broadcasts which were shown in the Israeli cinemas during that time before the movies were shown.

=== The 1950s ===
During the 1950s, some development was made. Israeli cinema studios were established such as Geva Films" (סרטי גבע) and the "Israel Film Studios" (אולפני ההסרטה בישראל) in Herzliya, and several films which contained plot were created. In 1954, the law to encourage the production of Israeli film (החוק לעידוד הסרט הישראלי) was passed, and in 1955, the most important Israeli film which was filmed until then was produced - Hill 24 Doesn't Answer (גבעה 24 אינה עונה). In the late 1950s, the Israeli film industry was still in its early stages and hadn't managed to create for itself unique characteristics, its own language, or even a real industry. The films were mostly patriotic in nature. The films were not simply "action" or "crime" films, they could belong to these genres but tended to include a very Israeli perspective and touch due to very recent events in the nation's tenuous formation.

== Israeli films prior to 1960 ==
=== Pre-State of Israel ===
Title	Director	Cast	Genre	Notes
1918
Yehuda Hameshukhreret	Ya'ackov Ben-Dov			
1919
Eretz Yisrael Hameshukhreret	Ya'ackov Ben-Dov			
1920
Shivat Zion	Ya'ackov Ben-Dov			
1923
Eretz Yisrael Hamithadeshet	Ya'ackov Ben-Dov			
1924
Banim Bonim	Ya'ackov Ben-Dov			
1927
Ha-Tehiya	Ya'ackov Ben-Dov			
1928
Aviv B'Eretz Yisrael	Ya'ackov Ben-Dov			
1932
Oded Hanoded	Haim Halachmi			See external link
Va'Yehi Be'May	Haim Halachmi			See external link
Yoman Eretz Yisrael	Ya'ackov Ben-Dov			
1933
Aviva				
1935
Avodah				
Hebrew Melody	Helmar Lerski			
Zot Hi Ha'aretz				
1947
Adamah	Helmar Lerski			
Lo Tafhidunu				
Battle for Survival				
