= American Colony Hotel =

Pradeep Ravindra Kumara

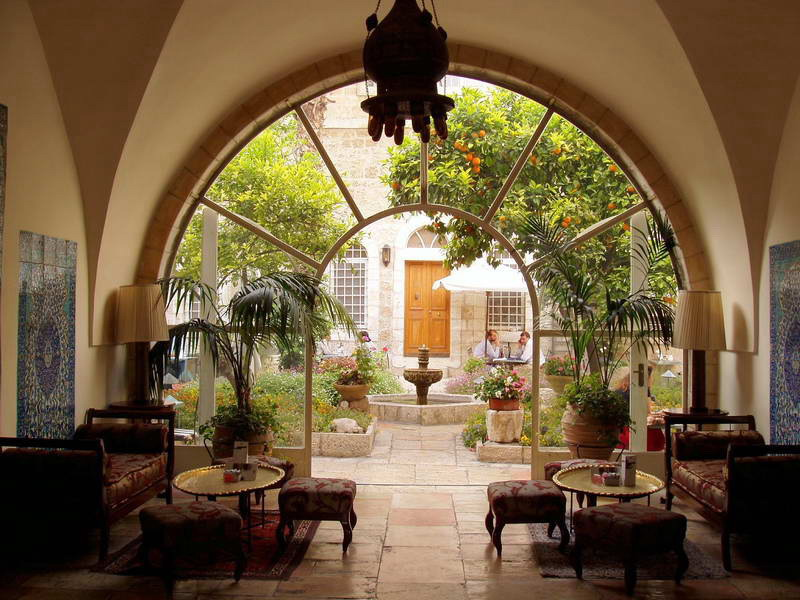

- Location within Jerusalem

General information
- Location: American Colony, One Louis Vincent Street, Jerusalem
- Coordinates: 31°47′22.88″N 35°13′45.76″E
- Opening: 1902

Design and construction
- Developer: Plato von Ustinov

Website
- www.americancolony.com

The American Colony Hotel is a luxury hotel located in a historic building in Jerusalem which previously housed the utopian American–Swedish community known as the American Colony.

== History ==
The building was originally built and owned by an Ottoman Pasha Rabbah Daoud Amin Effendi al-Husseini, who lived there with his harem of four wives. Soon after his fourth marriage, al-Husseini died. In 1895, the building was sold to a Christian group who arrived in Jerusalem in 1881 to set up a commune. Their leader was Horatio Spafford, a lawyer from Chicago and his wife, Anna.

In 1896, the Americans were joined by two groups of Swedish settlers. This Christian utopian society became known as the American Colony.

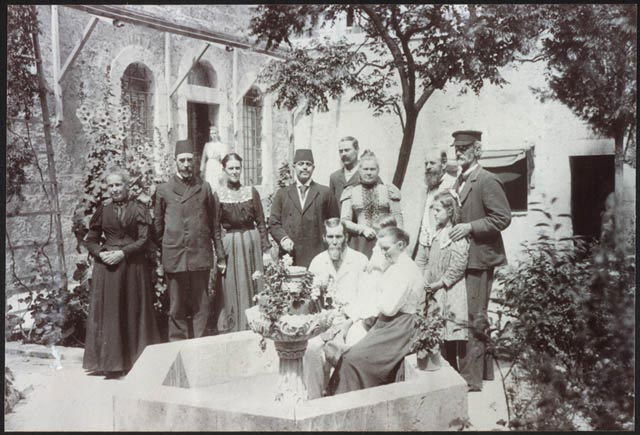
Historic photo in the hotel gardens

In 1902, the Jaffa hotelier Plato von Ustinov (grandfather of the British actor Peter Ustinov) was looking for a place to put up guests visiting Jerusalem and asked the Spaffords to accommodate them. Soon after, the building was turned into a hotel.

== Today ==
Today the American Colony Hotel calls itself an oasis of neutrality in the Palestinian–Israeli conflict. It is still owned by descendants of the Spaffords. A grandson, Horatio Vester, was the manager until he retired in 1980. His wife, Valentine, lived in the hotel until her death in June 2008. Since 1980, the hotel has been run by a Swiss company. The Effendis' original bedroom is called "Room One."

== Famous guests ==
The American Colony Hotel, on the "seamline" between east and west Jerusalem, is the preferred hotel of many diplomats, politicians and foreign correspondents. Its famous guests include Jack Greenberg, Leon Uris, T.E. Lawrence, Christiane Amanpour, Winston Churchill, Bob Dylan, Tony Blair, Philip Roth, Eric Frattini, and John le Carré. Le Carré wrote one of his books at the hotel, and Frattini included information about the hotel in his second novel, El Laberinto de Agua (The Labyrinth of Water). In 1987, Michael Winner filmed much of the 1930s-set Agatha Christie mystery Appointment With Death at the hotel. In 1995, Peter Ustinov visited the hotel and planted a palm tree in the courtyard.
