= Horatio Gates Spafford Sr. =

Horatio Gates Spafford (1778–1832) was a writer and inventor, who was well known for compiling two gazetteers of New York State. He was born in Dorset, Vermont, but spent most of his adult life in New York State, near Albany. Spafford was the father of the lawyer and poet also named Horatio Gates Spafford.

== Family ==
Spafford's father was Captain John Spafford, who served with Revolutionary-War general and hero Horatio Gates, in Gate's victory at the Battle of Saratoga. Despite his illustrious namesake, Horatio Gates Spafford did not stick with military training.

Captain Spafford and his wife, Mary Baldwin Spafford, raised their large family (eventually 10 children) in Vermont.

== Advocate for public education and science ==
Through publications and wide correspondence, Gates aimed to advance education for the American democratic citizenry. Among many notables with whom he corresponded were Noah Webster, Thomas Jefferson, and James Madison.

Spafford's first book was General Geography and Rudiments of Useful Knowledge… on a New Plan, and Designed for the Use of Schools (1809). Besides geography and other topics, it covered astronomy, government, education, and world religions. Jedediah Morse had a lock on the school Geography-text market, however; so, Spafford did not have success there.

In 1815, Spafford began compiling, editing, and distributing a magazine: American Magazine, A Monthly Miscellany of Many Kinds. He had an impressive list of subscribers, like Madison and Webster, but not enough to keep the journal going for more than a year.

One of Spafford's articles in that magazine, written under a pseudonym, strongly encouraged practical over classical education. His idea may have influenced the founding, in Troy, New York, near where Spafford was living, of the future Rensselaer Polytechnic Institute. Spafford also wrote articles describing various of his own inventions, like a new carriage-wheel axle design.

Spafford did not have much luck making money, whether by writing, inventions, or periods of land speculating. However, if only he had pursued it further, Spafford might possibly have invented a winner as an idea he presented in a scientific paper on “the art of making Iron and Steel from native Ores of the United States” was virtually the same as what Bessemer patented years later as the “Bessemer Process” for removing impurities from iron to make steel.

== Spafford’s Gazetteers ==
Gazetteers are, essentially, geographic dictionaries. They list places, with descriptions, in a certain region, and usually include maps.

After he completed his geography book, Spafford began work on his first gazetteer of New York State. He had letters of support, so Spafford believed that he could afford the project. For example, Governor Daniel D. Thompkins assured Spafford of “reasonable access” to state papers and documents; and Chancellor Robert R. Livingston offered him discounts if he rode on steamboats for his research trips.

Spafford also obtained a loan of $3000 from New York State, repayable with interest after three years, based on legislation passed in 1811. He published his book with time to spare in 1813. However, when a middleman involved with the state loan went bankrupt, Spafford was held liable and left in debt. Over years spent sending agents to remote counties for data and paying postage to write to over 1000 local contacts, Spafford had spent over $7000.

Spafford's completed book had these three sections:

1. "Comprehensive Geographical and Statistical View of the Whole State." (Alphabetical by topic.);
2. Alphabetical list of counties, "With Topographical and Statistical Tables, Showing the Civil and Political Divisions, Population, Post-Offices &C."; and
3. "A Very Full and Minute Topographical Description of Each Town ... &C. in the Whole State, Alphabetically Arranged... Forming a Complete Gazetteer or Geographical Dictionary of the State of New-York."

In 1824, Spafford published an expanded and reorganized gazetteer (he insisted it was not just a second edition). It included an expanded, new map, and had a more typical structure, of two main sections: the geographic dictionary plus more general, statewide information and statistics on e.g., agriculture, geography, and government.

== Final years ==
In poor health, Spafford mostly gave up publishing by 1825, and kept himself busy with mechanics experiments, and corresponding with his circle of friends and acquaintances. Spafford did release two guidebooks, A Pocket Guide for the Traveller”, and New York Pocket Book, and a new edition of his Geography text. He died of cholera in 1832.
