= Shmuel Joseph Schweig =

Israeli photographer

Samuel Joseph Schweig שמואל יוסף שוויג
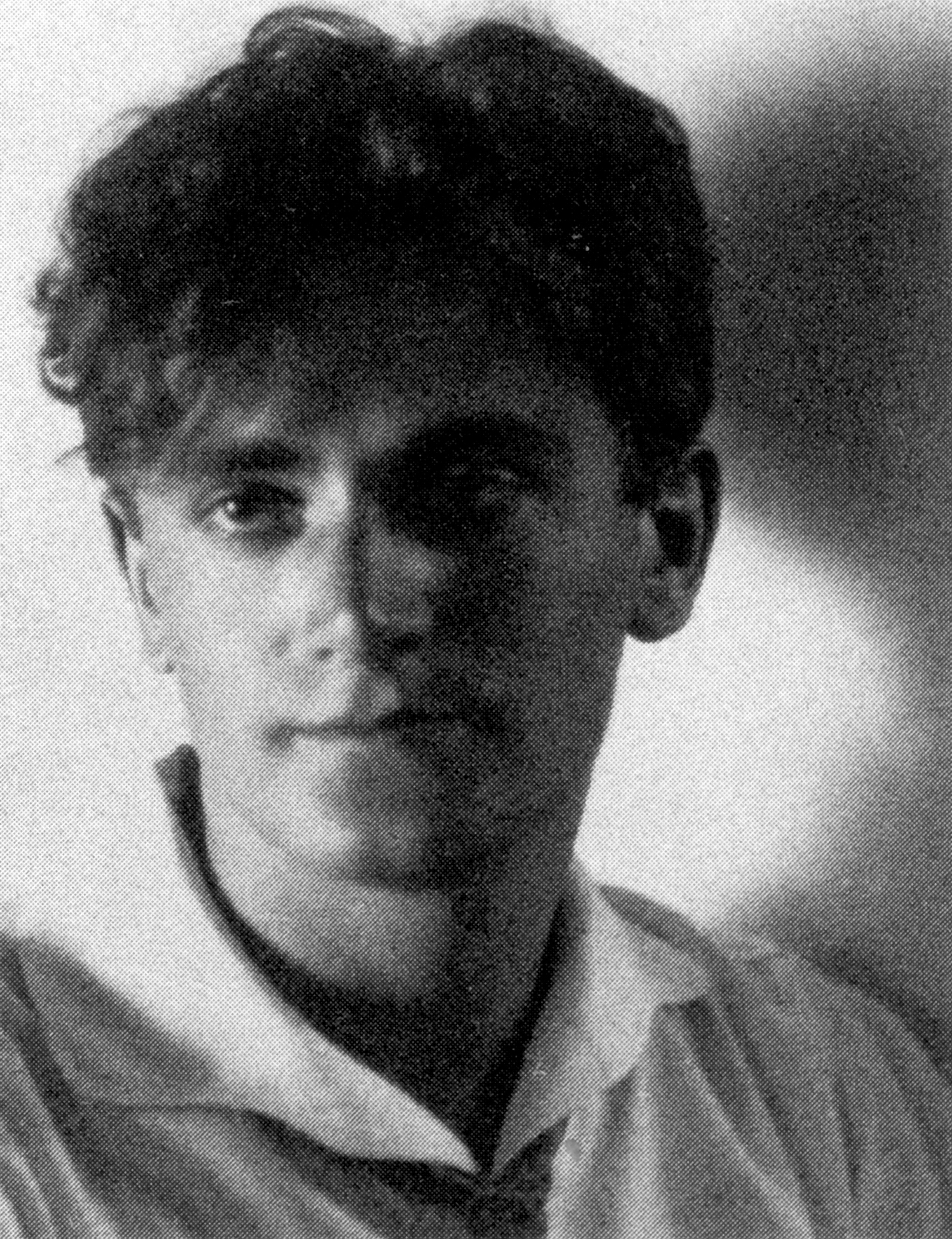
- Samuel Joseph Schweig (1927)
- Born: 1905; Ternopil, Austria-Hungary
- Died: March 19, 1984 (aged 78–79); Jerusalem, Israel
- Known for: Photography

Samuel Joseph Schweig, in Israel known as Shmuel Yosef Schweig (Hebrew: שמואל יוסף שוויג; 1905 in Tarnopol, Austria-Hungary – 19 March 1985 in Jerusalem, Israel) was an Israeli photographer.

== Biography ==
=== Early life in Europe ===
Shmuel Joseph Schweig (S.J. Schweig) was a photographer born in 1905 in Galicia, then part of the Austro-Hungarian Empire. He showed interest in photography still while in Tarnopol and later studied it in Vienna.

=== In Mandate Palestine and Israel ===
His Zionist convictions made him emigrate to the Land of Israel, then Mandate Palestine, already in 1922. Here he started his career photographing sites and landscapes of the country. Between 1925 and 1927 Schweig worked as a photographer for the JNF. In 1927 he established a workshop in Hanevi'im (Prophets) Street in Jerusalem. The first color photographs taken by a local photographer in Palestine were done by Schweig.

After specialising in archaeological photography, he became the chief photographer of the Department of Antiquities of the Mandatory administration, housed from 1938 onward by the Palestine Archaeological Museum, a.k.a. the Rockefeller Museum.

Beginning in the 1920s, his photographs helped shape the world's perception of the Zionist enterprise. But Shmuel Joseph Schweig is equally renowned as Israel's first artistic photographer of landscape and archaeology. Schweig is considered one of the most important of those who fashioned the image of Palestine, beginning in the 1920s, and he is identified with the Zionist enterprise and the nation-building project of the Jewish people. However, he saw himself above all as an artistic photographer; indeed, he is considered the first local art photographer of landscape and archaeology.

Some of the early photographs of the Great Isaiah Scroll – one of the Dead Sea Scrolls – were taken by Schweig.

== Book publications ==
He worked at several archaeological publications and was in charge of the illustration and layout of the Encyclopedia of Archaeological Excavations in the Holy Land (editor Michael Avi-Yonah, Prentice-Hall, 1978).

Schweig produced at the request of the office of the Secretary of State for the Colonies an album of Tegart forts known as "The Police Stations Plan 1940–1941", "The Wilson Brown Buildings" or "From Dan to Be'er Sheva".

== Museums and archives ==
The Schweig collection, which includes both glass and large gelatin negatives, is divided among the Israel Museum, the archive of the JNF, the Central Zionist Archives and the Rockefeller Museum. Many original prints, mostly small in size, are held by private collectors.

== Education ==
- 1921 Photography, Vienna and London
- 1930 London University, languages, and Photography School, London

== Titles, awards and prizes ==
- 1976 Honorary Fellow of the Royal Photographic Society of Great Britain
- 1977 Yakir Yerushalayim – "Worthy Citizen of Jerusalem"
- 1978 Enrique Kavlin Photography Prize, Israel Museum, Jerusalem, Israel
- Member of the Council of the Israel Exploration Society

== Selected exhibitions ==
The Open Museum for Photography, Tel Hai.

- 1971: a solo exhibition at the Israel Museum, Jerusalem
- 1985: second exhibition at the Israel Museum, Jerusalem
- 2010: "Shmuel Joseph Schweig: Photography as Material", at the Open Museum of Photography in the Tel Hai Industrial Park

== Articles ==
- Niche, 1 June 2010 (Hebrew)
- Masa Aher, 1 August 2010 (Hebrew)
- HA'ARETZ – GUIDE, 6 August 2010 (Hebrew)
- Yediyot Haifa, 3 September 2010 (Hebrew)

== See also ==
- Ze'ev Aleksandrowicz (1905–1992), Polish-born photographer, active in Mandate Palestine between 1932 and 1935
- Zoltan Kluger (1896–1977), important photographer in pre-state Israel
- David Rubinger (1924–2017), Israeli photographer, author of photo of paratroopers at the Western Wall in Six-Day War
- Herbert Sonnenfeld (1906–1972), German Jewish photographer, husband of Leni, photographed in Mandate Palestine in the 1930s
- Leni Sonnenfeld (1907–2004), German Jewish photographer, wife of Herbert, photographed Israel in the early years of its existence
- Rudi Weissenstein (1910–1999), Israeli photographer, author of iconic Declaration of Independence picture
