= Vagabond (magazine) =

Swedish travel magazine

- Editor-in-chief in Sweden: Fredrik Brändström
- Categories: Travel magazine
- Frequency: Monthly
- Circulation: 20,100 (2014)
- Publisher: Egmont Publishing AB
- Founded: 1987; 38 years ago
- Company: Egmont Group
- Country: Sweden
- Based in: Stockholm
- Language: Swedish
- Website: Vagabond

Vagabond is a travel magazine published in Sweden, Norway and Denmark. The magazine is one of the earliest travel magazines in the Scandinavia and publishes travel-related articles.

== History and profile ==
Vagabond was started in 1987. The Swedish magazine is owned by Egmont Group and is published by Egmont Publishing AB, a subsidiary of the group, on a monthly basis. Its headquarters is in Stockholm. Fredrik Brändström is the editor-in-chief of the magazine which is also distributed in Finland in Swedish. The Norwegian magazine is owned and published by Vagabond Forlag AS, a private publishing house with headquarters is Oslo, Norway. Julie Luneborg is the editor-in-chief of the magazine. Vagabond is also published in Denmark.

During its initial phase its target audience was backpackers, who visit foreign countries in a low-cost way, but later Vagabond began to target more affluent readers. The magazine encourages its readers to meet local people in their daily life.

In 2014 the circulation of Vagabond was 20,100 copies.
