= Odd Karsten Tveit =

Norwegian journalist, writer and economist

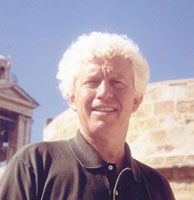
- Tveit in 2007
- Born: 17 December 1945 (age 79)
- Occupation(s): Journalist, correspondent, writer
- Agent: Norwegian Broadcasting Corporation
- Awards: Gullruten (2002); Brage Prize (2005)

Odd Karsten Tveit (born 17 December 1945) is a Norwegian journalist, writer and economist. His speciality is the Middle East, a subject on which he has written several books. Tveit has been a foreign correspondent for the Norwegian Broadcasting Corporation (NRK) in the Middle East through three periods, from 1979 to 1983, from 1990 to 1994, and from 2003 to 2007.

Tveit has also served as a major in the UNIFIL peacekeeping forces in Lebanon.

== Biography ==
Tveit has worked as a journalist for the Norwegian Broadcasting Corporation since 1973. To begin with he covered petroleum development in the North Sea. From 1977 Tveit has been attached to NRK's foreign editorial office ("utenriksredaksjonen").

== Foreign correspondent ==
=== Cairo 1978 ===
Tveit's first assignment as a foreign correspondent was in Cairo in 1978, a short-term replacement for Kjell Gjøstein Resi.

=== Beirut 1979–1983 ===
When Tveit started on his first permanent period as a foreign correspondent for NRK, in 1979, he relocated NRK's office from Cairo to Beirut. Tveit stayed in Beirut until 1983.

=== Amman 1990–1994 ===
During his next period as a Middle East correspondent, 1990–1994, the NRK office was based in Amman.

=== Amman 2003–2007 ===
Tveit was again Middle East correspondent for NRK from 2003 to 2007, when the office was based in Amman. In 2007 Sidsel Wold was assigned as NRK's new correspondent after Tveit had finished his period in Amman.

== Gullruten award ==
Tveit was responsible for the documentary program Brennpunkt: Sporene etter Sharon ("Focus: Tracks after Sharon"), broadcast by NRK in 2002. This program received the Gullruten award for best TV documentary in 2002.

== Books ==
Tveit wrote three books on energy politics in the early 1970s. From the mid-1980s the theme for his books has been the Middle East. He issued the book Alt for Israel. Oslo-Jerusalem 1948–1978 ("All for Israel") in 1996, and Krig og diplomati. Oslo-Jerusalem 1978–1996 ("War and Diplomacy") in 2005. He was awarded the Brage Prize for non-fiction in 2005, for Krig og diplomati.

== Controversy ==
In November 2025, claims were made about plagiarism in his book about Sylvia Raphael.

== Bibliography ==
Title	Pages	Year	Publisher	ISBN
Vår olje og vår kraft	93	1973	Grøndahl & Søn Forlag	82-504-0046-1
Nordsjøoljen	113	1973	Grøndahl & Søn Forlag	82-504-0022-4
Barentshavet – foran vanskelige grenseforhandlinger	26	1974	-	-
Nederlag : Israels krig i Libanon	322	1985	J.W. Cappelens Forlag	82-02-09346-5
Omveier til Palestina	91	1994	Undervisningsredaksjonen NRK Fjernsynet	82-711-8223-4
Alt for Israel : Oslo – Jerusalem 1948-78	761	1996	J.W. Cappelens Forlag	82-02-15732-3
Annas hus : en beretning fra Stavanger til Jerusalem	528	2000	J.W. Cappelens Forlag	82-02-18591-2
Krig & diplomati. Oslo – Jerusalem 1978-96	761	2005	H. Aschehoug & Co. (W. Nygaard)	82-03-22917-4
Libanon farvel : Israels første nederlag	630	2010	H. Aschehoug & Co. (W. Nygaard)	978-82-03-29227-9
De skyldige : Israel og Palestina – krigen, menneskene	1102	2015	Kagge Forlag	978-82-489-1687-1
Salongen i Jerusalem : tro, krig og spionasje	445	2016	Kagge Forlag	978-82-489-1888-2
Gudfaren : Trygve Lie – generalsekretæren som sviktet FN	454	2018	Kagge Forlag	978-82-489-2215-5
Midtøsten på 200 sider : 1820-2020	201	2020	Kagge Forlag	978-82-489-2642-9
Palestina : Israels ran, vårt svik	484	2023	Kagge Forlag	978-82-489-3309-0

=== Translations ===
Title	Pages	Year	Translator	Publisher	ISBN
Anna's House : The American Colony in Jerusalem (about Anna Spafford)	406	2011	Peter Scott-Hansen	Rimal Publications – Limassol, Cyprus	978-9963-610-40-2
Goodbye Lebanon : Israel's first defeat	424	2013	Peter Scott-Hansen	Rimal Publications – Limassol, Cyprus	978-9963-715-03-9
