= SS Ville du Havre =

French steamship sunk in 1873

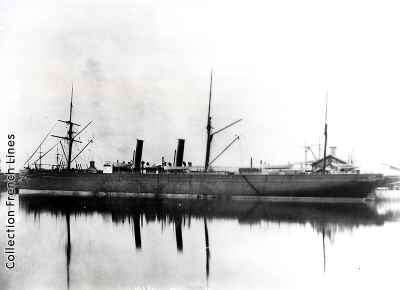
- Ville du Havre

History

French Navy Ensign
- Name: Ville du Havre
- Namesake: Le Havre
- Builder: Thames Iron Works Co
- Launched: 11 February 1865
- In service: 26 April 1866
- Out of service: 22 November 1873
- Fate: Sunk after collision with Loch Earn
- Notes: Originally named Napoléon III

General characteristics
- Type: Ocean liner
- Tonnage: 5,065 tons
- Length: 128.50 metres
- Beam: 14.08 metres
- Depth of hold: 22 ft 4 in (6.81 m)
- Propulsion: 1 compound inverted 4 cylinders

Ville du Havre (French: [vil dy avʁ]) was a French iron steamship that operated round trips between the northern coast of France and New York City. Launched in November 1865 under her original name of Napoléon III, she was converted from a paddle steamer to single propeller propulsion in 1871 and, in recognition of the recent defeat and removal from power of her imperial namesake, the Emperor Napoleon III, was renamed Ville du Havre. It was named after Le Havre, a major port city in the Normandy region of northern France.

In the early hours of 22 November 1873, Ville du Havre collided with the British three-masted iron clipper, Loch Earn and sank in 12 minutes with the loss of 226 lives. Only 61 passengers and 26 crew members survived, rescued by Loch Earn and subsequently Tremountain, an American vessel.

== History and description ==
Napoleon III was originally built as a paddle steamer by Thames Ironworks, London (engines by Ravenshill & Salked, London) for the Compagnie Générale Transatlantique (French Line). Launched on 11 February 1865, she was a 3,950 gross ton ship, length 111.5 m (365.9 ft) with 14.0 m (45.9 ft) beam, straight stem, two funnels, two masts, iron construction, paddle wheel propulsion and a cruising speed of 21.3 km/h; 13.2 mph (11.5 kn).

There was accommodation for 170 first class, 100 second class and 50 third class passengers. Launched in November 1865, she sailed on her maiden voyage from Le Havre for Brest and New York City on 26 April 1866. She made five round voyages on this service, the last commencing in August 1869.

In September 1871, she sailed from Le Havre to Tyneside in Northern England where she was lengthened to 128.5 m (421.7 ft) by A. Leslie and Company, Hebburn-on-Tyne and her tonnage increased to 5,065 tons. She was also fitted with a compound steam engine and rebuilt with single screw propulsion, and the paddle wheels were removed. A third mast was also fitted and after completion of the work, she was renamed Ville du Havre. Following sea trials, she recommenced her Le Havre – Brest – New York service in early 1873.

== Final voyage and sinking ==
On 15 November 1873, Ville du Havre sailed from New York with 313 passengers and crew on board, under the command of captain Marino Surmonte. She was bound for Le Havre, Seine-Inférieure. About halfway across the Atlantic Ocean, she collided with the iron clipper, Loch Earn at about 2 a.m. on Saturday, 22 November, at the position 47°21′N 35°31′W. At the time of the collision, Ville du Havre was proceeding under both steam and sail at about 12 kn (22 km/h; 14 mph).

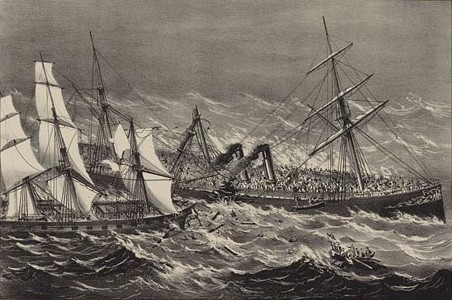
The sinking of Ville du Havre

The captain of Loch Earn, after first sighting Ville du Havre and realizing she was dangerously close, rang the ship's bell and "ported his helm", thus turning the boat to starboard. The helm of Loch Earn was put to starboard, but Ville du Havre came right across Loch Earn's bow. Ville du Havre was violently shaken by the collision and noise; all the passengers were awakened. Confused, most passengers went on deck, only to discover the ship was rapidly sinking. The captain assured them that all was fine, but in reality the ship had been nearly broken in two, and it did not take long for passengers to realize the situation was desperate. Commotion and chaos overtook panicked passengers. They started grabbing life preservers and trying to push lifeboats into the water. Unfortunately, these had recently been painted, and they were now stuck fast to the deck. Finally, a few of them were yanked loose, and passengers fought desperately to be one of the few travelers to board those boats.

Shortly after the collision, Ville du Havre's main and mizzen masts collapsed, smashing two of the liner's life boats and killing several people. The time for saving life was very short as the ship sank in less than 12 minutes, and finally broke into two pieces as she went. Captain Robertson of Loch Earn did all he possibly could to rescue the drowning and eventually 26 passengers and 61 of the crew were rescued and taken on board that ship. However, 226 passengers and crew perished.

Loch Earn, herself in danger of sinking, was subsequently rescued by the American cargo ship, Tremountain and all Ville du Havre passengers and crew were transferred to that ship. Loch Earn, with its bow smashed in, commenced to sink as the bulkheads gave way, so she was abandoned at sea by her crew and sank shortly afterwards. She had been on a voyage from Bristol to New York.

== Notable passengers ==
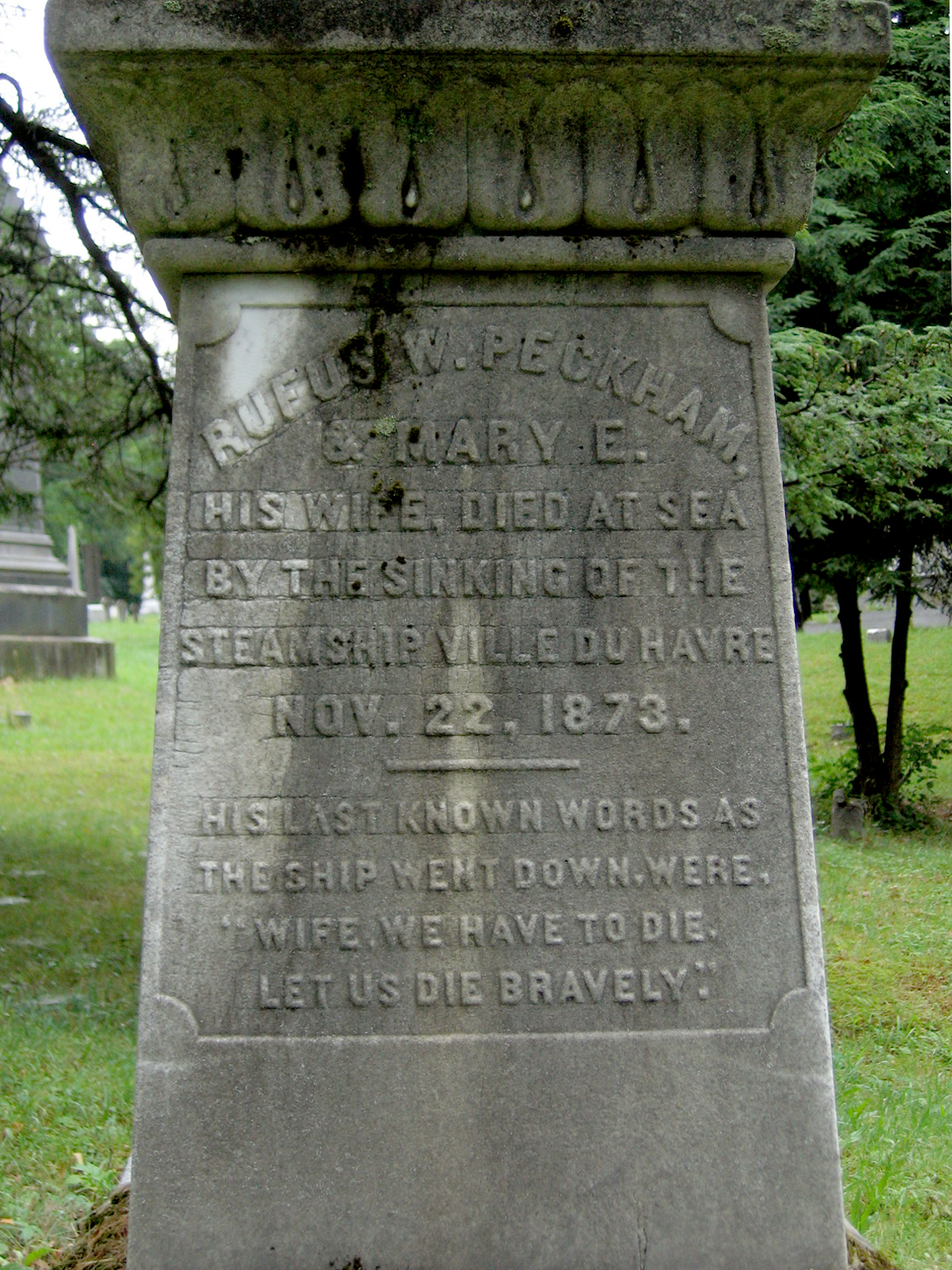
Inscription on Peckham's cenotaph at Albany Rural Cemetery

Rufus Wheeler Peckham, a judge and Democratic Congressman from New York, and his wife Mary were on board and both perished. The couple were en route to southern France to improve his failing health. Peckham's last words were reported to be "Wife, we have to die, let us die bravely." His remains were never recovered, and his cenotaph (pictured) was erected at Albany Rural Cemetery in Menands, New York.

Princeton graduate Hamilton Murray and his sister Martha died in the accident, and the Hamilton Murray theater at Princeton (longtime home of Theatre Intime) was subsequently named in his honor – he had left $20,000 in his will to the university. Also among the victims were the French caricaturist Victor Collodion and his wife, and the Venezuelan musician, lawyer and politician Felipe Larrazábal.

=== Spafford family tragedy ===
Chicago lawyer and Presbyterian elder Horatio Spafford was to have been a passenger on board Ville du Havre. However, at the last moment, Spafford was detained by real estate business, so his Norwegian-born wife, Anna Spafford, went on ahead for Paris with their four daughters. After the collision, only Mrs. Spafford was rescued. She was picked up unconscious and floating upon a plank of wood and then taken aboard Loch Earn.

A fellow survivor, Pastor Nathanael Weiss, later quoted Anna Spafford as saying, "God gave me four daughters. Now they have been taken from me. Someday I will understand why".

Nine days after the shipwreck, the survivors landed at Cardiff, Wales. Anna Spafford telegraphed her husband, "Saved alone. What shall I do . . ." Upon receiving her telegram, Horatio Spafford immediately left Chicago to bring his wife home. During the Atlantic crossing, the Captain called Spafford into his cabin to tell him that they were passing over the spot where his four daughters had drowned.

Spafford later wrote to Rachel, his wife's half-sister, "On Thursday last we passed over the spot where she went down, in mid-ocean, the waters three miles deep. But I do not think of our dear ones there. They are safe, folded, the dear lambs". During that same voyage, Spafford penned the beloved Protestant hymn It Is Well with My Soul. Philip Bliss, who composed the music for the hymn, called his tune Ville du Havre, after the sunken vessel.

== Gallery ==
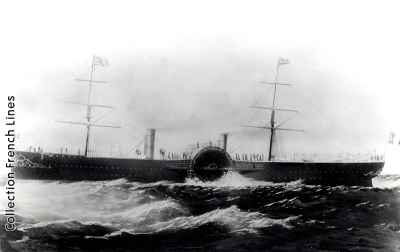
Napoleon III

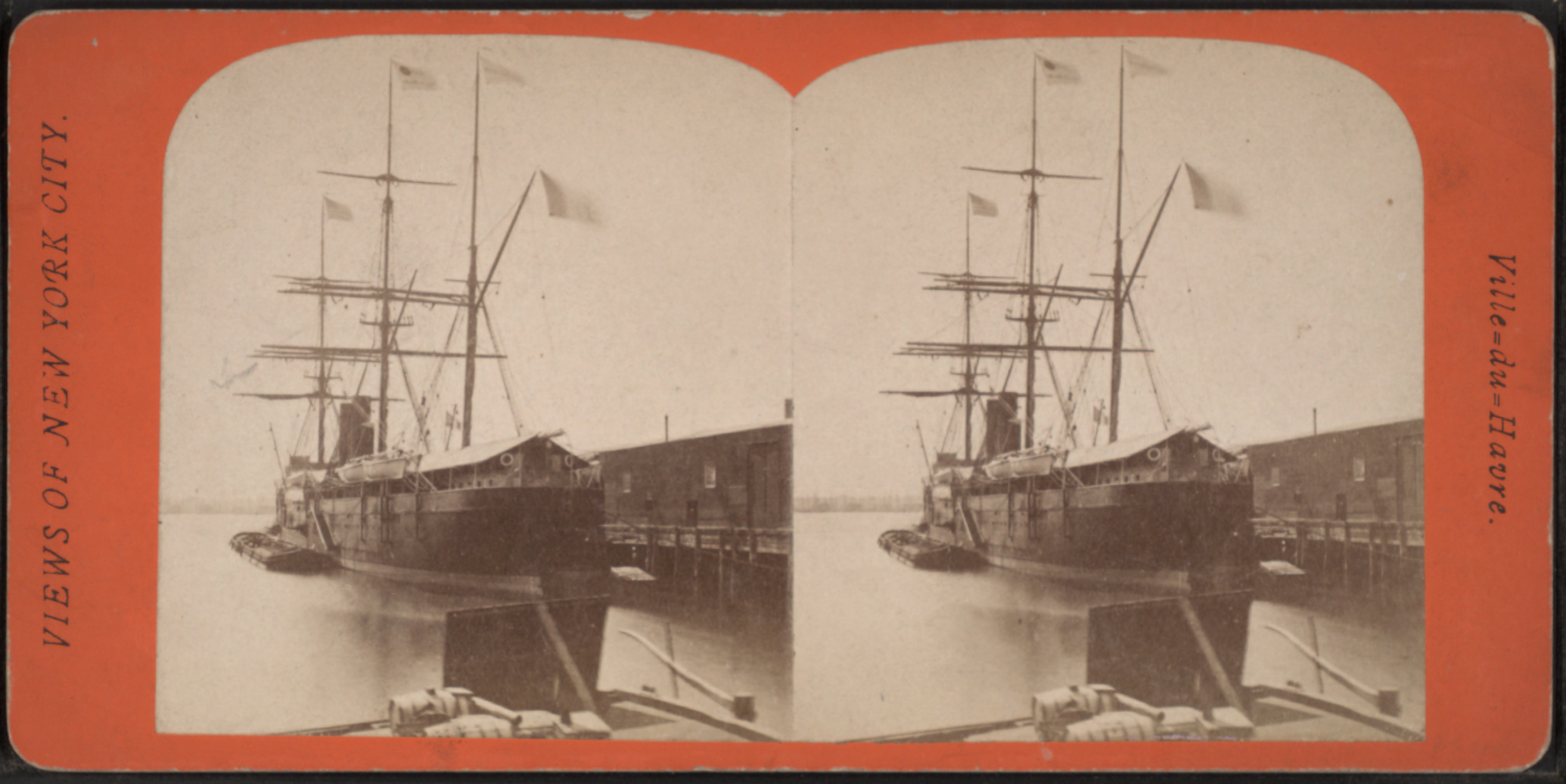
stereoscopic photograph of the Ville du Havre
