= It Is Well with My Soul =

Christian hymn written by Horatio Spafford in 1873

It Is Well With My Soul
- by Horatio Spafford
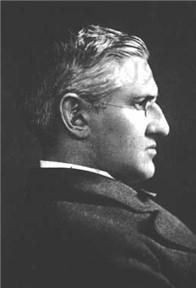
- Horatio Spafford
- Genre: Hymn
- Written: 1873
- Meter: 11.8.11.9 with refrain
- Melody: "Ville du Havre" by Philip Bliss
- Published: 1876 by Biglow & Main and John Church Company

"It Is Well With My Soul", also known as "When Peace, Like A River", is a hymn penned by hymnist Horatio Spafford and composed by Philip Bliss. First published in Gospel Hymns No. 2 by Ira Sankey and Bliss (1876), it is possibly the most influential and enduring in the Bliss repertoire and is often taken as a choral model, appearing in hymnals of a wide variety of Christian fellowships. (Note: The presence of a refrain makes the item technically a gospel song versus a hymn in the strict sense.)

== Background ==
The hymn was written after traumatic events in Spafford's life. The first was the Great Chicago Fire of 1871, which ruined him financially (Spafford had been a successful lawyer and had invested significantly in property in the area of Chicago that was extensively damaged by the great fire). His business interests were further hit by the economic downturn of 1873, at which time Spafford had planned to travel to England with his family on the SS Ville du Havre, to help with Dwight L. Moody's upcoming evangelistic campaigns. In a late change of plan, Spafford sent his wife, Anna, and their four daughters, Annie, Maggie, Bessie, and Tanetta, ahead while Spafford was delayed on business concerning zoning problems following the Great Chicago Fire. While crossing the Atlantic Ocean, the ship sank rapidly after a collision with a sea vessel, the Loch Earn, killing 226 people, including Annie, Maggie, Bessie, and Tanetta. Anna survived and sent Spafford the now famous telegram, "Saved alone ...". Shortly afterwards, as he traveled to England to meet his grieving wife, Spafford was inspired to write these words as his ship passed the spot near where his four daughters had died. Bliss called his tune Ville du Havre, from the name of the stricken vessel.

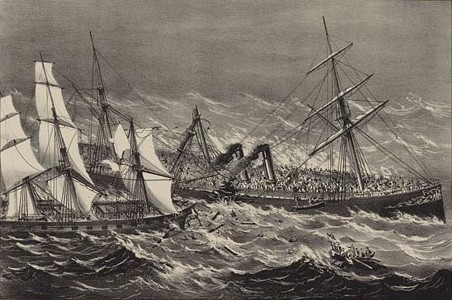
The sinking of the steamship Ville du Havre

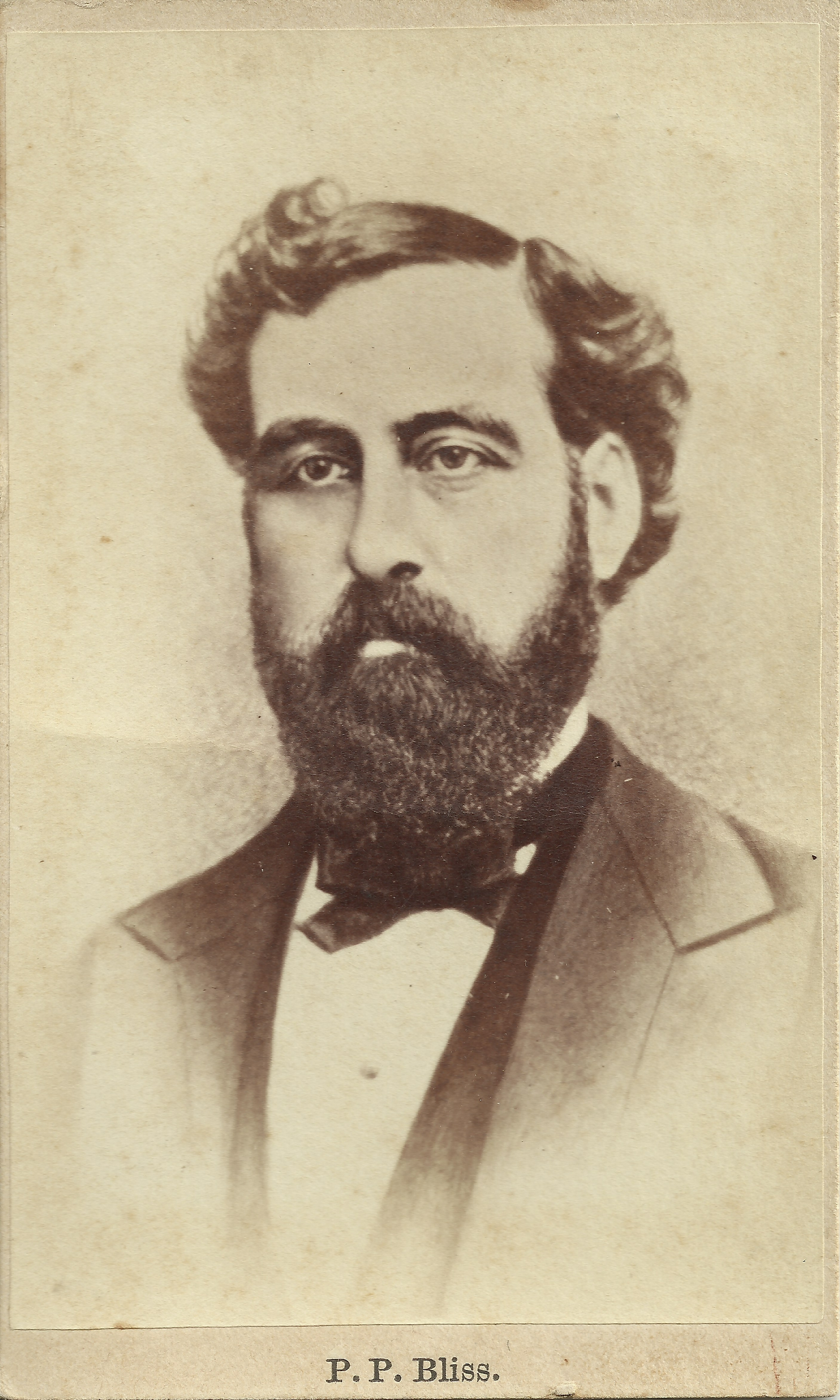
Philip Bliss

== Original lyrics ==
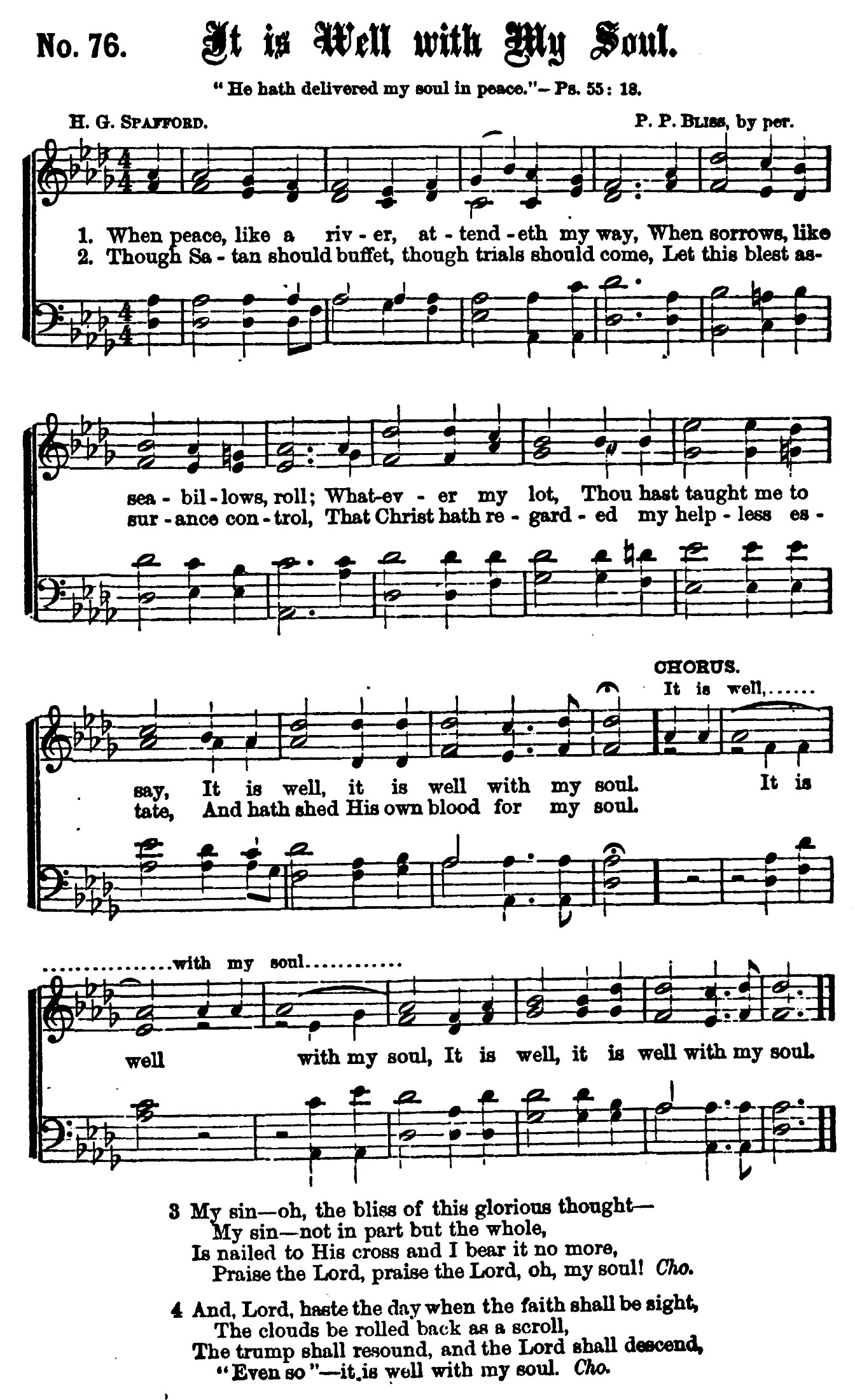
It is Well with My Soul, first print 1876

When peace like a river, attendeth my way,
When sorrows like sea billows roll;
Whatever my lot, Thou hast taught me to know (Note: "know" (at the end of the third line) was changed to "say".)
It is well, it is well, with my soul.

Refrain
It is well, (it is well),
With my soul, (with my soul)
It is well, it is well, with my soul.

Though Satan should buffet, though trials should come,
Let this blest assurance control,
That Christ hath regarded my helpless estate,
And hath shed His own blood for my soul.

My sin, oh, the bliss of this glorious thought!
My sin, not in part but the whole,
Is nailed to His cross, and I bear it no more,
Praise the Lord, praise the Lord, O my soul!

For me, be it Christ, be it Christ hence to live:
If Jordan above me shall roll,
No pang shall be mine, for in death as in life,
Thou wilt whisper Thy peace to my soul.

But Lord, 'tis for Thee, for Thy coming we wait,
The sky, not the grave, is our goal;
Oh, trump of the angel! Oh, voice of the Lord!
Blessed hope, blessed rest of my soul.

And Lord, haste the day when the faith shall be sight,
The clouds be rolled back as a scroll;
The trump shall resound, and the Lord shall descend,
A song in the night, oh my soul! (Note: "A song in the night, oh my soul" (last line) was changed to "Even so, it is well with my soul".)

== 150th Anniversary ==
2023 marked the 150th anniversary of It Is Well with My Soul. There were commemoration services held to remember the actual day of the tragedy, November 22, and a new edition of the book It Is Well with My Soul: from tragedy to trust, was also published in the anniversary year.
