= Ze'ev Aleksandrowicz =

Israeli photographer (1905–1992)

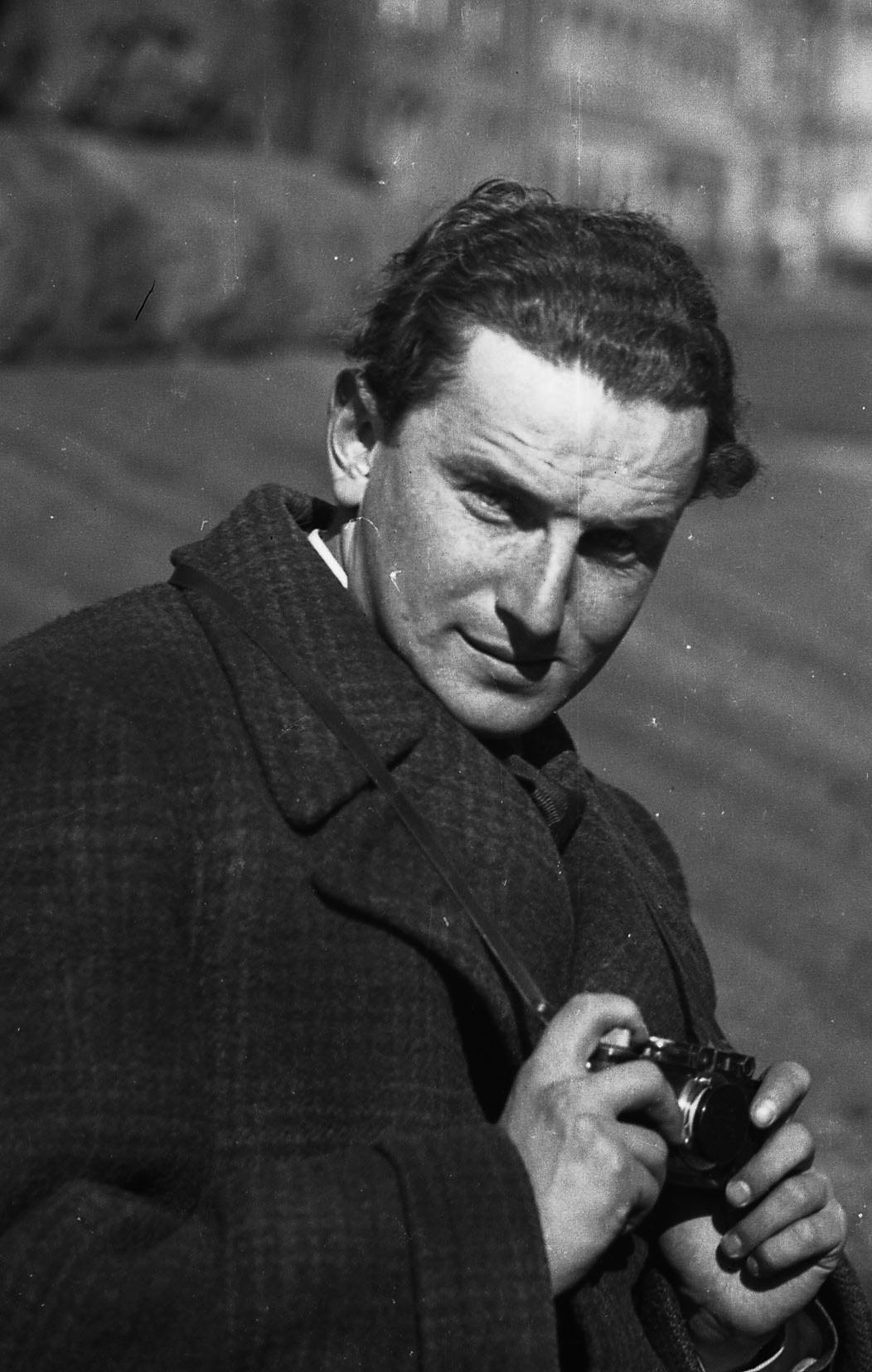
Ze'ev Aleksandrowicz in Kraków, the 1930s

Ze'ev (Wilhelm) Aleksandrowicz (Hebrew: 'זאב אלכסנדרוביץ; April 7, 1905 – January 5, 1992) was an Israeli photographer. He is mostly known for his work in Palestine and Japan, during the first half of the 1930s.

== Early life ==
Aleksandrowicz was born in Kraków in 1905 to a Jewish family. His father, Sinaj Zygmunt, the owner of a prominent paper wholesale business, was communally and philanthropically active as a member of the city council and one of the leaders of the Jewish community. His mother, Hela Rakower, was a descendant of one of the largest and long-standing Jewish families in Kraków. Aleksandrowicz studied in a Hebrew primary school and in a Polish high school, after which he was sent by his family for higher education at trade schools in Vienna and Basel to prepare him for the family business.

== Photography career ==
Aleksandrowicz had been attracted to photography from a young age. His aunt Róża, who ran a renowned art supplies business across from the Arts Academy in Kraków and who was connected to the artistic and cultural circles of the city, gave him his first camera. During the 1920s he took many pictures in Poland and in other European countries, producing hundreds of photos.

At the beginning of the 1930s, Aleksandrowicz acquired a couple of modern Leica 35 mm cameras, which gave him flexibility in choosing his subjects. He began to travel further afield with his camera, producing photographs in Poland, Japan, the United States, Egypt and in a considerable number of other countries.

Aleksandrowicz was an active and enthusiastic supporter of the Zionist idea. Between the years of 1932 and 1935 he visited Palestine three times and took thousands of photographs, mainly in Tel Aviv and Jaffa, Haifa, Jerusalem, Tiberias, Hadera, the Jezreel Valley and the Jordan Valley. He also took portrait photographs of central figures in the Zionist movement of the time, including Hayim Nahman Bialik, Uri Zvi Greenberg, Ze'ev Jabotinsky, Abba Ahimeir, Haim Arlosoroff, Nahum Sokolow, Yitzhak Ben-Zvi and others.

In conversations with members of his family, Aleksandrowicz defined himself as an "amateur photographer," that is, a photographer not dependent on photography for a living and free to choose his subjects as he wishes. This attitude did not, however, prevent him from trying to have his work published. Aleksandrowicz offered his photographs to a number of Jewish and Zionist papers in Poland and the United States, which published them as photo reports in Aleksandrowicz's name.

In 1936, Aleksandrowicz married Lea Chelouche, the daughter of one of the long-standing families in the Jewish Yishuv. The couple had four children. After settling in Palestine in the same year, Aleksandrowicz stopped photographing almost completely, except for occasional photographs of close family members. The reasons for this remain unclear. Nevertheless, in the late Fifties Aleksandrowicz took a photograph of the Swiss paediatrician Guido Fanconi in Zurich that became the most emblematic picture of the famous paediatrician.

== Death and rediscovery ==
Aleksandrowicz died in Tel Aviv on January 5th, 1992. Eleven years after his death, a tattered leather suitcase was discovered by chance at his home, in which the fruit of his art was hidden – more than 15,000 negatives found rolled up in rusty tin boxes. The great majority of these negatives had not been printed during his lifetime. Researchers and professionals judged the worth and value of the collection following a lengthy process of scanning and identifying of photographs by place, person, and date. It remains a wonder to his family that he had never mentioned the existence of this large negative collection, especially after receiving renewed recognition as a photographer in his final years.

Since 2010 the Aleksandrowicz collection, held by the photographer's family, can be accessed on-line through a dedicated internet site of the National Library of Israel.

== Exhibitions and catalogues ==
- Jewish Heritage in the Eye of the Camera, Museum of the Jewish Diaspora, 1984
- Our Man in Japan: Ze'ev Aleksandrowicz's Photographs from his Journey to Japan in 1934, Manggha Museum of Japanese Art and Technology, 2008
  - Our Man in Japan, catalogue of the exhibition (English and Polish)
- Japan 1934: The Photographs of Ze'ev Aleksandrowicz, Tikotin Museum of Japanese Art, 2008.
- Swirling Sands: Tel Aviv of the 1930s through the Lens of Ze'ev Aleksandrowicz, Galicia Jewish Museum, 2009
  - Swirling Sands, catalogue of the exhibition (English and Hebrew)
- Poland and Palestine: Two Lands and Two Skies: Cracovian Jews in the Photographs of Ze'ev Aleksandrowicz, Galicia Jewish Museum, 2011–12
  - Poland and Palestine: Two Lands and Two Skies, catalogue of the exhibition (English and Polish)
- Between Haifa and Jericho: Historic Cities in the Photographs of Ze'ev Aleksandrowicz, Haifa City Museum, 2014
  - Between Haifa and Jericho, catalogue of the exhibition (English, Hebrew and Arabic)
- Israel Before Israel: Photographs by Ze’ev Aleksandrowicz 1932–1936, Jewish Museum Vienna, 2017
  - Israel Before Israel: Photographs by Ze’ev Aleksandrowicz 1932–1936, catalogue of the exhibition (German and English)

== See also ==
Photographers active in Ottoman and Mandate Palestine 1900–1948

- American Colony, Jerusalem#Photography: see for its Photographic Department, later Matson Photographic Service, active c. 1900-1940s
- Armenians in Israel#Photographers: see for Armenian photographers in Jerusalem since 1857
- Zoltan Kluger (1896–1977), important photographer in pre-state Israel
- Khalil Raad (1854–1957), known as "Palestine's first Arab photographer"
- David Rubinger (1924–2017), Israeli photographer, author of photo of paratroopers at the Western Wall in Six-Day War
- de:Herbert Sonnenfeld (1906–1972), German Jewish photographer, husband of Leni, photographed in Mandate Palestine in the 1930s
- Leni Sonnenfeld (1907–2004), German Jewish photographer, wife of Herbert, photographed Israel in the early years of its existence
- Rudi Weissenstein (1910–1999), Israeli photographer, author of iconic Declaration of Independence picture

== Bibliography ==
- Dobroszycki, L. and B. Kirshenblatt-Gimblett (1994). Image Before My Eyes: A Photographic History of Jewish Life in Poland, 1864–1939. New York: Schocken.
- Stawarz, J. (2008). Our Man in Japan: Ze'ev Aleksandrowicz's Photographs from his Journey to Japan in 1934. Kraków: Manggha Museum of Japanese Art and Technology.
- Aleksandrowicz, O. and S. Aleksandrowicz (2009). Swirling Sands: Tel Aviv of the 1930s through the Lens of Ze'ev Aleksandrowicz. Tel Aviv: The Ze'ev Aleksandrowicz Estate.
- Dror Lax, I. (2014). Between Haifa and Jericho: Five Cities, Three Years, One Photographer. Haifa: Haifa City Museum.
- Winklbauer, A. (2017). A Life on Film—The Trace of the Photographer Ze’ev Aleksandrowicz, in Israel Before Israel: Photographs by Ze’ev Aleksandrowicz 1932–1936. Vienna: Vienna Jewish Museum.
