= Herbert Sonnenfeld =

German photographer

Herbert Siegfried Sonnenfeld (born September 29, 1906 in Berlin-Neukölln; died 1972 in New York) was a German photographer. He documented Jewish life in Berlin and the surrounding area in the 1930s.

== Life ==
Herbert Sonnenfeld was the son of Josef and Charlotte Sonnenfeld, who ran a haberdashery store in Berlin's Hermannstraße. After finishing school, he worked for some time in an uncle's haberdashery store before becoming a salesman for alarm systems. He married in 1931 and moved with his wife Leni to an apartment in Joachimsthaler Straße, where he set up a darkroom as an enthusiastic amateur photographer.

== Nazi era ==
When the Nazis came to power in 1933, Herbert Sonnenfeld was persecuted under anti-Jewish laws due to his heritage. He was dismissed from his job. The Sonnenfeld couple tried to emigrate to Palestine, but were rejected as unqualified and too poor. Nevertheless, Herbert Sonnenfeld undertook a trip to Palestine on his own initiative in 1933 and documented the life of Yishuv there. He returned to Berlin after just two weeks, now convinced that he would not be able to live under the “too primitive conditions” in Palestine anyway, according to his impressions.

After this trip, his wife Leni, who often assisted him in taking photographs, offered her husband's pictures to various Jewish newspapers. The response was positive and from then on Herbert Sonnenfeld worked as a press photographer for Jewish newspapers and organizations. Among other things, he documented events organized by the Cultural Association of German Jews, took pictures of the Jewish Museum, which had its headquarters at Oranienburger Straße 31 from 1933 to 1938, of artists and artisans, and of the Jewish community.

The news that the visas for entry into the USA, which the couple had been trying to obtain since the mid-1930s, were ready arrived the day after the German invasion of Poland.

When Herbert and Leni Sonnenfeld were able to emigrate to New York at the end of 1939, they only took a small part of the paintings they had created in the previous years with them.[3] They had traveled by train to Trieste and boarded a ship there that took them to the USA. Herbert Sonnenfeld had a married brother in New York, and the couple was also supported by the American Jewish Congress, which provided them with an apartment and a photo studio.[1] The Sonnenfelds continued their work in New York, where they also continued to specialize in Jewish subjects. Herbert Sonnenfeld was the only photographer to accompany the conference of the Zionist Organization of America at the Biltmore Hotel in New York in May 1942. A few months later, he was called up for military service and sent to England. There he took photographs in the Litchfield Barracks reception camp. Meanwhile, Leni Sonnenfeld continued to pursue her own career as a photographer in New York. Among other things, she documented the Fort Ontario refugee center in Oswego in 1944. She later worked for publications such as the New York Times and Life Magazine, but also for numerous Jewish organizations, and travelled to many countries.

== Legacy ==
In 1988, the Jewish Department of the Berlin Museum, supported by the Stiftung Deutsche Klassenlotterie Berlin, purchased part of Herbert Sonnenfeld's estate and two years later organized an exhibition entitled Herbert Sonnenfeld. A Jewish Photographer in Berlin 1933-1938. After the Jewish Museum Berlin opened in 2001, the collection was inventoried there and gradually digitized. From November 2012, the museum's own collections were made available online; Herbert Sonnenfeld's photographs were among the first exhibits to be made accessible to the public in this way.

== Literature ==
Maren Krüger: Herbert Sonnenfeld. Ein jüdischer Fotograf in Berlin 1933–1938. 2. Auflage. Nicolai, 1992, ISBN 978-3-87584-322-4.

Leni Sonnenfeld: Eyes of Memory. Photographs from the Archives of Herbert & Leni Sonnenfeld. Yale University Press, 2004, ISBN 978-0-300-10605-3.
