= Anna Spafford =

Woman who established an American Colony

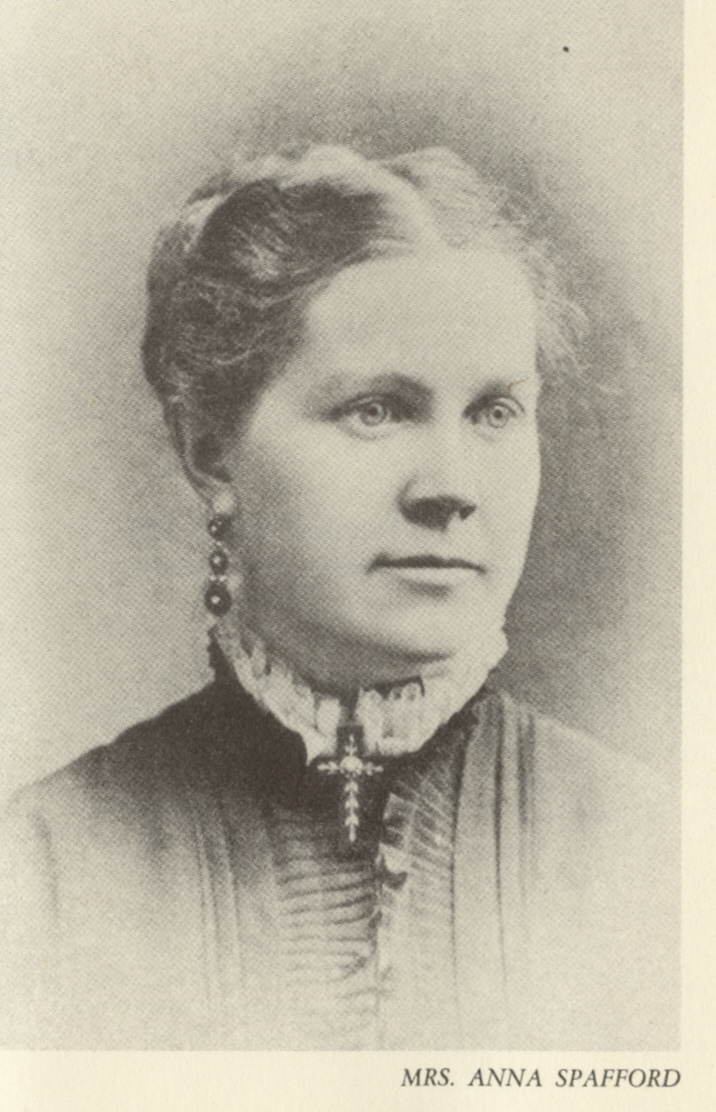
Anna Spafford

Anna Spafford (March 16, 1842 – April 17, 1923), born Anne Tobine Larsen Øglende in Stavanger, Norway, was a Norwegian-American woman who settled in Jerusalem, where she and her husband Horatio Spafford were central in establishing the American Colony there in 1881.

Spafford was a survivor of the sinking of the French passenger steamer Ville du Havre in November 1873. Her four daughters, Anna “Annie” (born June 11, 1862), Margaret Lee “Maggie” (born May 31, 1864), Elizabeth “Bessie” (born June 19, 1868), and Tanetta (born July 24, 1871) were lost in the wreck. Afterwards, Anna gave birth to three more children and adopted a Jewish teenager. Her husband wrote the song It Is Well with My Soul after the various tragedies that struck them, which included the Chicago fire and the loss of their four daughters in the sinking of Ville du Havre.

== Literature ==
- Geniesse, Jane Fletcher, American Priestess: The Extraordinary Story of Anna Spafford and the American Colony in Jerusalem, Nan A. Talese (2008) ISBN 0-385-51926-5
- Tveit, Odd Karsten, Annas hus, En beretning fra Stavanger til Jerusalem, Cappelen forlag, Oslo (2000) ISBN 82-02-18591-2
