= Rudi Weissenstein =

Israeli photographer (1910–1992)

Rudi Weissenstein רודי ויסנשטין
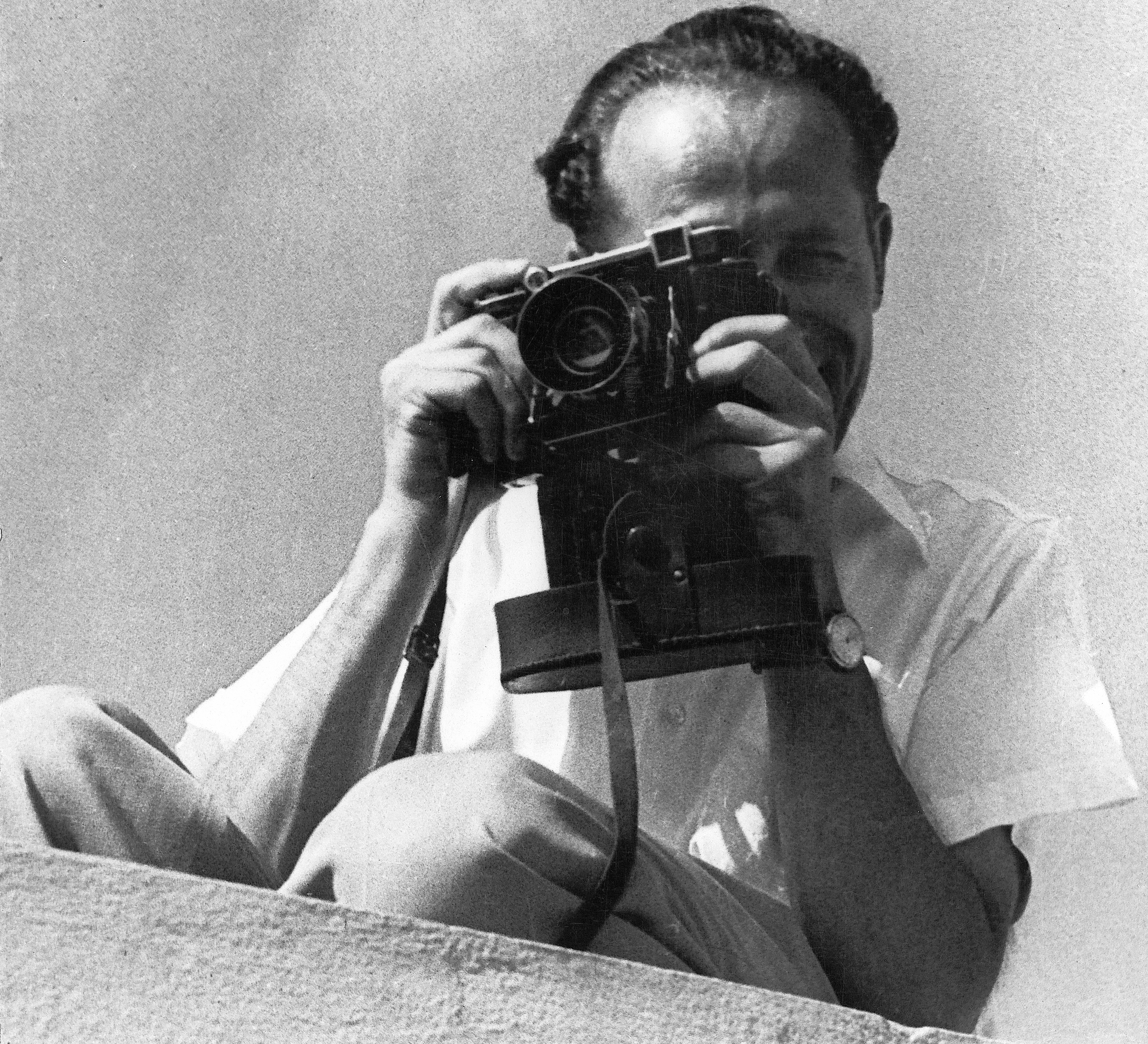
- Weissenstein in 1940
- Born: Shimon Rudolf Weissenstein; 17 February 1910; Jihlava, Bohemia, Austro-Hungary
- Died: 20 October 1992 (aged 82); Tel Aviv, Israel
- Known for: photography

Shimon Rudolf "Rudi" Weissenstein (Hebrew: רודי ויסנשטין; February 17, 1910 – October 20, 1992) was an Israeli photographer. He was best known for his extensive documentation of the everyday life of Jewish immigrants in the 1930s. The only photographs of Israel's declaration of independence by David Ben Gurion in 1948 are by Weissenstein, who built a collection of over a million negatives.

== Biography ==
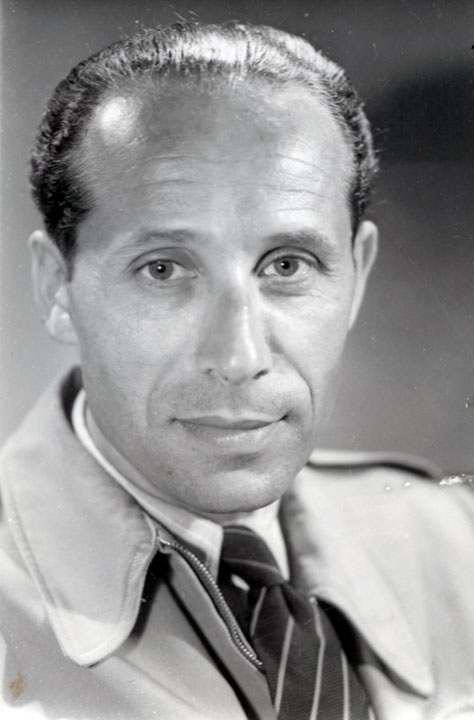
Weissenstein in 1936

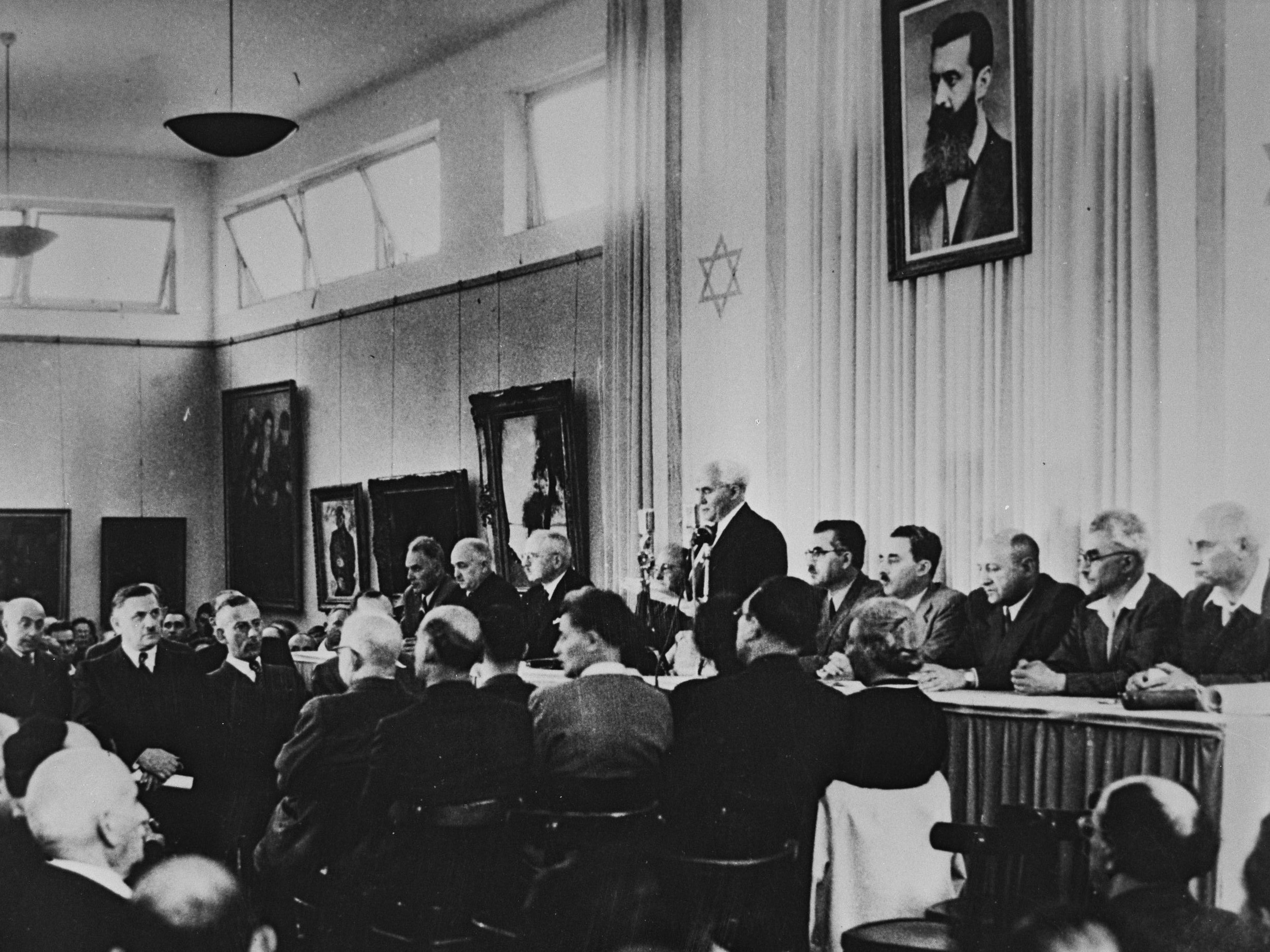
David Ben Gurion reading the Declaration of Independence

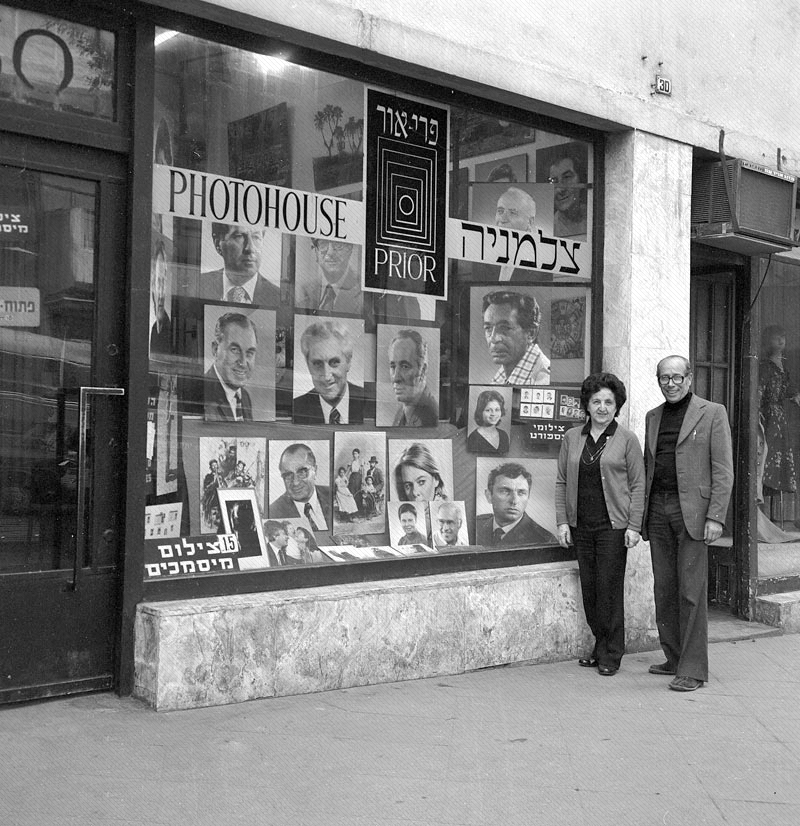
Rudi and Miriam Weissenstein in 1979

Rudi Weissenstein was born on 17 February 1910 in the Bohemian-Moravian town of Jihlava and grew up as one of four children. From 1929 to 1931, he completed an apprenticeship as a book printer at the Graphische Lehr- und Versuchsanstalt in Vienna. He then completed his military service in the Czechoslovak army and then worked as a photographer at the Prague and Vienna newspapers. Since 1934, Weissenstein planned his emigration to Palestine and he left Europe in the late 1935, reaching Haifa in January 1936. He continued to work as a photographer and journalist and in 1940 married Miriam Arnstein (1913–2011), who had studied dance and acrobatics in Vienna and had emigrated to Palestine before Weissenstein. Together they opened Photo House Pri-Or in Tel Aviv on Allenby street in 1940. Weissenstein documented the Jewish everyday and cultural life in Tel Aviv, including numerous prominent personalities – artists and politicians, such as Marc Chagall, Max Brod, Eleanor Roosevelt, Isaac Stern and the painter Nahum Gutman. He photographed for the Israel Philharmonic Orchestra since the first concert conducted by Arturo Toscanini. Weissenstein's most well-known photograph is that of the Declaration of Independence of the State of Israel on May 14, 1948, by David Ben Gurion, where he was the only accredited photographer.

== Legacy ==
Rudi Weissenstein died in 1992 and his estate – a photo archive of more than 250,000 negatives was managed and maintained by his widow until her death in 2011. Since 2011, the archive and Photo House is managed by his grandson Ben Peter Weissenstein in a new store on Tshernichovski Street, received from the Tel Aviv municipality. Miriam Weissenstein and Ben Peter Weissenstein were part of the documentary film "Life In Stills" by Tamar Tal, dealing among other things with the history of Rudi Weissenstein's photo house.

=== Exhibitions ===
Weissenstein's photographs have been shown and awarded numerous prizes in Israel and abroad, among others in 1961 with the award at the International Photography Exhibition in Moscow for the recording "Working Hands". His works were exhibited in Heussenstamm Gallery in Frankfurt, Germany; Eckhart Gallery, The Hague; The Jewish Museum in Munich, Germany. The last exhibition in Germany "Your happy eyes" in 2010 was opened by Miriam Weissenstein.

== Bibliography ==
- Dvir Ori: Rudi Weissenstein. Israel Early Photographs. Modan Publishing House, Ben-Shemen 2008, ISBN 965-7141-10-9.
- Michal Amram, Anna-Patricia Kahn, Ben Peter (Hrsg.): Rudi. Discovering the Weissenstein Archive. Kehrer Verlag, Heidelberg 2016, ISBN 978-3-86828-745-5.
