= Horatio Spafford =

American poet and lawyer (1828–1888)

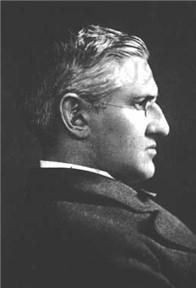
- Portrait of Spafford
- Born: Horatio Gates Spafford; October 20, 1828; Troy, New York, U.S.
- Died: September 25, 1888 (aged 59); Jerusalem, Ottoman Empire
- Occupations: Lawyer; poet
- Notable work: "It Is Well with My Soul"
- Spouse: Anna Larsen (m. 1861)
- Children: 8

Horatio Gates Spafford (October 20, 1828, Troy, New York – September 25, 1888, Jerusalem, Ottoman Empire) was an American lawyer and Presbyterian church elder. He is best known for penning the Christian hymn "It Is Well With My Soul" following the Great Chicago Fire (1871), and the deaths of his four daughters on a transatlantic voyage aboard the S.S. Ville du Havre.

== Biography ==
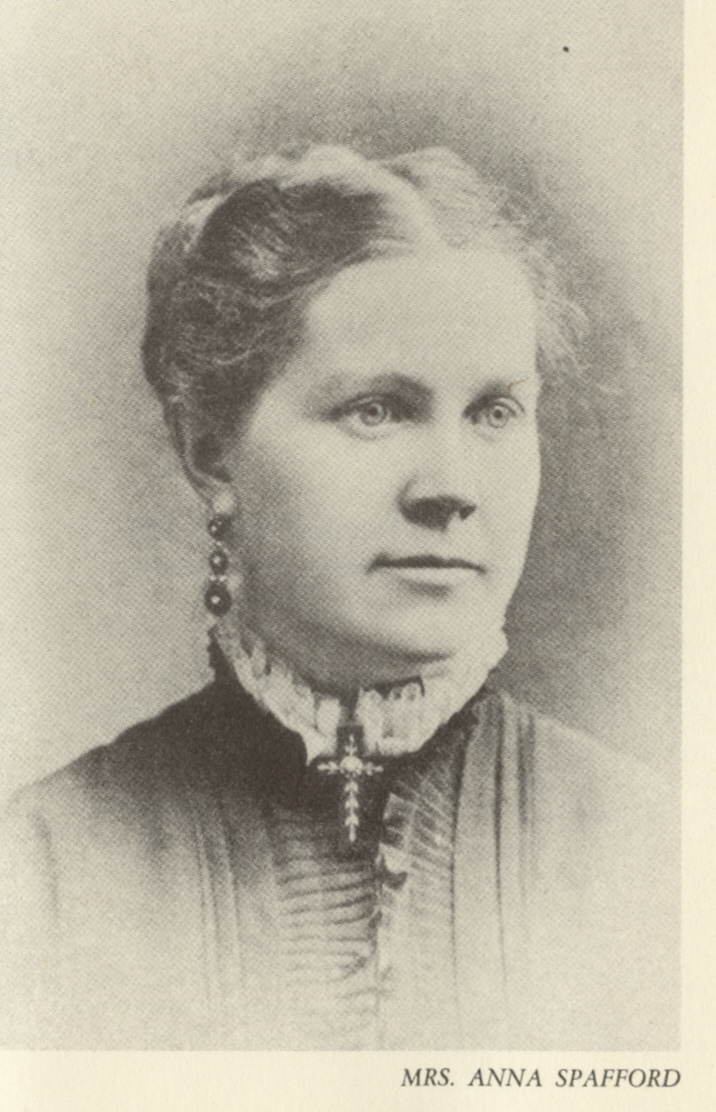
Anna Spafford

Spafford was the son of Gazetteer author Horatio Gates Spafford and Elizabeth Clark Hewitt Spafford. On September 5, 1861, Spafford married Anna Larsen of Stavanger, Norway, in Chicago. Spafford was a lawyer and a senior partner in a large law firm. The Spaffords were supporters and friends of evangelist Dwight L. Moody.

Spafford invested in real estate north of Chicago in the spring of 1871. However, in October 1871, the Great Fire of Chicago reduced the city to ashes, destroying most of Spafford's investment.

Two years after the Great Chicago Fire, the Spaffords planned a trip to Europe. Business demands (zoning issues arising from the conflagration) kept Spafford from joining his wife and four daughters on the family vacation in England, where his friend D. L. Moody would be preaching. On November 22, 1873, while crossing the Atlantic on the steamship Ville du Havre, the ship was struck by an iron sailing vessel, killing 226 people, including all four of Spafford's daughters: Annie, age 12; Maggie, 7; Bessie, 5; and Tanetta, 2. His wife, Anna, survived the tragedy. Upon arriving in Cardiff, Wales, she sent a telegram to Spafford that read "Saved alone." Shortly afterwards, as Spafford traveled to meet his grieving wife, he was inspired to write It Is Well with My Soul as his ship passed near where his daughters had died.

Following the sinking of the Ville du Havre, Anna gave birth to three more children, Horatio Goertner (November 16, 1875), Bertha Hedges (March 24, 1878), and Grace (January 18, 1881). On February 11, 1880, their son Horatio died of scarlet fever at age four. This final tragedy began Spafford's move away from material success toward a lifelong spiritual pilgrimage. The couple left the Presbyterian congregation and began to host prayer meetings in their home. Their Messianic sect was dubbed "the Overcomers" by the American press.

In August 1881, the Spaffords settled in Jerusalem as part of a group of 13 adults and three children, establishing the American Colony. Colony members, joined by Swedish Christians, engaged in philanthropic work among the people of Jerusalem regardless of religious affiliation, gaining the trust of the local Muslim, Jewish, and Christian communities. Membership in the colony required both single and married adherents to declare celibacy, and children were separated from their parents. Child labor was used in various business endeavors while in Jerusalem.

In Jerusalem, Spafford and his wife adopted a teenager named Jacob Eliahu (1864–1932), born in Ramallah to a Turkish Jewish family. As a schoolboy, Jacob discovered the Siloam inscription.

Spafford died of malaria on September 25, 1888, at age 59. He was buried in Mount Zion Cemetery in Jerusalem.

== It Is Well with My Soul ==
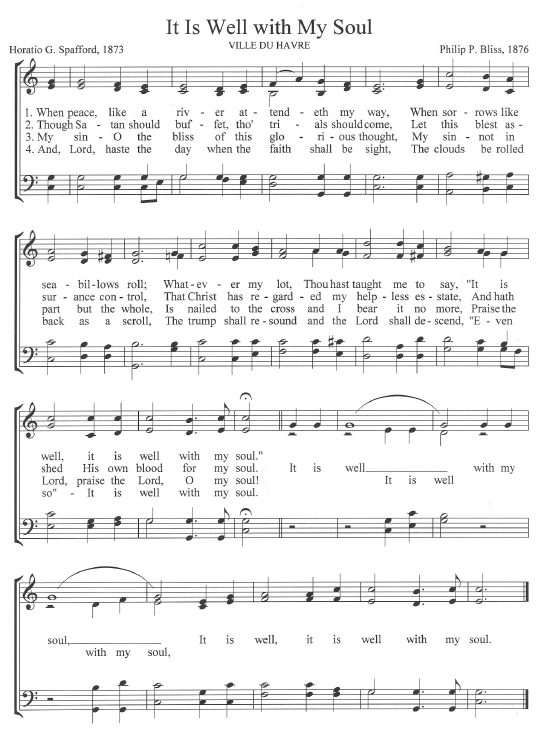
It Is Well With My Soul

The original manuscript has only four verses, but Spafford's daughter, Bertha Spafford Vester (author of Our Jerusalem: An American Family in the Holy City 1881-1949), who was born after the tragedy, said that a verse was later added and the last line of the original song was modified.

The tune, written by Philip Bliss, was named after the ship on which Spafford's daughters died, Ville du Havre. The song is now the subject of a book and a musical. A film project has been announced but not materialized.

When peace, like a river, attendeth my way,
When sorrows like sea billows roll;
Whatever my lot, Thou hast taught me to say,
It is well, it is well with my soul.

(Refrain:) It is well (it is well),
with my soul (with my soul),
It is well, it is well with my soul.

Though Satan should buffet, though trials should come,
Let this blest assurance control,
That Christ hath regarded my helpless estate,
And hath shed His own blood for my soul.
(Refrain)

My sin, oh the bliss of this glorious thought!
My sin, not in part but the whole,
Is nailed to His cross, and I bear it no more,
Praise the Lord, praise the Lord, O my soul!
(Refrain)

For me, be it Christ, be it Christ hence to live:
If Jordan above me shall roll,
No pain shall be mine, for in death as in life
Thou wilt whisper Thy peace to my soul.
(Refrain)

And Lord haste the day, when the faith shall be sight,
The clouds be rolled back as a scroll;
The trump shall resound, and the Lord shall descend,
Even so, it is well with my soul.
(Refrain)

== Commemoration and legacy ==
At the Eastern front during and after World War I, and during the Armenian and Assyrian genocides, the American Colony supported the Muslim, Jewish, and Christian communities of Jerusalem by hosting soup kitchens, hospitals, and orphanages.
