= Sweets (disambiguation) =

Sweets or candy are confections with sugar as the primary ingredient.

Sweets may also refer to:

- Sweets, Cornwall, a hamlet in England, UK
- SweeTs or Eunice Olumide, Scottish fashion model and actress
- Sweets (group), a Japanese girl group
- Sweets (album), a 1956 album by Harry Edison and His Orchestra
  - Harry "Sweets" Edison (1915–1999), American swing trumpeter
- Swetes or Sweet's, Antigua, Antigua and Barbuda

== People with the surname ==
- John F. Sweets (21st century), American historian
- Lance Sweets, a character on Bones

== See also ==
- Sweet (disambiguation)
- Sweetness (disambiguation)
- Suite (disambiguation)
