= Sweetener =

Substance added to food to give it the basic taste of sweetness

A sweetener is a substance added to food or drink to impart the flavor of sweetness, either because it contains a type of sugar, or because it contains a sweet-tasting sugar substitute. Various natural non-sugar sweeteners (NSS) and artificial sweeteners are used to produce food and drink.

== List of sweeteners ==
Many artificial sweeteners have been invented and are now used in commercially produced food and drink. Natural non-sugar sweeteners also exist, such as glycyrrhizin found in liquorice.

- Sugar
  - Sugar alcohol
  - Sucrose, or glucose-fructose, commonly called table sugar
    - Fructose, or fruit sugar
    - Glucose, or dextrose
- Sugar substitute, including artificial sweetener
- Syrups
  - Agave syrup, or agave nectar
  - Maple syrup
  - Corn syrup
    - High-fructose corn syrup (HFCS), used industrially
- Honey
- Molasses
- Dates
- Glycyrrhizin, found in liquorice
- Unrefined sweetener

== See also ==
- Sweet (disambiguation)
- Sweetness (disambiguation)
- Sugar free (disambiguation)
