= Palestine–Taiwan relations =

- Palestine: Taiwan

Diplomatic mission
- None: None

Envoy
- None: None

Palestine–Taiwan relations (Chinese: 中華民國—巴勒斯坦關係; Arabic: العلاقات فلسطين جمهورية الصين) refers to the bilateral relations between Palestine (officially, State of Palestine) and Taiwan (officially, Republic of China). The two countries currently do not have official diplomatic relations, and also do not have diplomatic missions at each other's capitals. Taiwan handles Palestinian affairs through its Economic and Cultural Office in Tel Aviv and in Jordan.

== Diplomatic relations ==
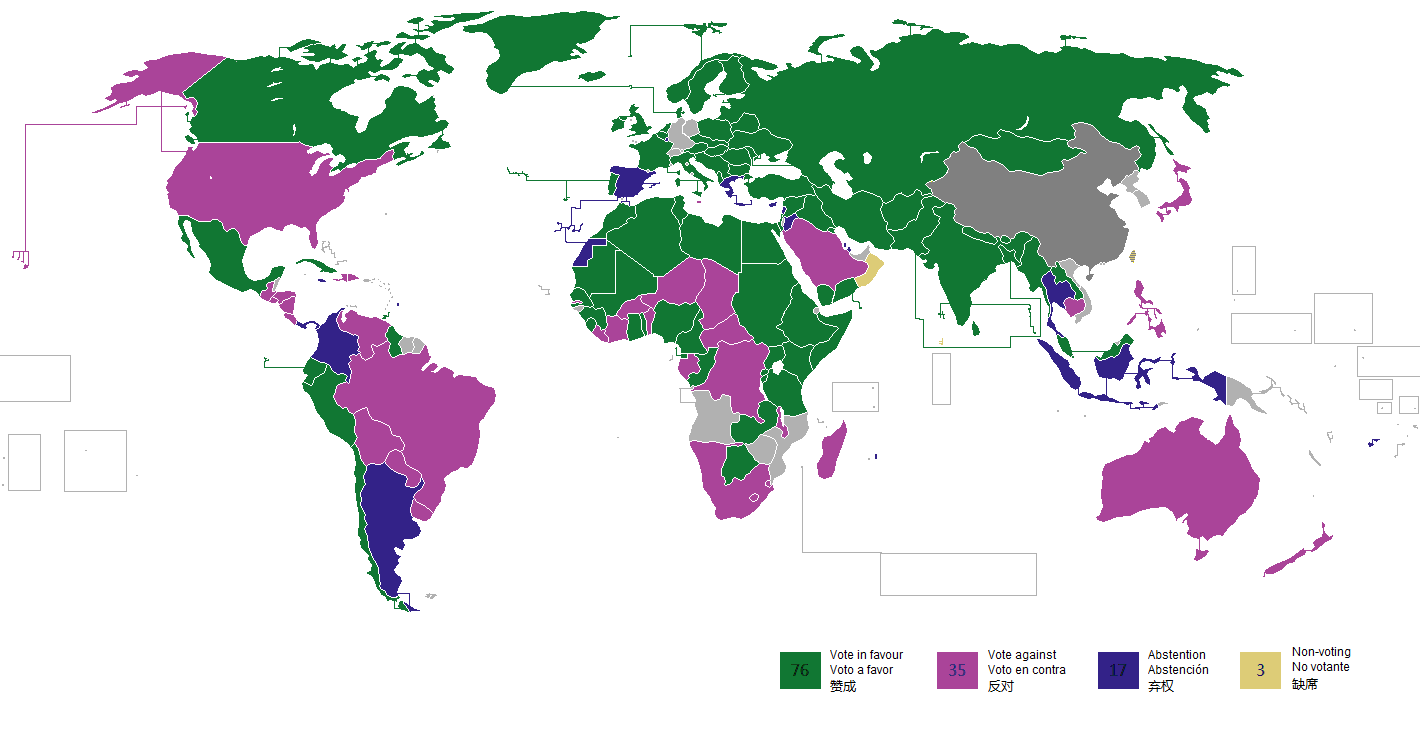
Voting record of the UN during Resolution 2758, which removed the membership of the Republic of China in exchange for the admission of the People's Republic of China. Since Palestine was not yet a member at the time, it did not have a vote on the issue.

On 10 May 1994, Taiwanese president Lee Teng-hui visited then-diplomatic state South Africa to attend the inauguration of newly-elected president Nelson Mandela. During the event, Lee met Palestinian leader Yasser Arafat and the two spoke briefly.

Palestine signed a strategic partnership agreement with China on 14 June 2023, where Palestine affirmed its support for the One China principle with the People's Republic of China as the sole legitimate representative, and that Taiwan is an inseparable part of China, opposing any idea of Taiwanese independence.

Hamas and its allies conducted the October 7 attacks against Israel in 2023, killing over 1,200 Israelis and taking over 250 hostages. Following this, the Taiwanese foreign ministry strongly condemned the attack.

On 21 September 2025, the Palestinian Ambassador to the United Nations shared a post on Twitter (or X) involving a world map of the International recognition of Palestine. The map classified Taiwan as "states that have recognized State of Palestine or expressed their intention to do so", and did not differentiate between the Chinese and Taiwanese positions. In response, the Taiwanese foreign ministry criticized this post for disrespecting Taiwanese sovereignty, and reiterated that the Taiwanese government does not have plans to recognize Palestine at the moment. The ministry also called on Palestine to friendly interact with Taiwan on a basis of mutual respect.

== Trade relations ==
Recent bilateral trade volume (in USD)
Year	Trade volume			Taiwan→Palestine			Palestine→Taiwan		
Year	Amount	Annual change	Ranking	Amount	Annual change	ranking	Amount	Annual change	Ranking
2017	371,900	▼52.9%	202	368,626	▼53.2%	195	3,274	▲232.0%	220
2018	734,318	▲97.5%	195	721,967	▲95.9%	185	12,351	▲277.2%	215
2019	676,995	▼7.8%	196	676,995	▼6.2%	182	--	--	236
2020	1,269,690	▲87.5%	184	1,257,295	▲85.7%	169	12,395	--	205
2021	2,479,727	▲95.3%	180	2,478,063	▲97.1%	163	1,664	▼86.6%	228
2022	5,191,007	▲109.3%	166	5,190,913	▲109.5%	149	94	▼94.4%	242
2023	4,821,816	▼7.1%	165	4,820,183	▼7.1%	148	1,633	▲1,637.2%	218
2024	2,998,653	▼37.8%	175	2,998,653	▼37.8%	156	--	--	245

In 2023, the main trade products are as follows:

Taiwanese exports to Palestine: telephones (including smartphones), other devices that transmit sound or images, wireless network devices, furniture, water (including mineral water, soft drinks and carbonated water), other drinks that include sugar or sweeteners but are non-alcoholic; wrenches and pliers, interchangeable wrench sockets (with or without handles), hand tools, blowtorches, Lineman's pliers, tongs, cutting boards, portable forges, grinding wheels, Pneumatic, hydraulic, electric and non-electric motors, files, tweezers, scissors, pipecutters, bolt cutters, retail tools made of two or more parts, and other miscellaneous items valued at less than $50,000 NTD.

Palestinian exports to Taiwan: synthetic or reconstructed gemstones, special products, other miscellaneous items valued at less than $50,000 NTD.

== Humanitarian aid and civil society ==
Taiwan's Ministry of Foreign Affairs (MOFA) distributes humanitarian aid to the population in the Gaza Strip through the Taipei Economic and Cultural Office in Jordan and Mercy Corps. In May 2024, the Taiwanese government donated $500,000 USD to Mercy Corps as funds for distributing humanitarian supplies to Gazan civilians, such as food, drinking water, clothing, and tents.

In 2024 October 7, the Taiwan Alliance for a Free Palestine group held a demonstration outside the Israeli representative office in Taiwan. Others groups have participated in demonstrations as well.

In April 2025, the political parties Taiwan Obasang Political Equality Party and Green Party Taiwan, alongside civil society organisations including Taiwan International Workers Association and the Indonesian migrant workers' Serikat Buruh Industri Perawatan Taiwan association, presented a list of demands to MOFA to end the genocide.

On 15 September 2025, the Taipei Economic and Cultural Office in Tel Aviv collaborated with the charity Save a Child's Heart to establish a program to help Palestinian children with heart disease and to provide training for Palestinian medical staff. The first phase saw 10 Palestinian children from the West Bank receive treatment in a children's hospital in Israel, along with the training of Palestinian doctors.

== Cultural relations ==
The Taiwan International Documentary Festival 2026 organised by national film archive Taiwan Film and Audiovisual Institute featured 14 films on Palestinian history, including films by Palestinian filmmakers Mohanad Yaqubi, (Note: Director of Life Is Beautiful (2023 film).) Kamal Aljafari and Azza El-Hassan.

== See also ==
- Palestine and the United Nations
- Taiwan and the United Nations
- List of states with limited recognition
- List of diplomatic missions of Taiwan
- List of diplomatic missions in Taiwan
- List of diplomatic missions of Palestine
- List of diplomatic missions in Palestine
