= List of diplomatic missions in Israel =

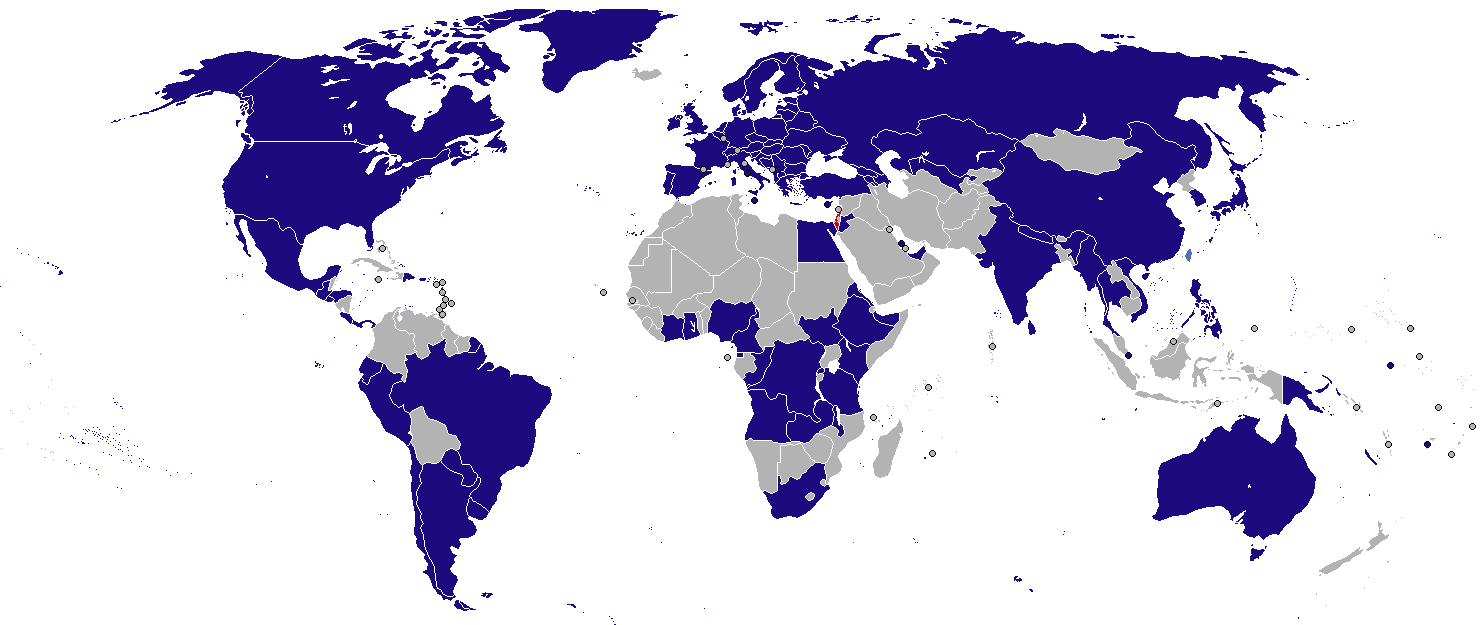
Map of nations with diplomatic missions in Israel

Diplomatic missions in Israel are foreign embassies and consulates in Israel. As of 14 October 2026, there are 99 embassies in Israel, of which 89 are located in the Tel Aviv District and 10 are located in Jerusalem. In addition to their embassy, some countries also maintain a consulate in Eilat, Haifa or Jerusalem.

On 6 December 2017 the President of the United States, Donald Trump announced that the US embassy to Israel would be moved to Jerusalem. The move was made on 14 May 2018. In April 2018, Guatemala announced that their embassy would move to Jerusalem, which it did the following month. Kosovo and Honduras followed in 2021. Paraguay's embassy was briefly located in Jerusalem in 2018, then returned to the Tel Aviv District after a few months. Papua New Guinea followed in 2023. Paraguay returned its embassy to Jerusalem in December 2024. In June 2026, Somaliland opened its embassy in Jerusalem. In October 2026, Colombia moved its embassy from Tel Aviv to Jerusalem.

In 2025, the President of Argentina, Javier Milei, announced his intention to move the Argentine embassy in Israel from Tel Aviv to Jerusalem. This move would make Argentina the second South American country to relocate its embassy to Jerusalem, aligning with similar actions taken by countries such as the United States. The decision was seen as symbolically significant, particularly given the presence of a large and influential Jewish community in Argentina, one of the most prominent in Latin America.

Eight countries operate consulates-general in Jerusalem accredited to the Palestinian territories. These are not diplomatic missions to Israel, but rather to Palestine.

== Embassies ==
=== Jerusalem ===
1. Colombia
2. Fiji
3. Guatemala
4. Honduras
5. Kosovo
6. Nauru
7. Papua New Guinea
8. Paraguay
9. Somaliland
10. United States

=== Tel Aviv ===
1. Albania (Ramat Gan)
2. Angola
3. Argentina
4. Armenia
5. Australia
6. Austria (Ramat Gan)
7. Azerbaijan
8. Bahrain
9. Belarus
10. Belgium (Ramat Gan)
11. Bosnia and Herzegovina
12. Brazil
13. Bulgaria
14. Cameroon (Ramat Gan)
15. Canada
16. Chile
17. China
18. Congo-Brazzaville (Herzliya)
19. Congo-Kinshasa
20. Costa Rica (Ramat Gan)
21. Croatia
22. Cyprus
23. Czech Republic
24. Denmark
25. Dominican Republic
26. Ecuador
27. Egypt
28. El Salvador (Herzliya)
29. Equatorial Guinea (Herzliya)
30. Eritrea
31. Estonia
32. Ethiopia
33. Finland
34. France
35. Georgia (Ramat Gan)
36. Germany
37. Ghana (Herzliya)
38. Greece
39. Holy See
40. Hungary
41. India
42. Ireland (Ramat Gan)
43. Italy
44. Ivory Coast
45. Japan
46. Jordan (Herzliya)
47. Kazakhstan
48. Kenya (Ramat Gan)
49. Latvia
50. Lithuania (Ramat Gan)
51. Malawi
52. Malta
53. Mexico
54. Moldova
55. Myanmar
56. Nepal
57. Netherlands (Ramat Gan)
58. Nigeria
59. North Macedonia (Ramat Gan)
60. Norway
61. Panama
62. Peru (Herzliya)
63. Philippines
64. Poland
65. Portugal
66. Romania
67. Russia
68. Rwanda (Herzliya)
69. Serbia
70. Singapore
71. Slovakia
72. Slovenia
73. South Africa (Ramat Gan)
74. South Korea (Herzliya)
75. South Sudan (Herzliya)
76. Spain
77. Sri Lanka
78. Sweden
79. Switzerland
80. Tanzania (Ramat Gan)
81. Thailand (Herzliya)
82. Turkey
83. Ukraine
84. United Arab Emirates
85. United Kingdom
86. Uruguay (Herzliya)
87. Uzbekistan (Ramat Gan)
88. Vietnam
89. Zambia

=== Other missions and delegations ===
- Morocco (Liaison Office)
- Republic of China (Taiwan) (Economic and Cultural Office)
- European Union (Delegation)
- Bavaria (Representative office)
- North Rhine-Westphalia (Representative office)
- Baden-Württemberg (Economic office)
- Faroe Islands (Representative Office)
- Québec (Bureau)
- United Nations (UNHCR Representative)
- ICRC (Delegation)
- International Christian Embassy Jerusalem
- Indigenous Embassy, Jerusalem

== Gallery ==
=== Jerusalem ===
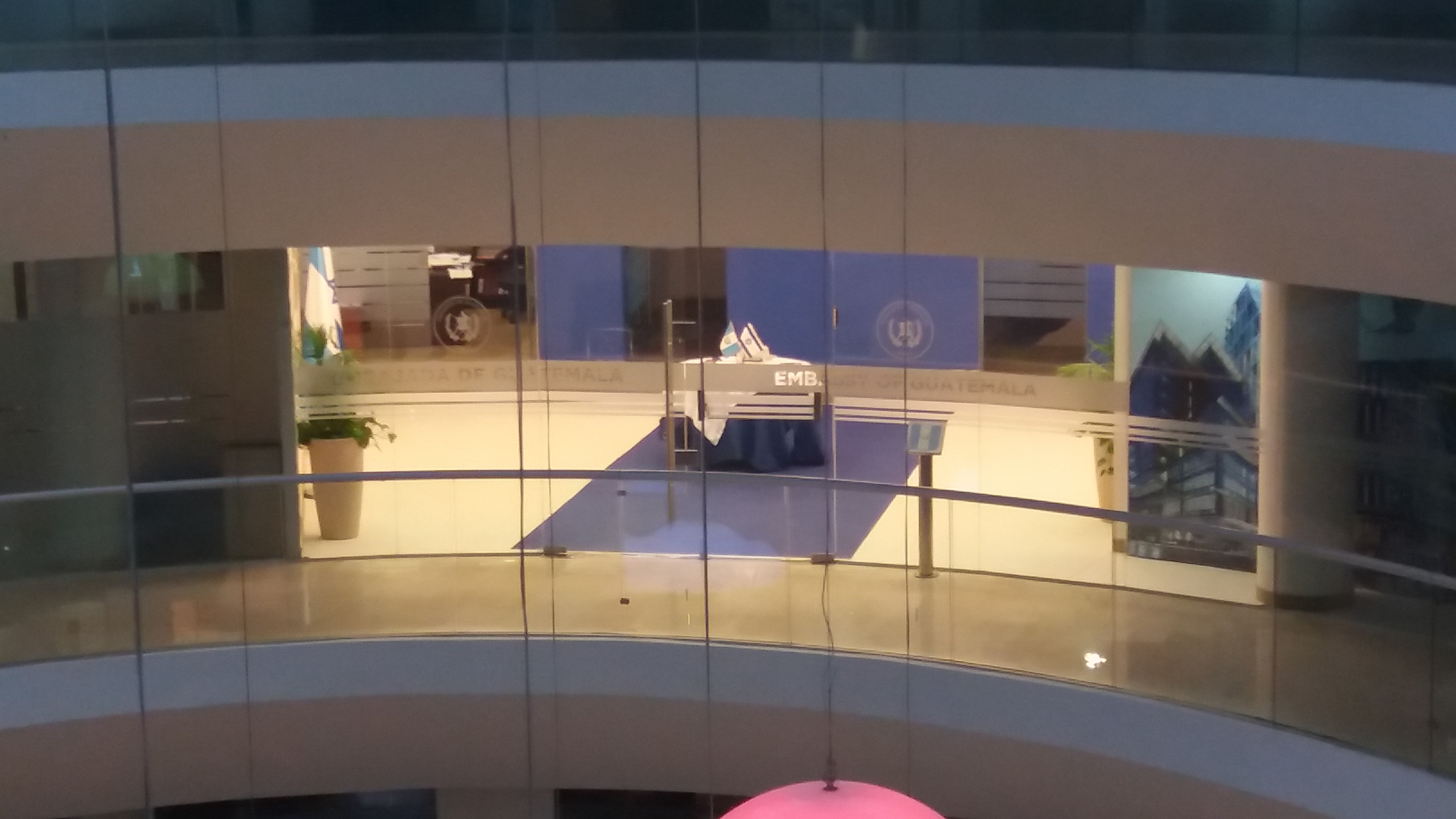
Embassy of Guatemala

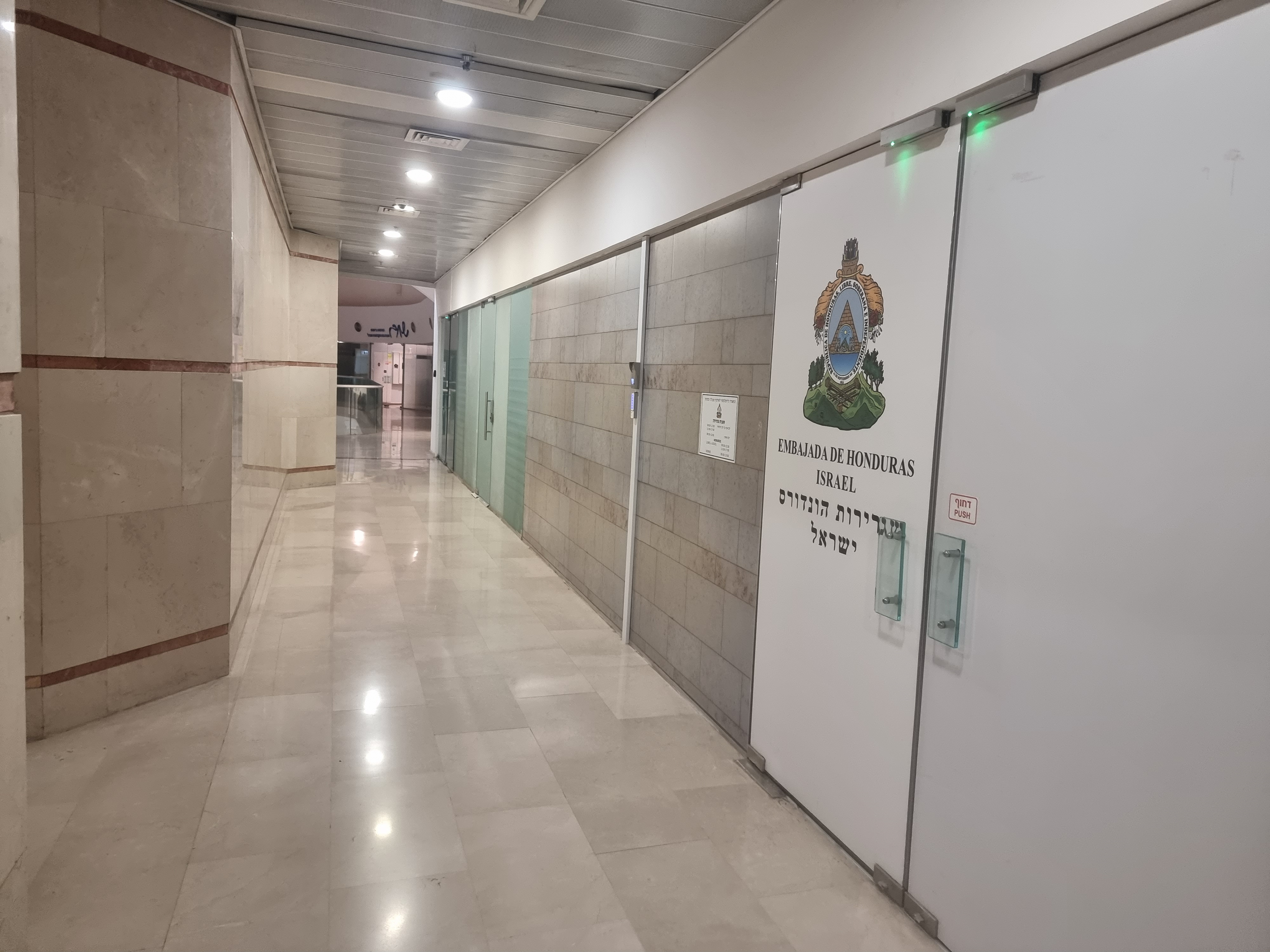
Embassy of Honduras

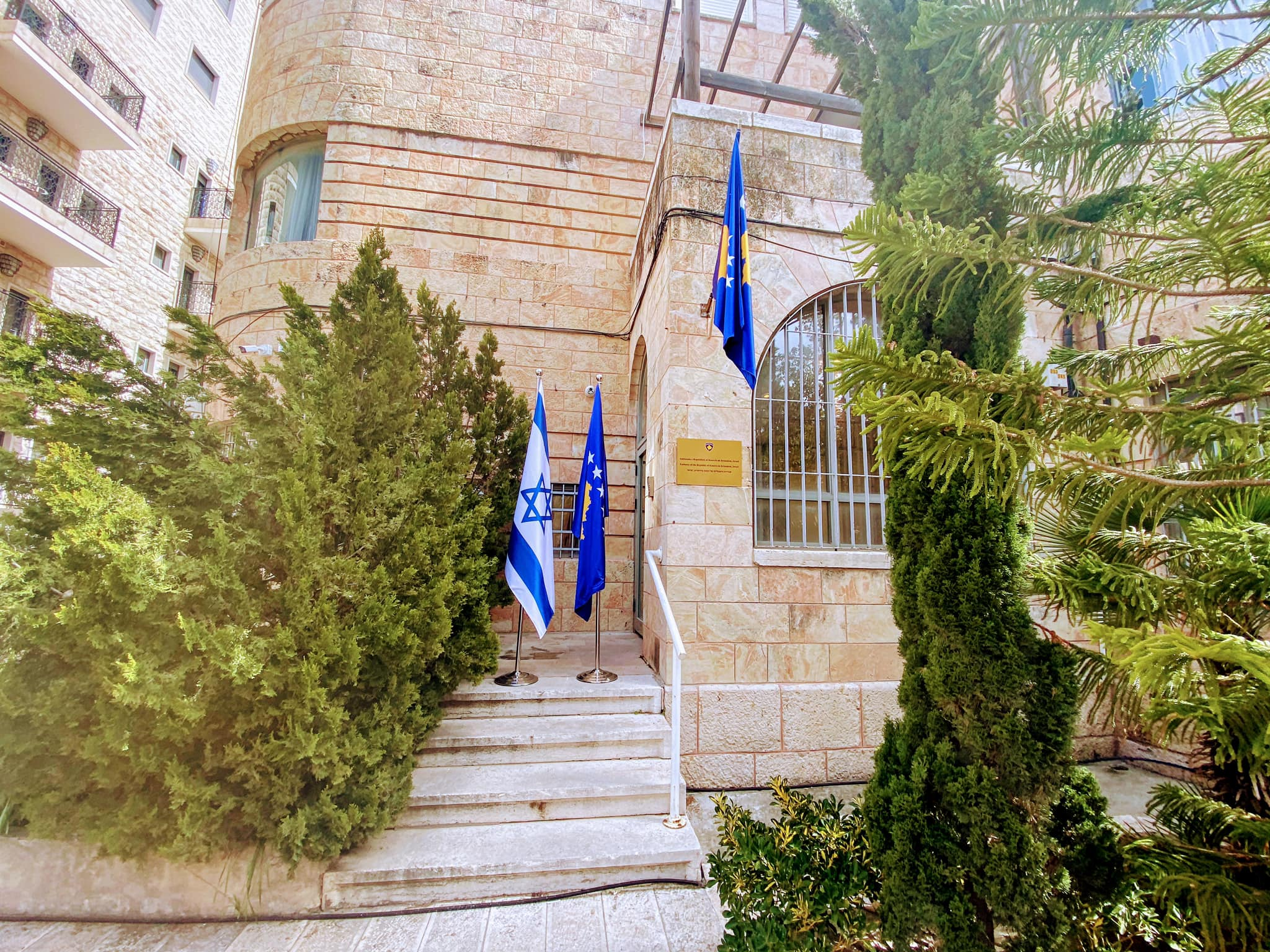
Embassy of Kosovo

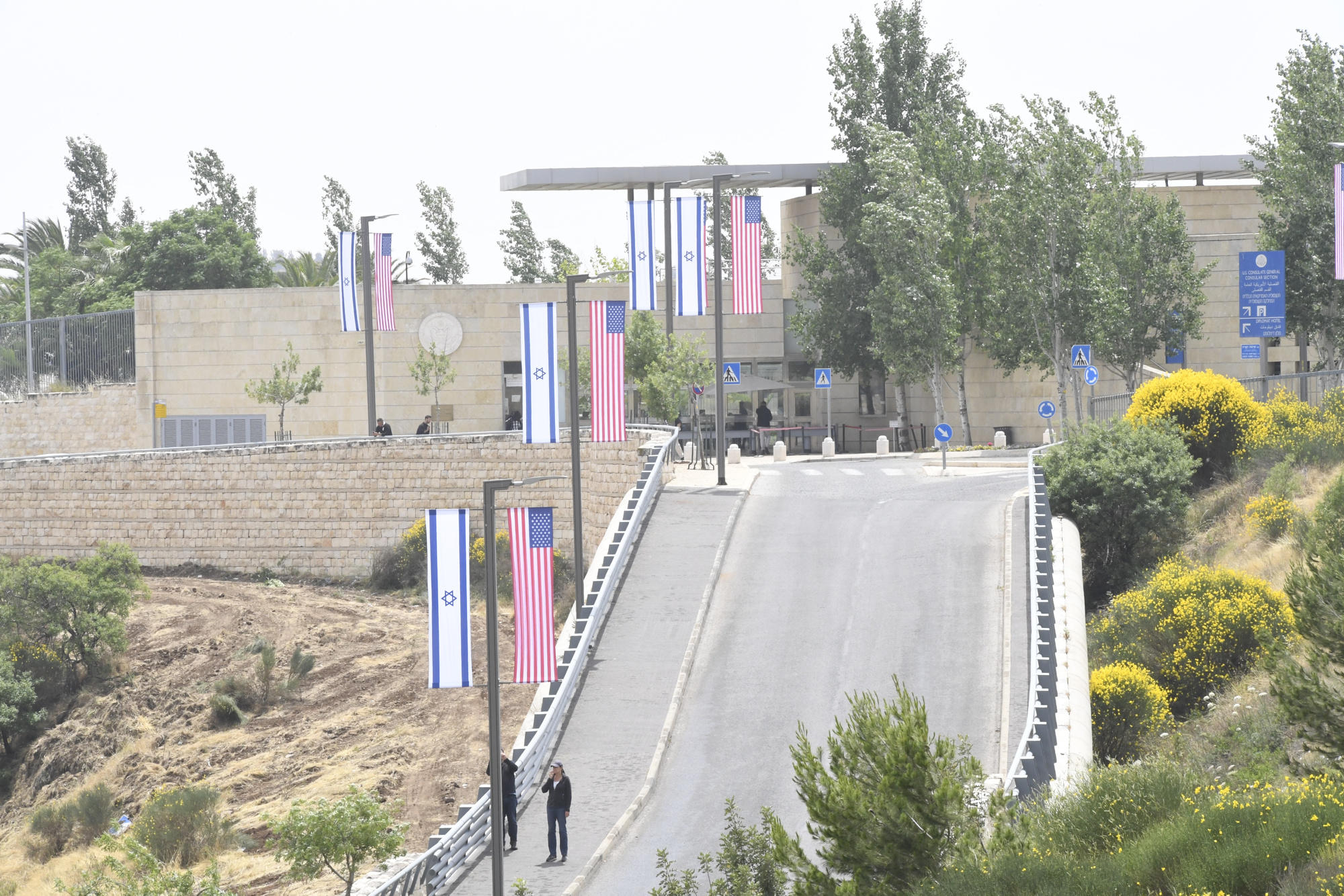
Embassy of the United States

=== Tel Aviv ===
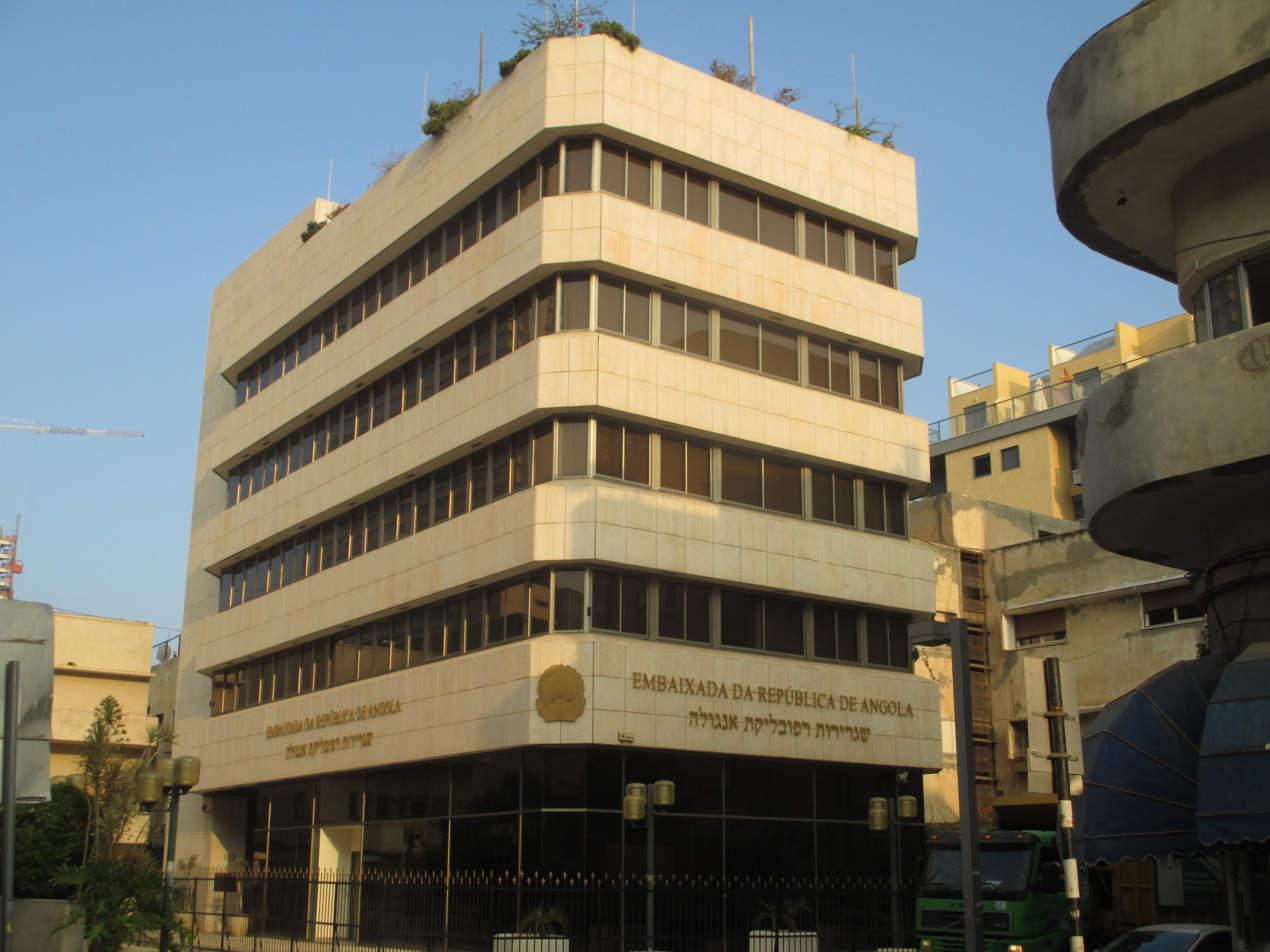
Embassy of Angola

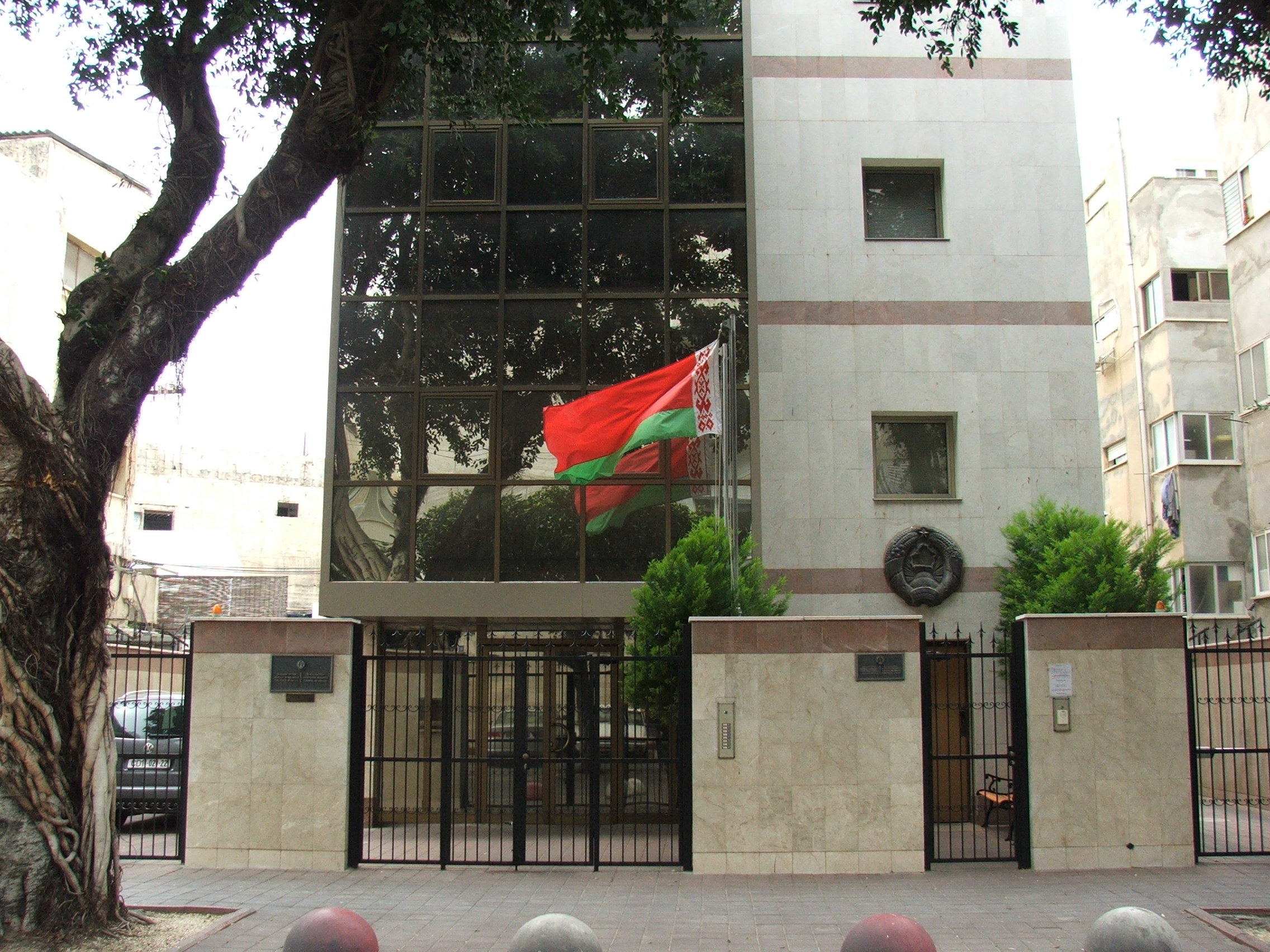
Embassy of Belarus

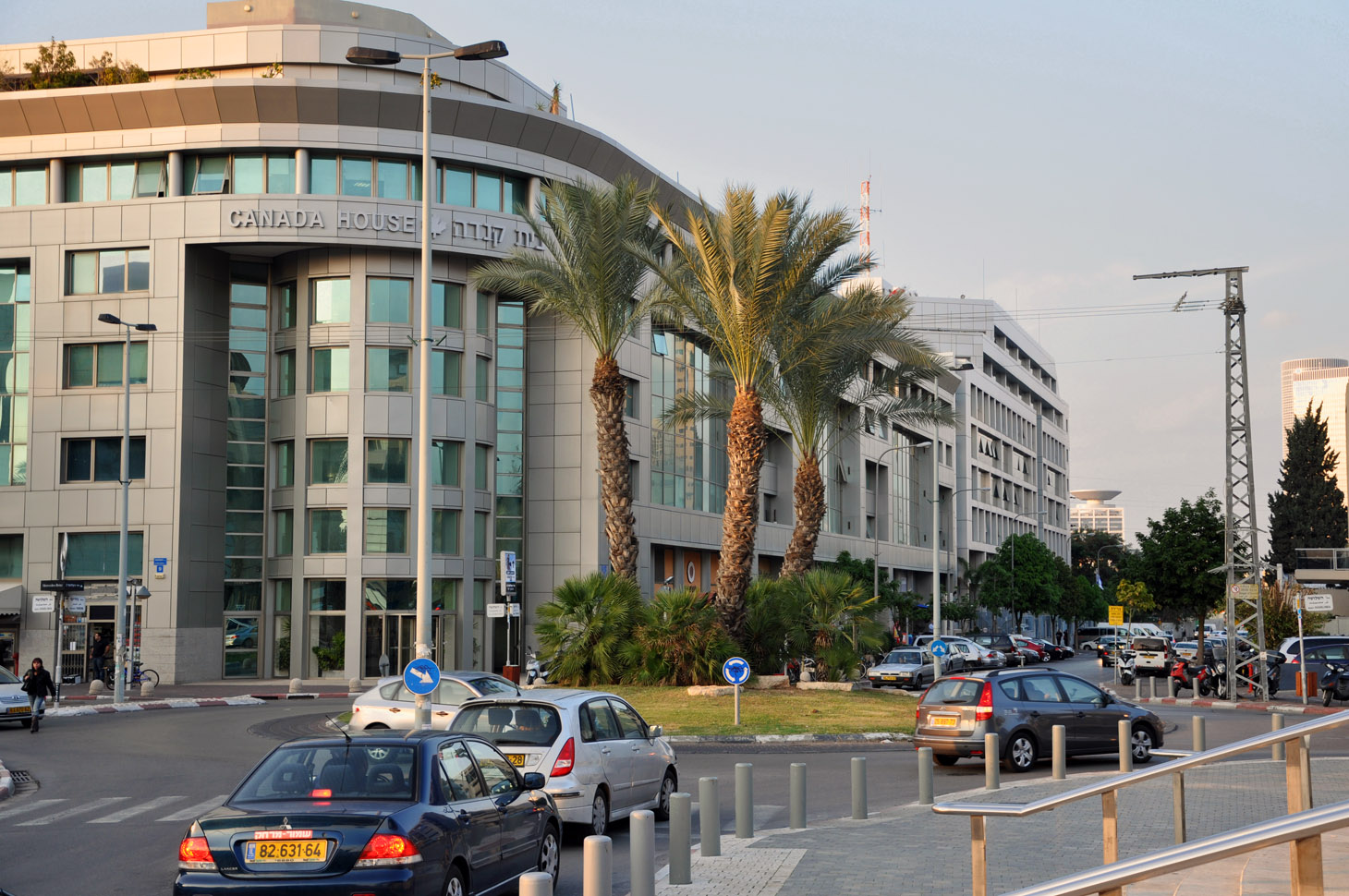
Building hosting the Embassy of Canada

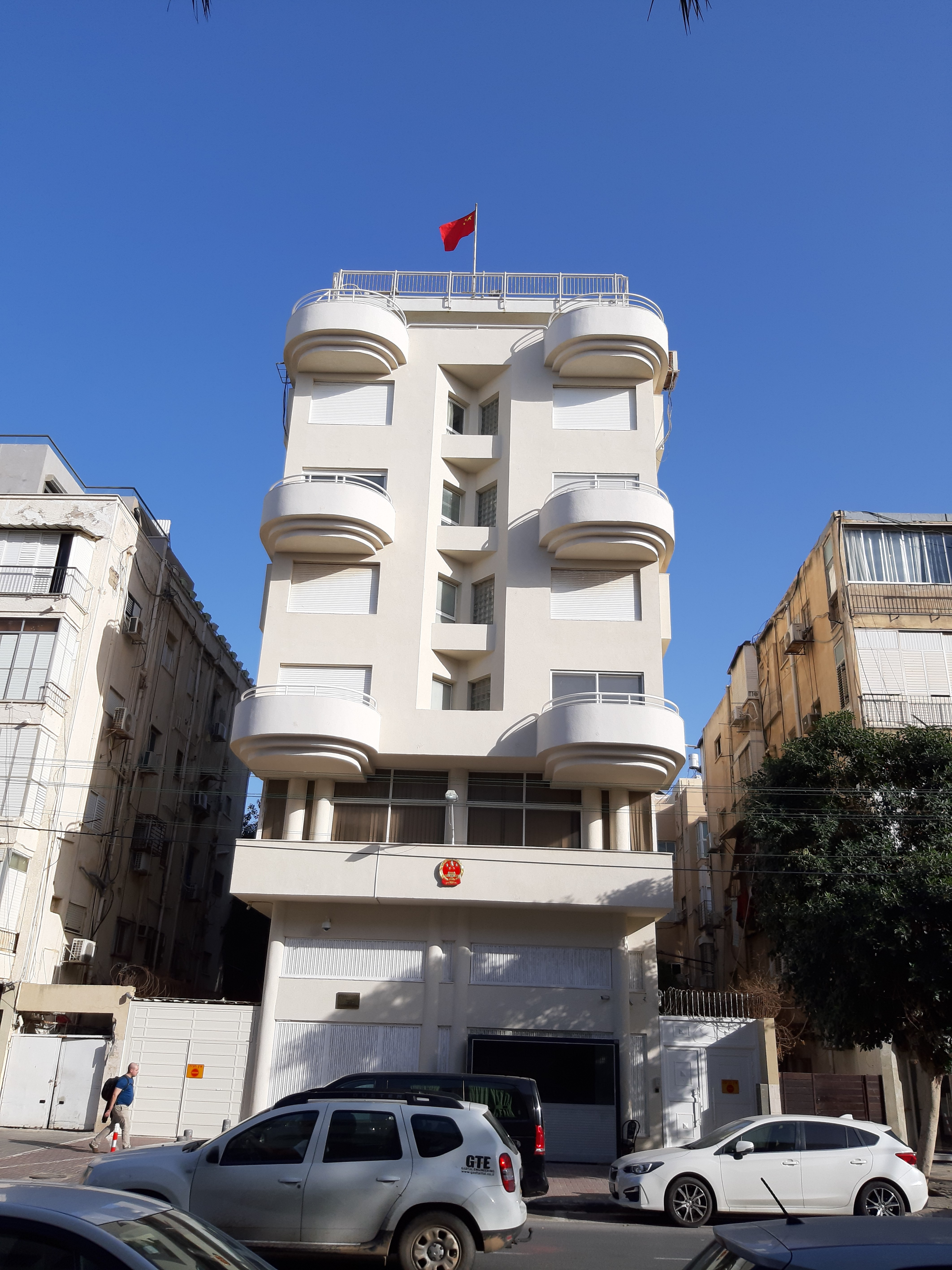
Embassy of China

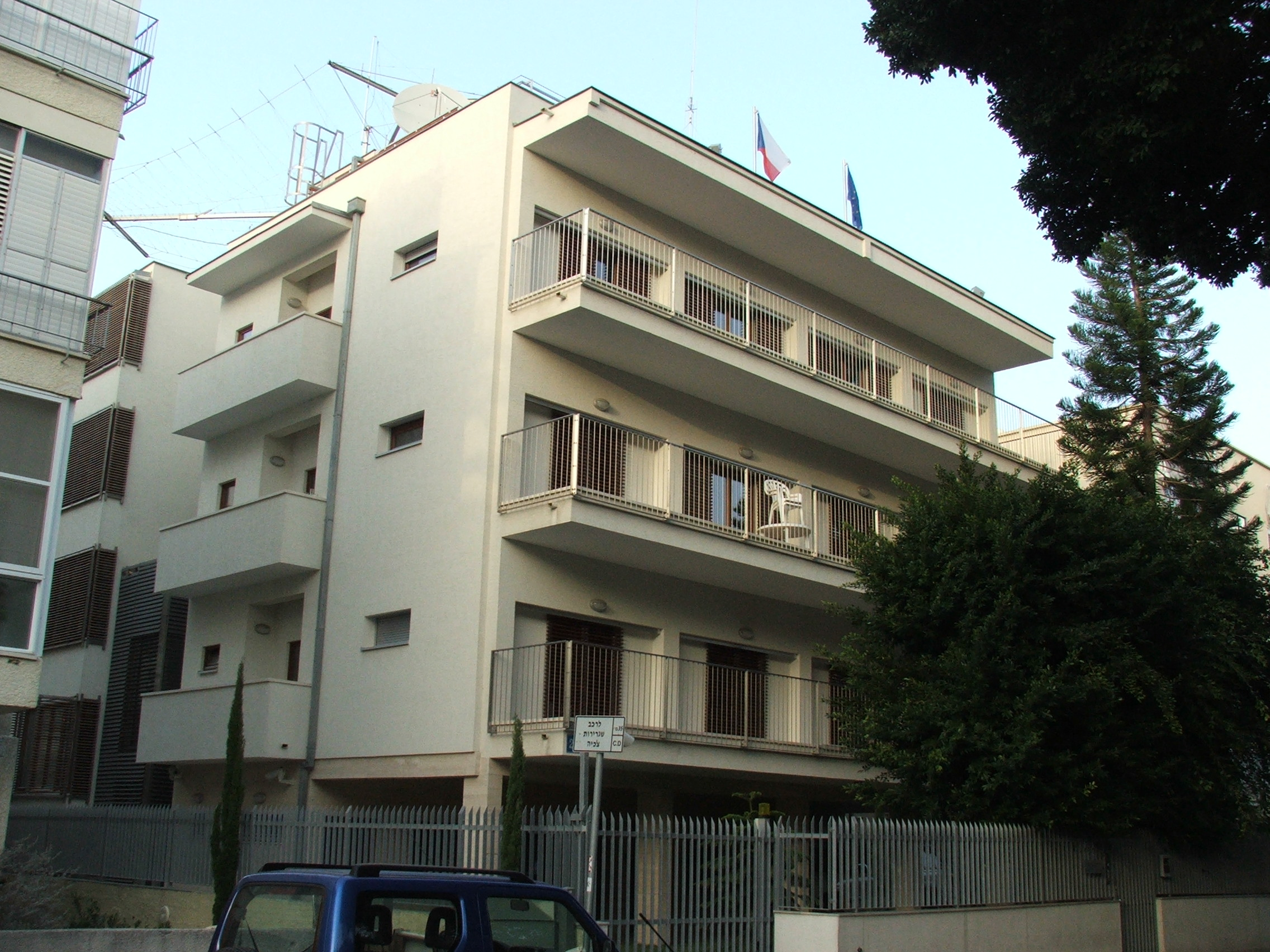
Embassy of Czechia

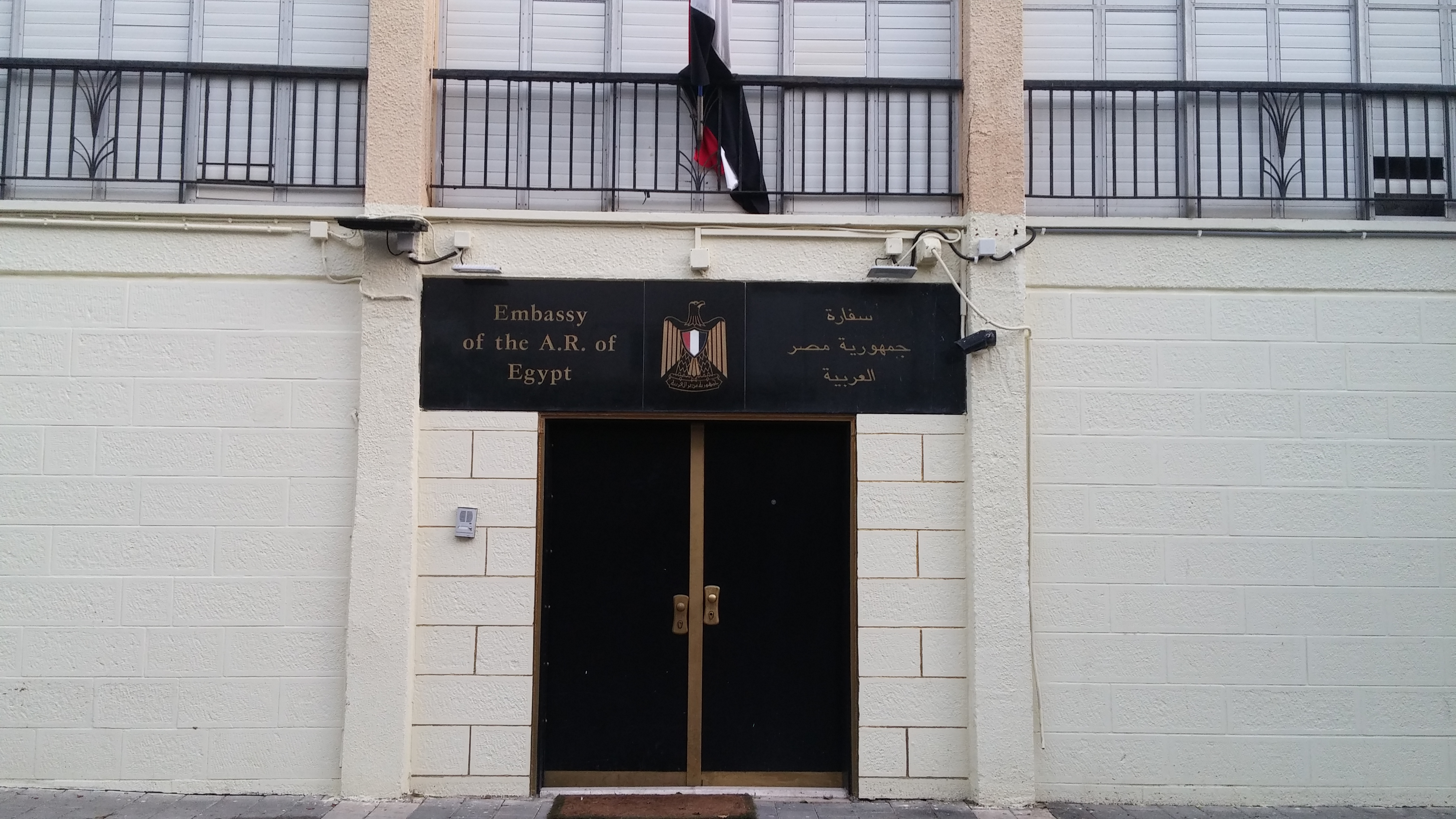
Embassy of Egypt

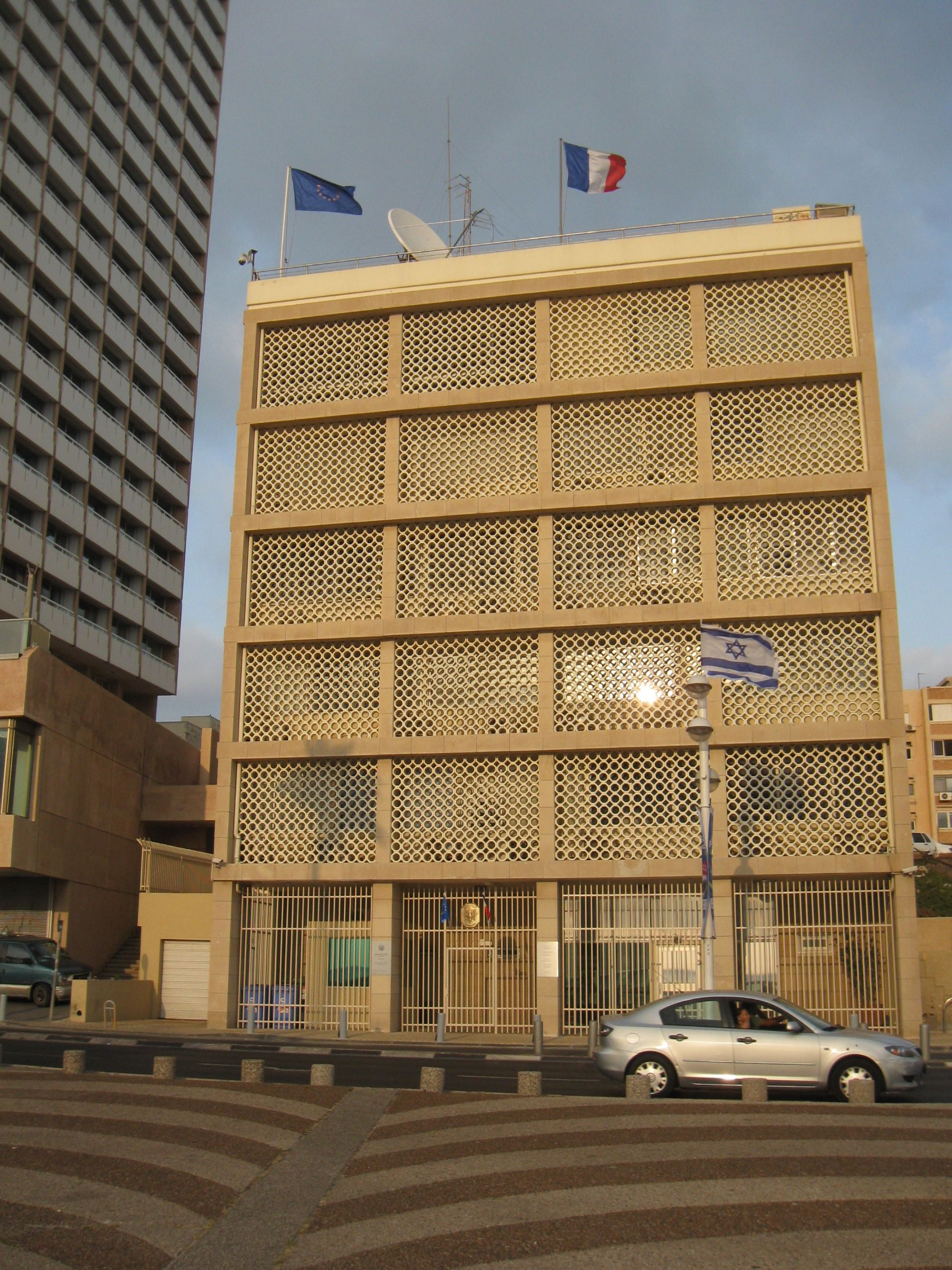
Embassy of France

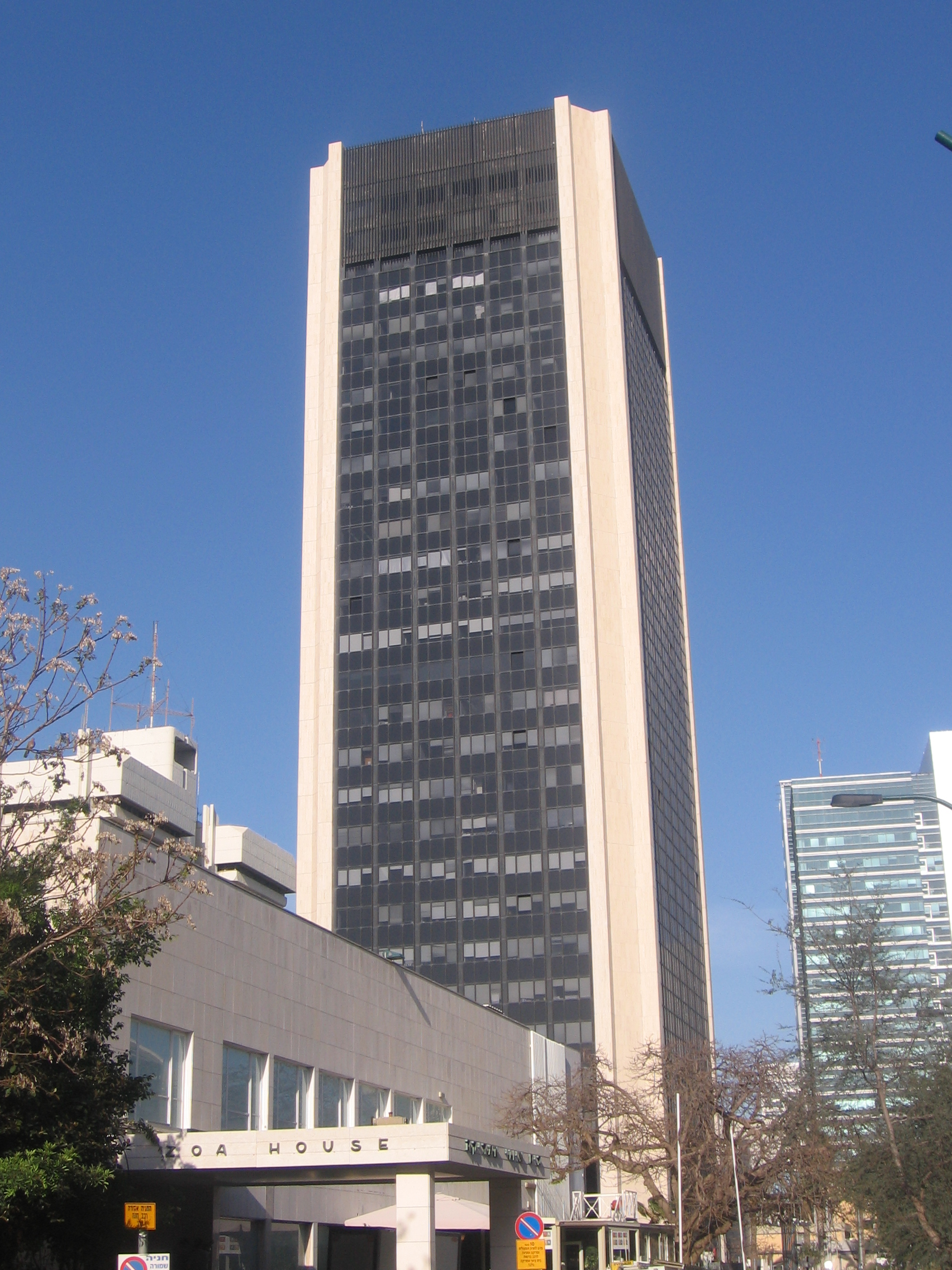
Building hosting the Embassies of Georgia, Germany, Greece, and Spain

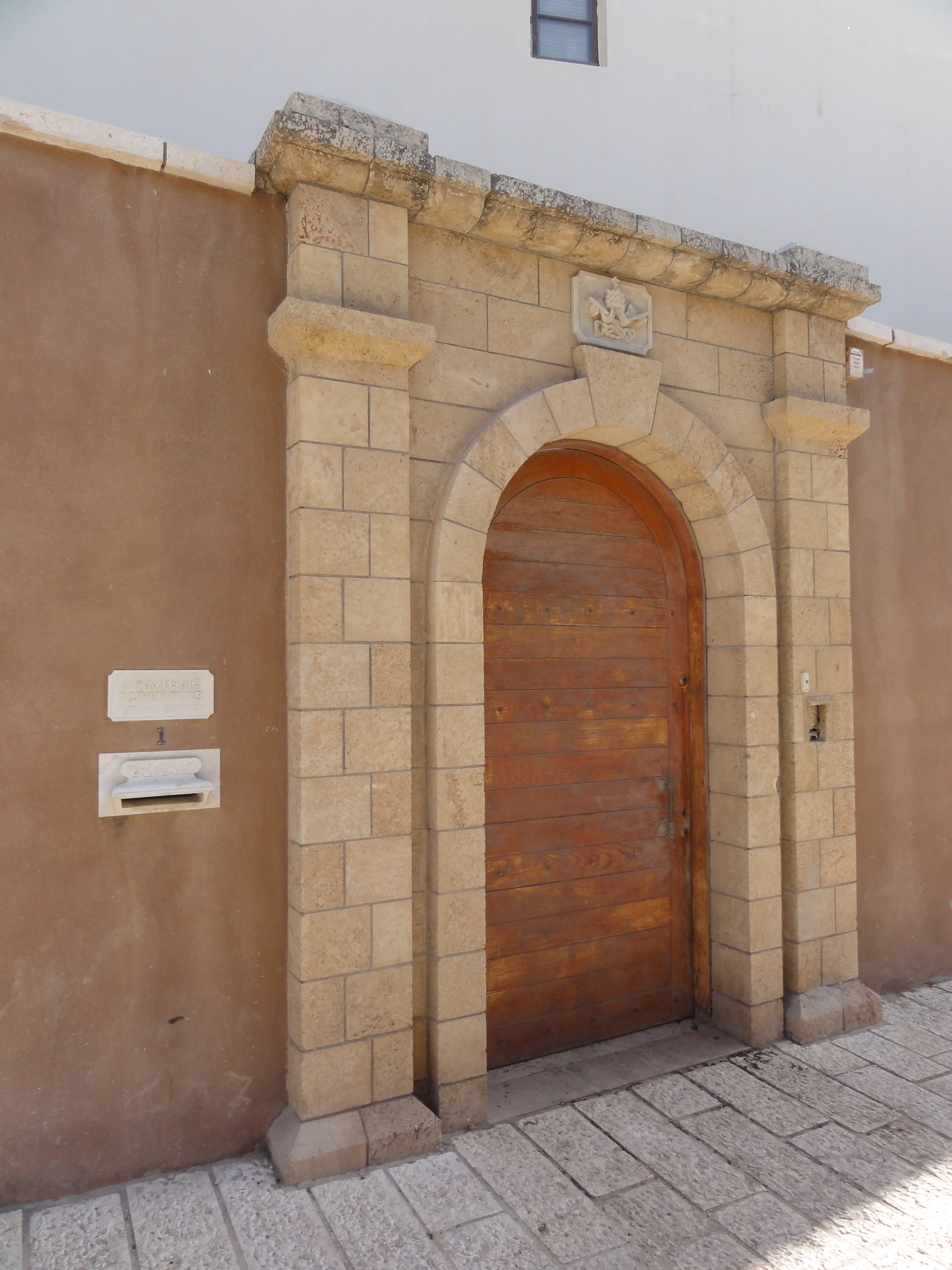
Apostolic Nunciature (Holy See)

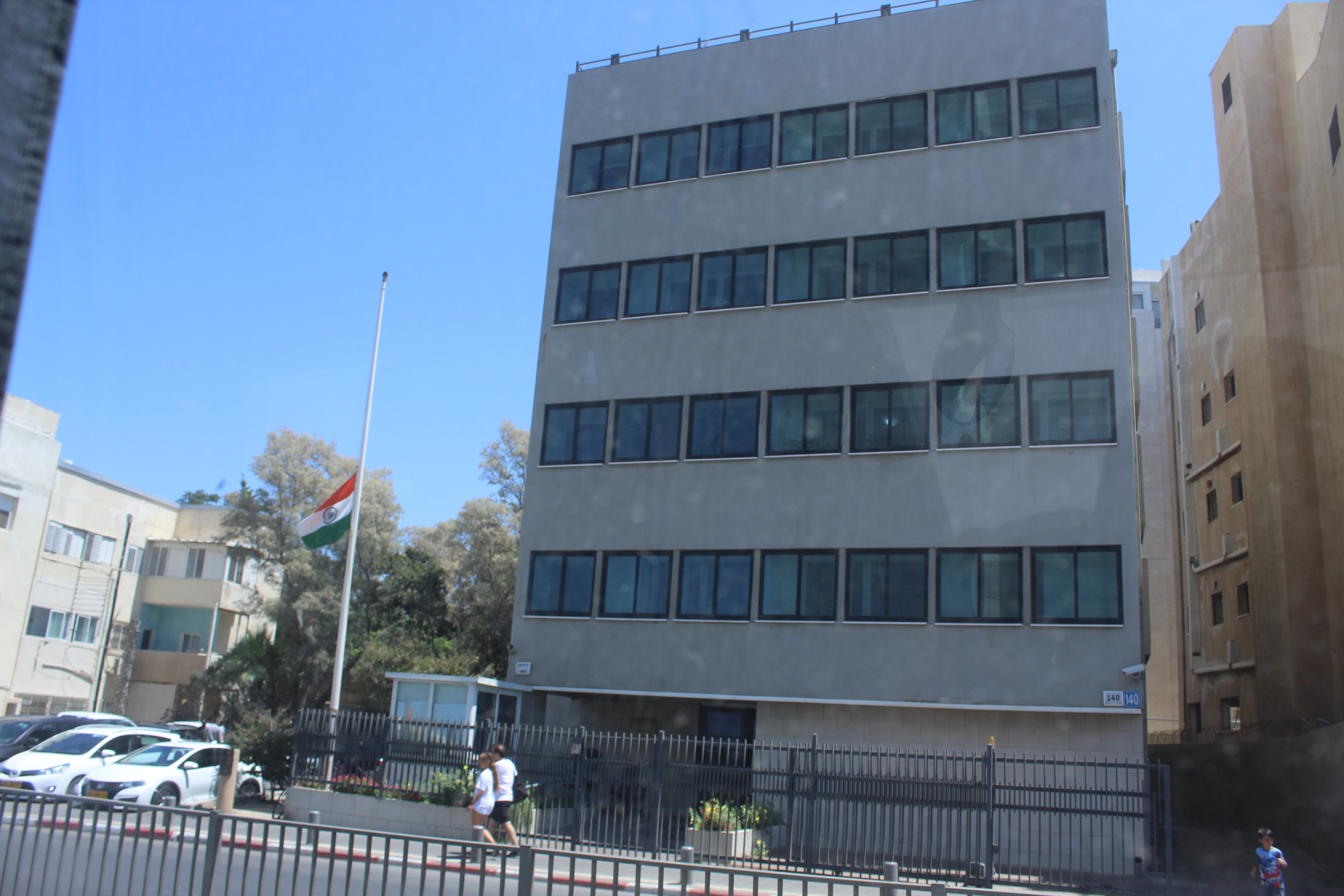
Embassy of India

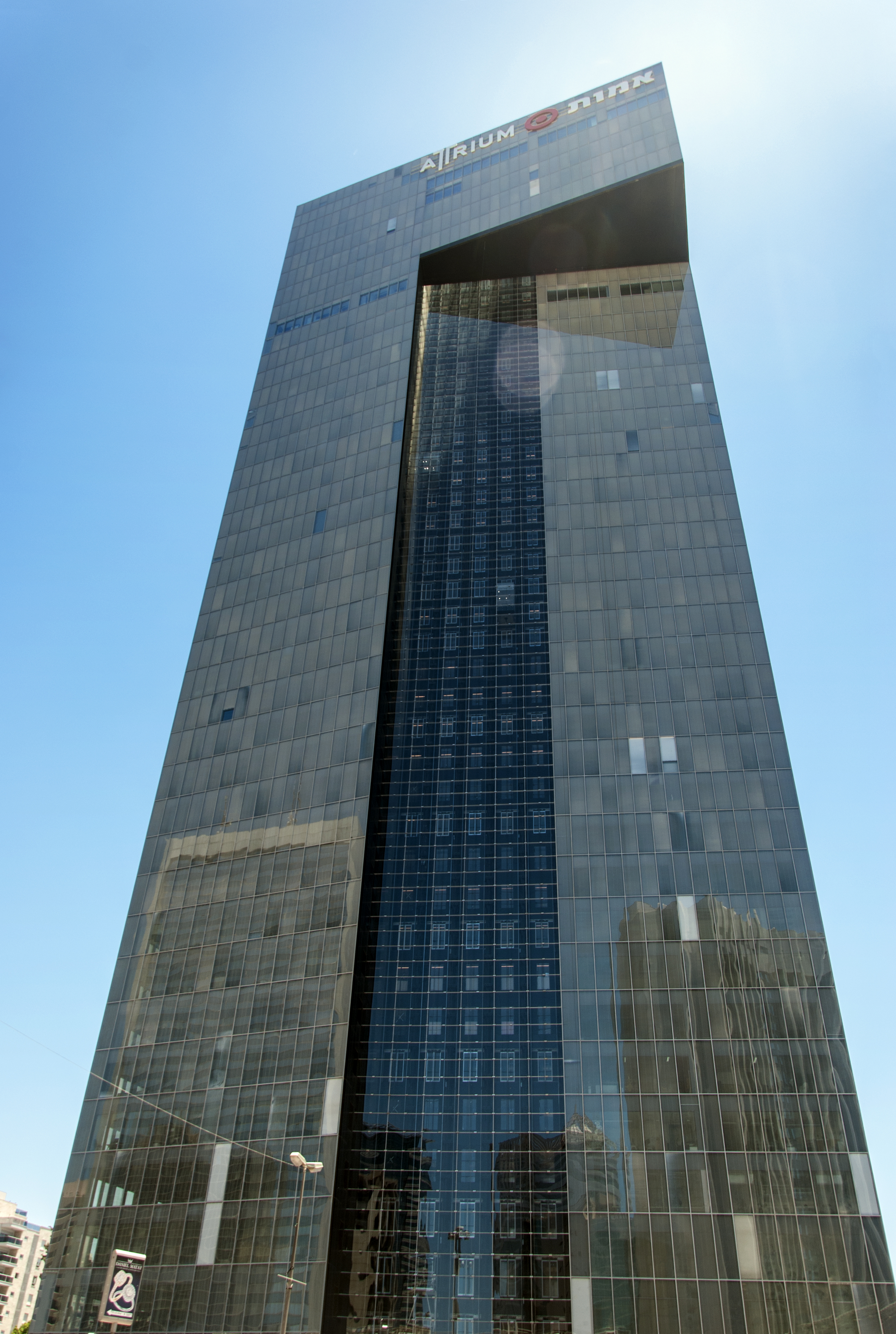
Building Hosting Embassy of Ireland

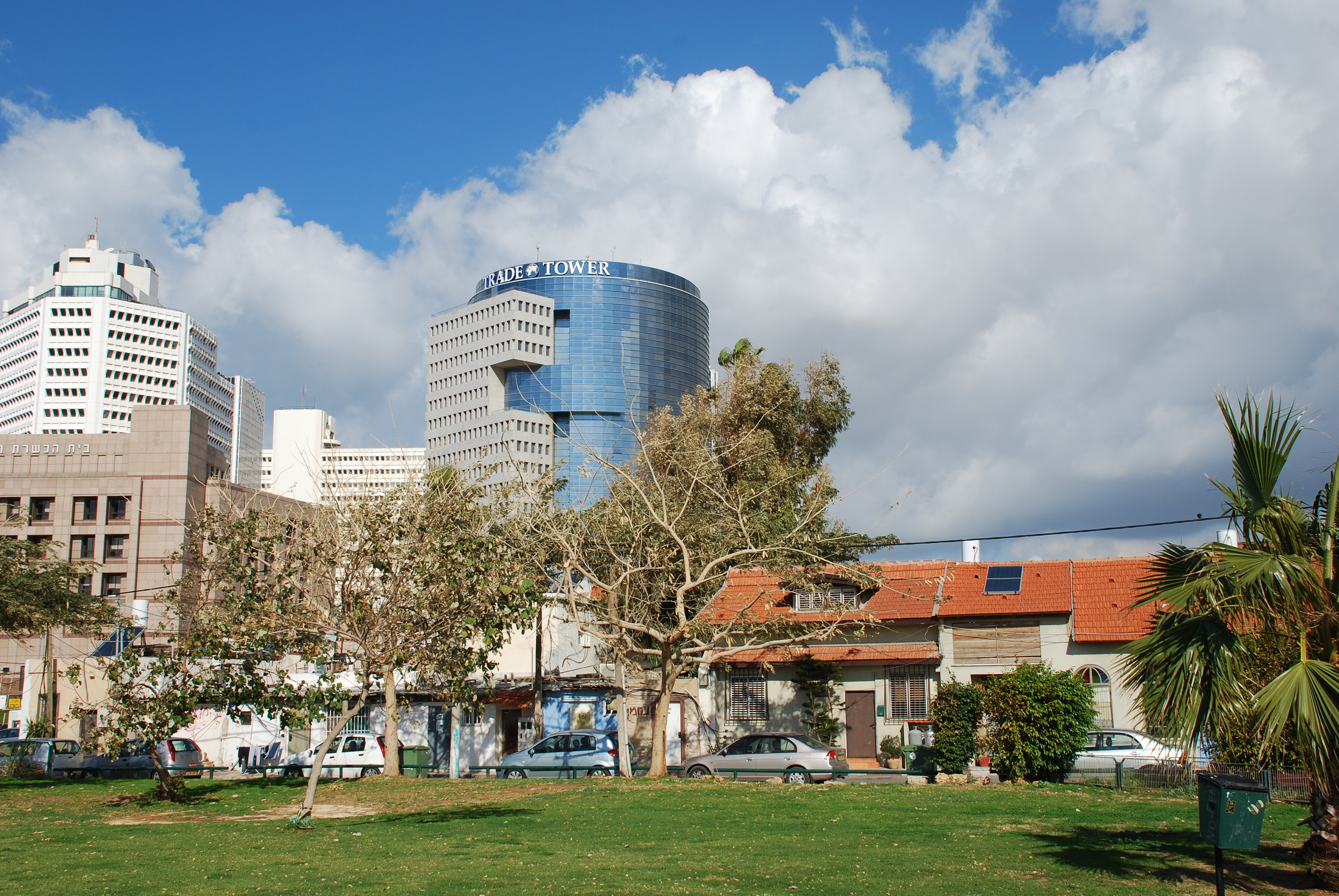
Building hosting the Embassies of Italy and Mexico

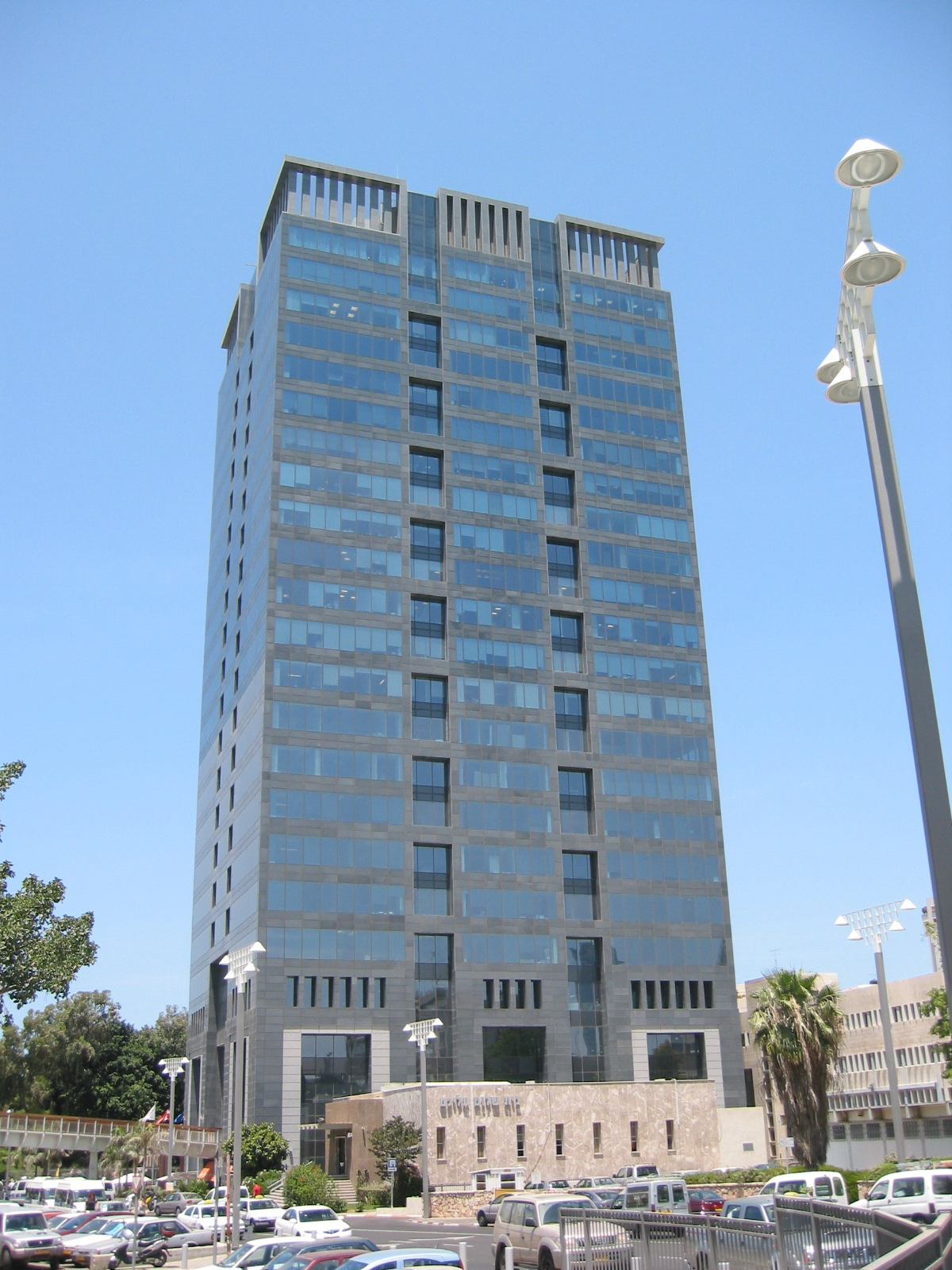
Building hosting the Embassy of Japan

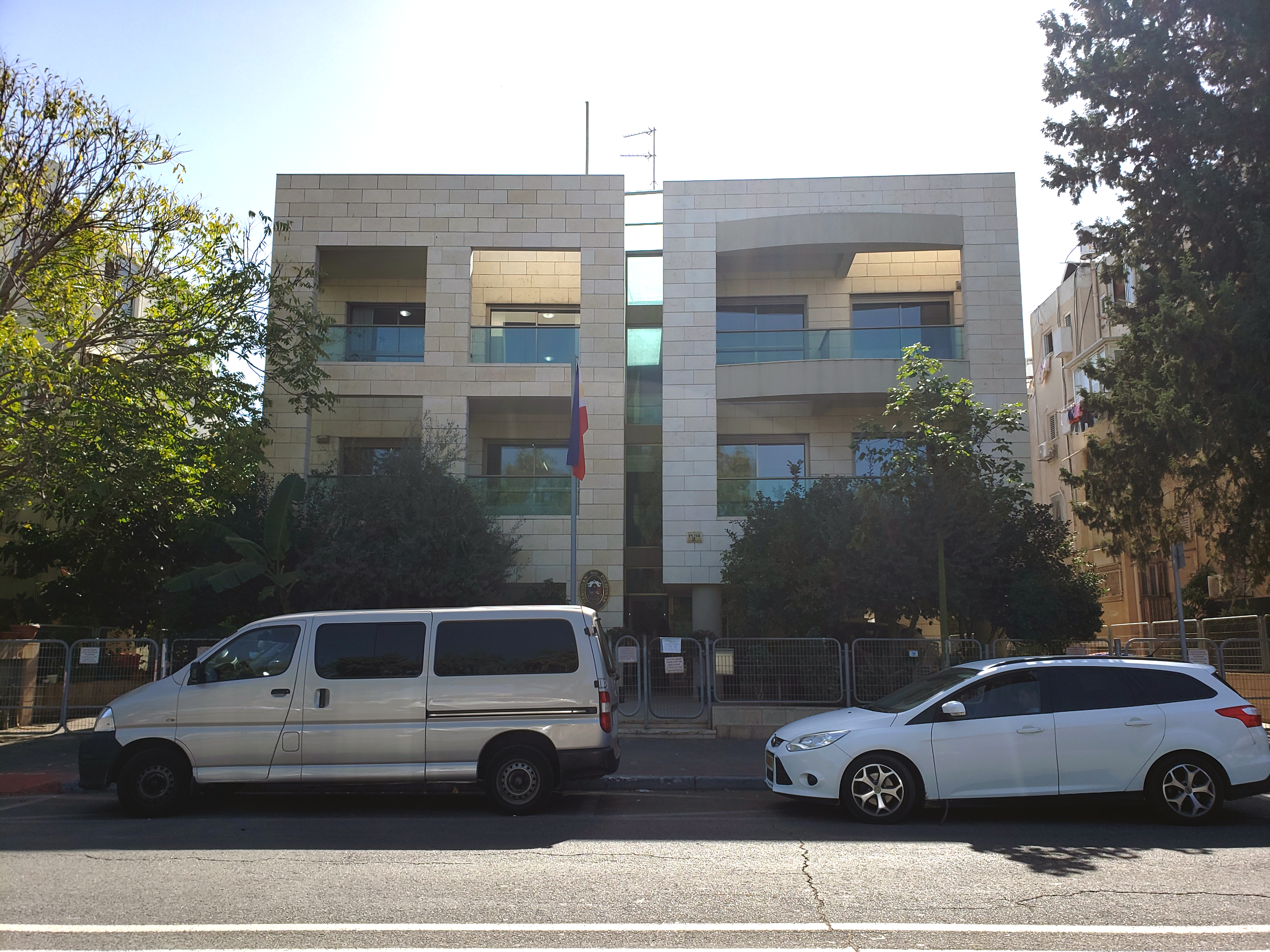
Embassy of the Philippines

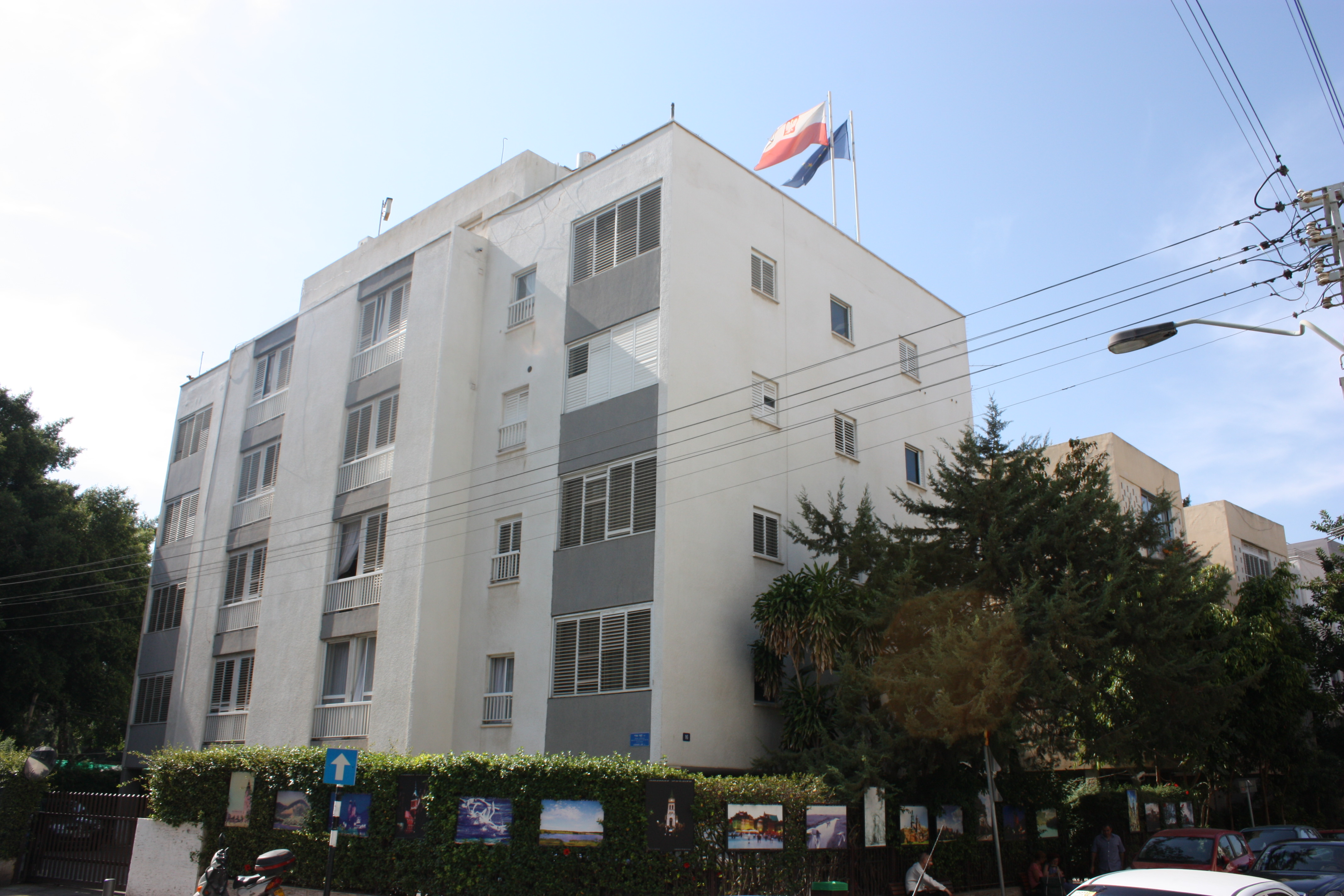
Embassy of Poland

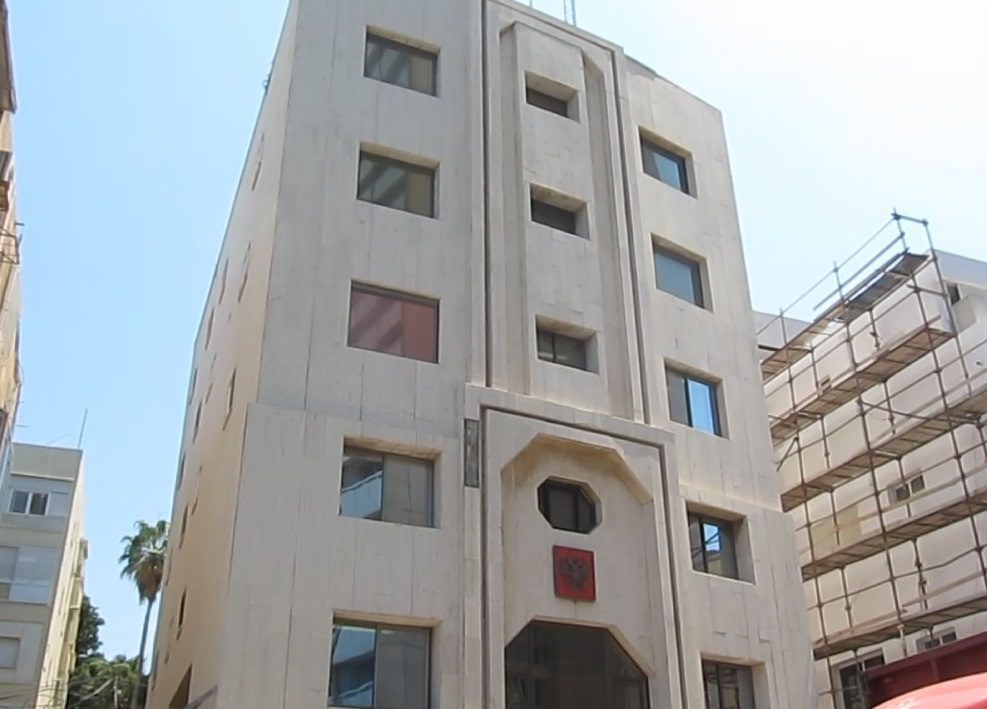
Embassy of Russia

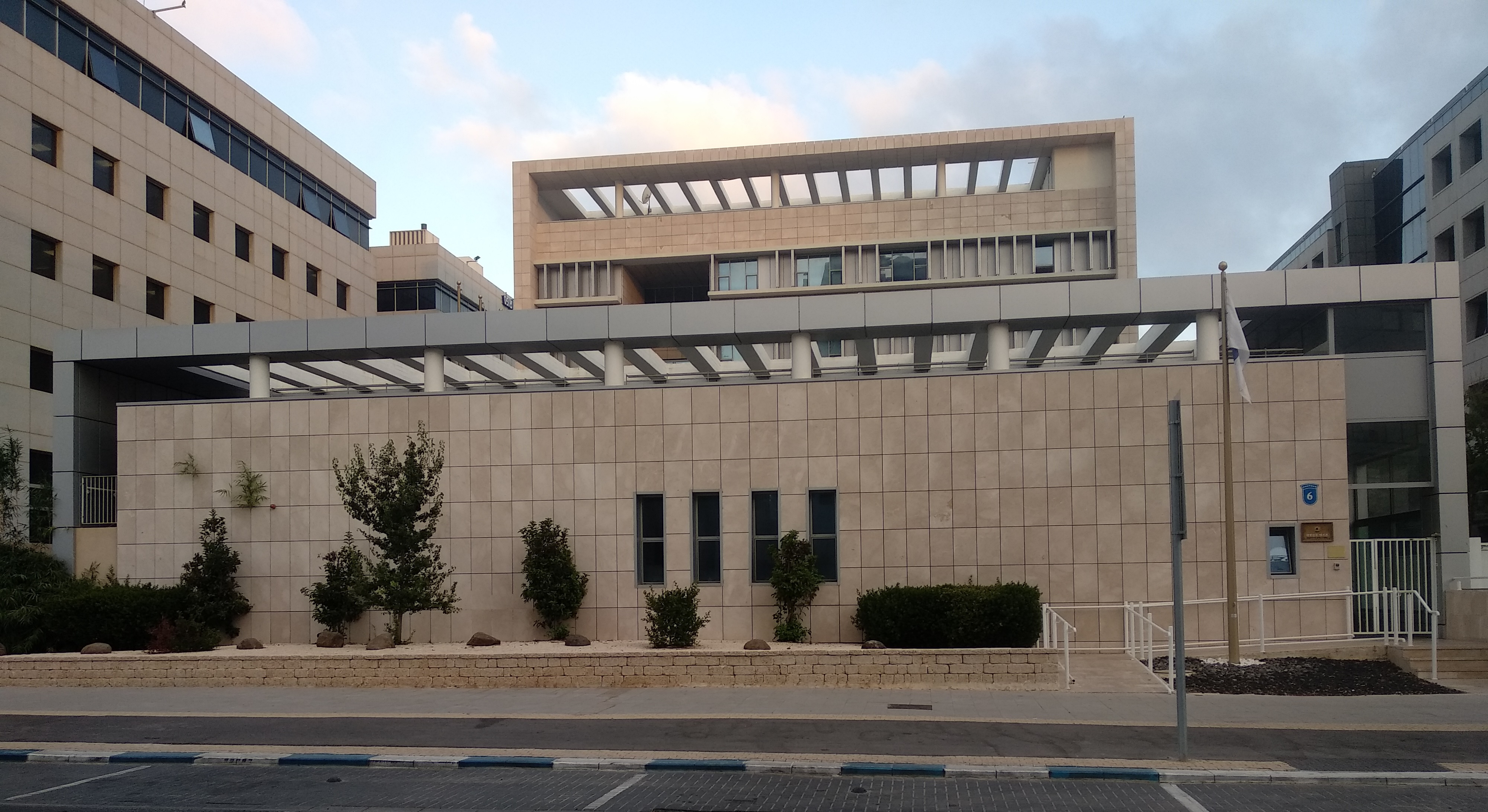
Embassy of South Korea

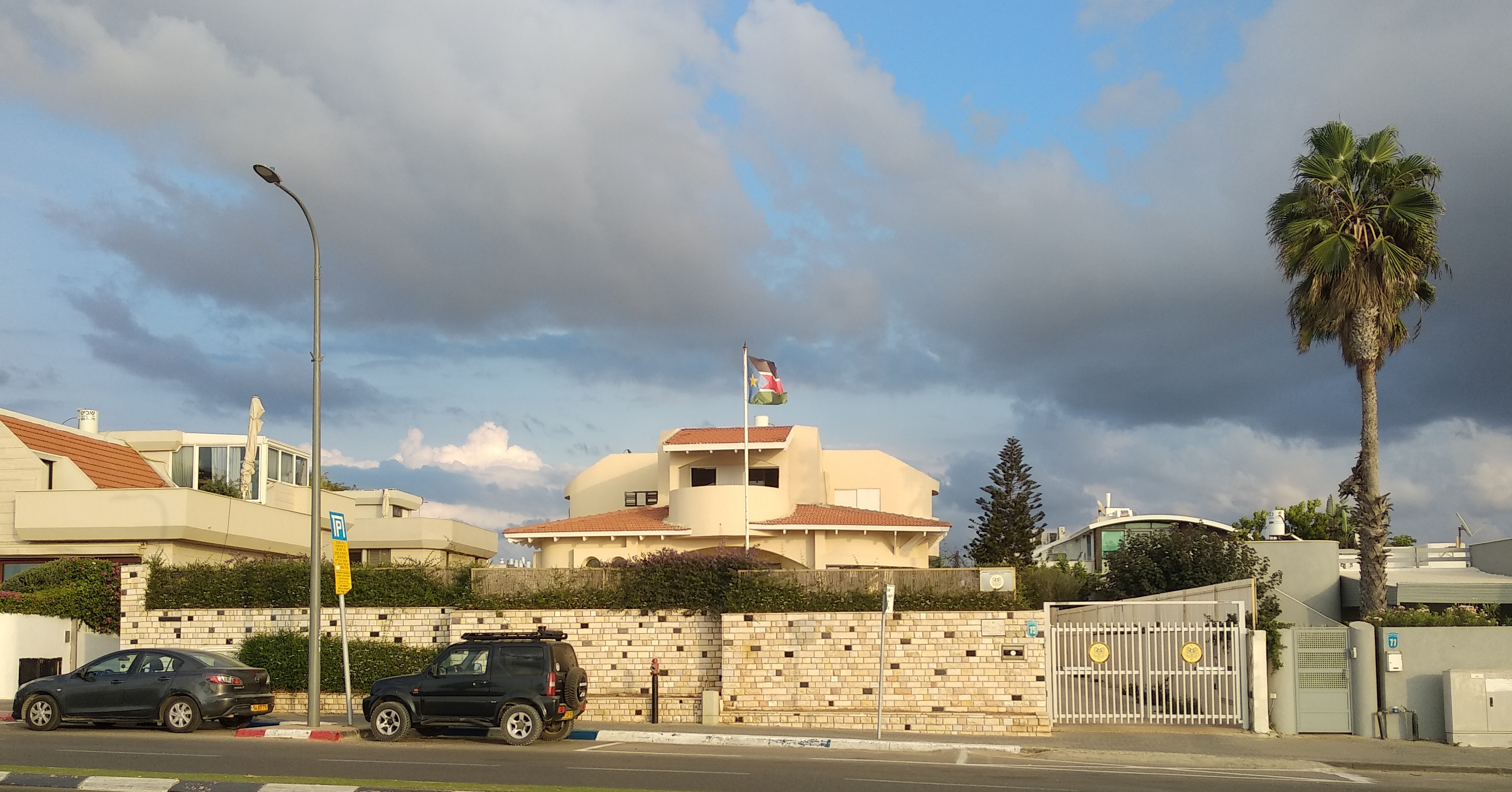
Embassy of South Sudan

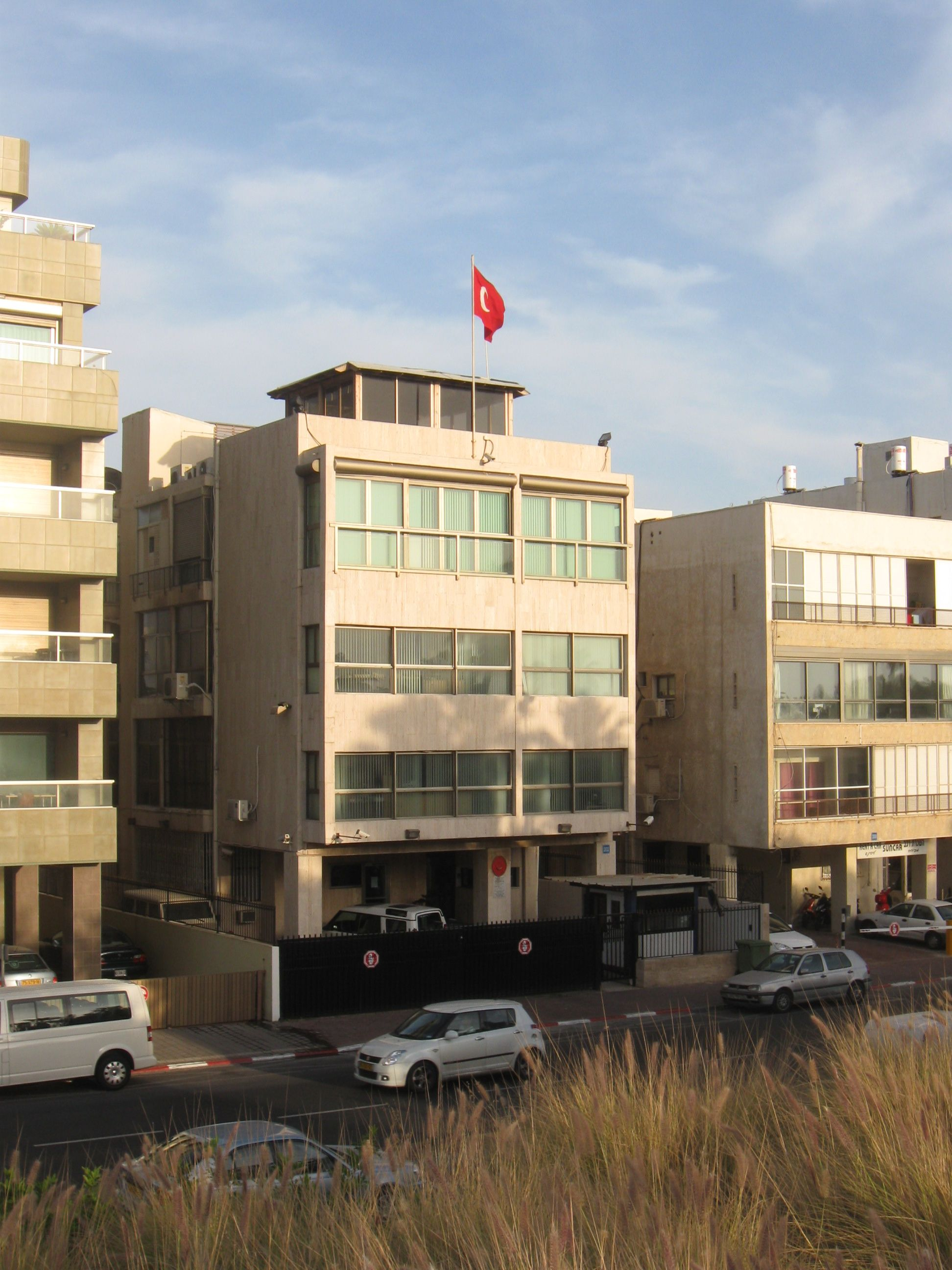
Embassy of Turkey

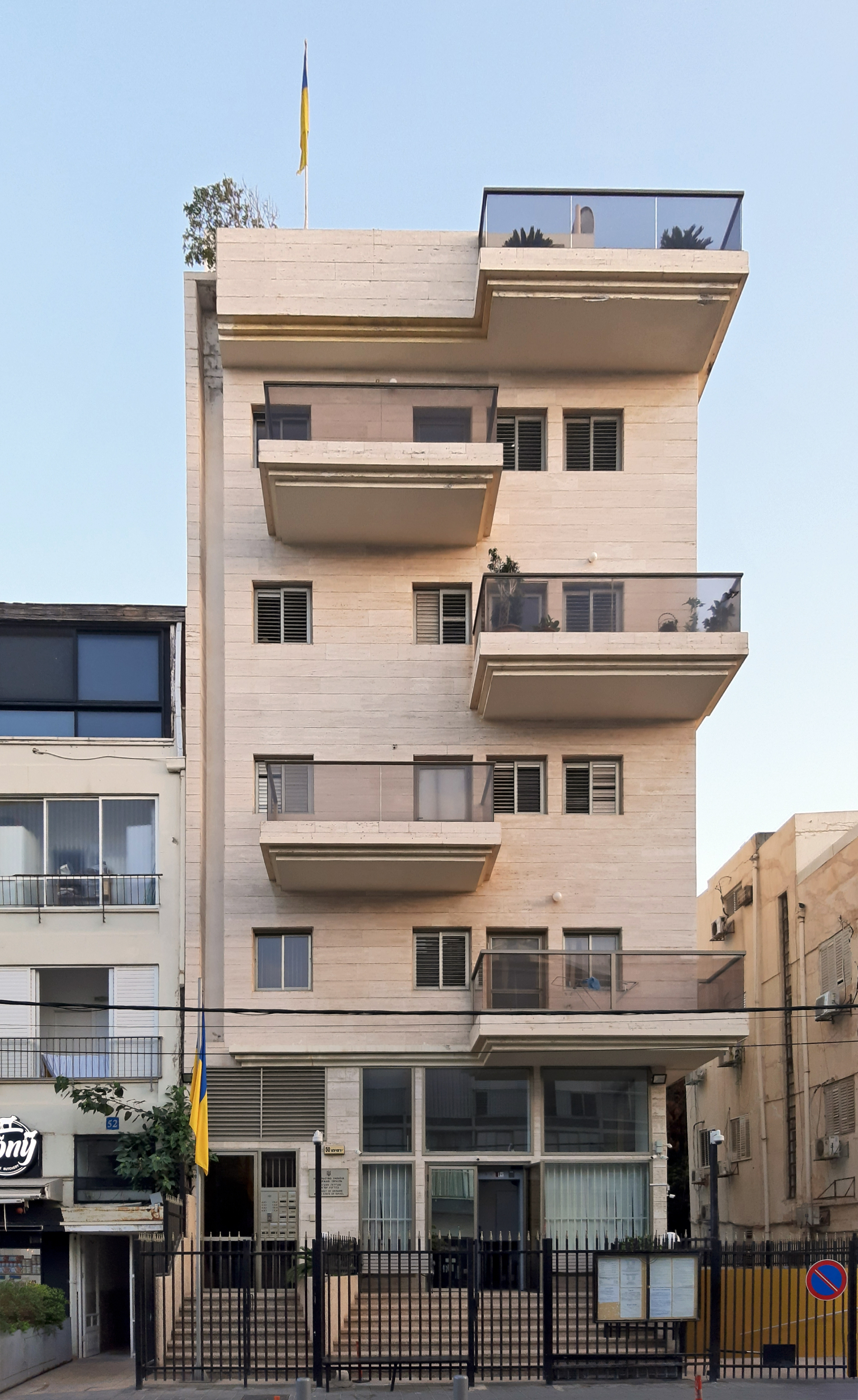
Embassy of Ukraine

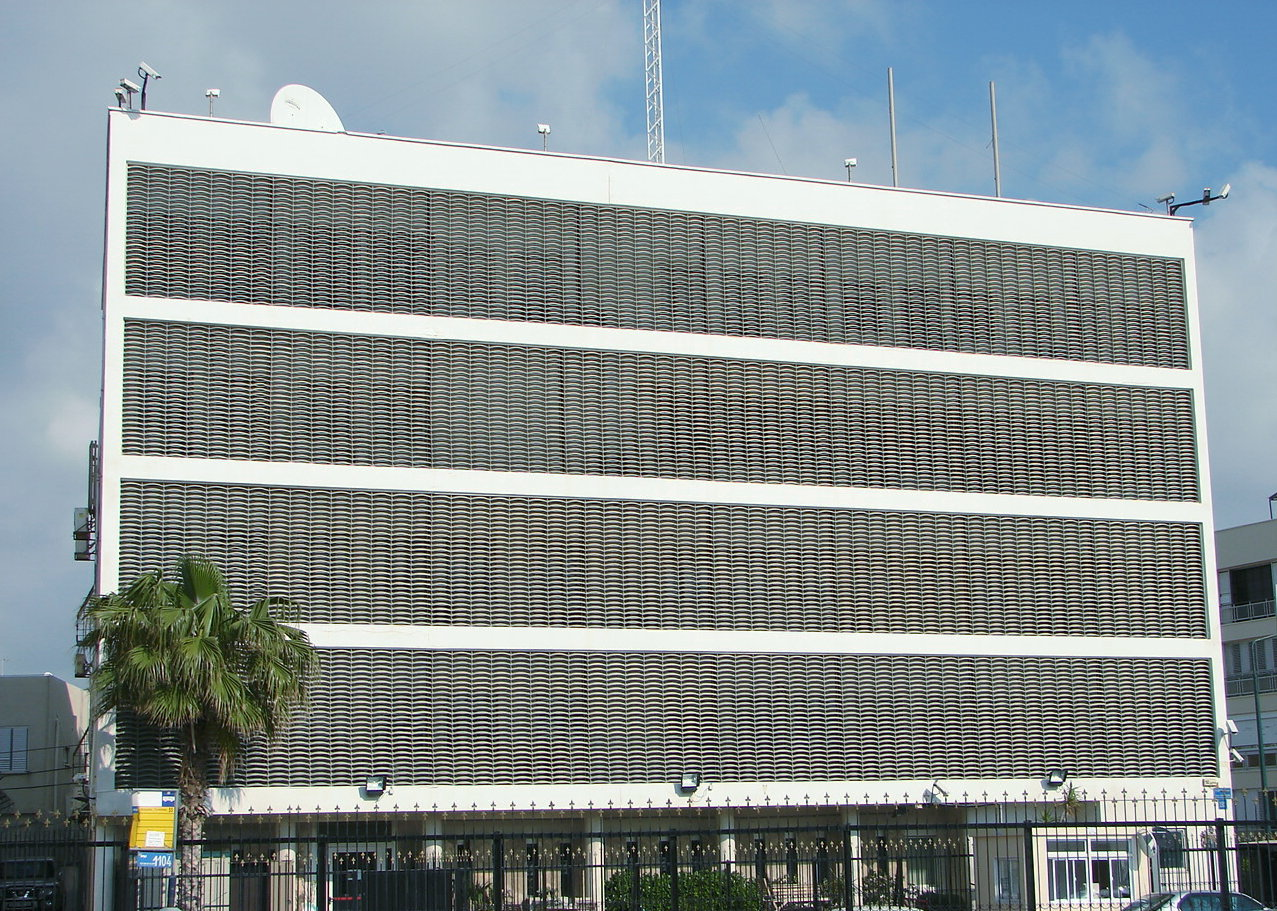
Embassy of the United Kingdom

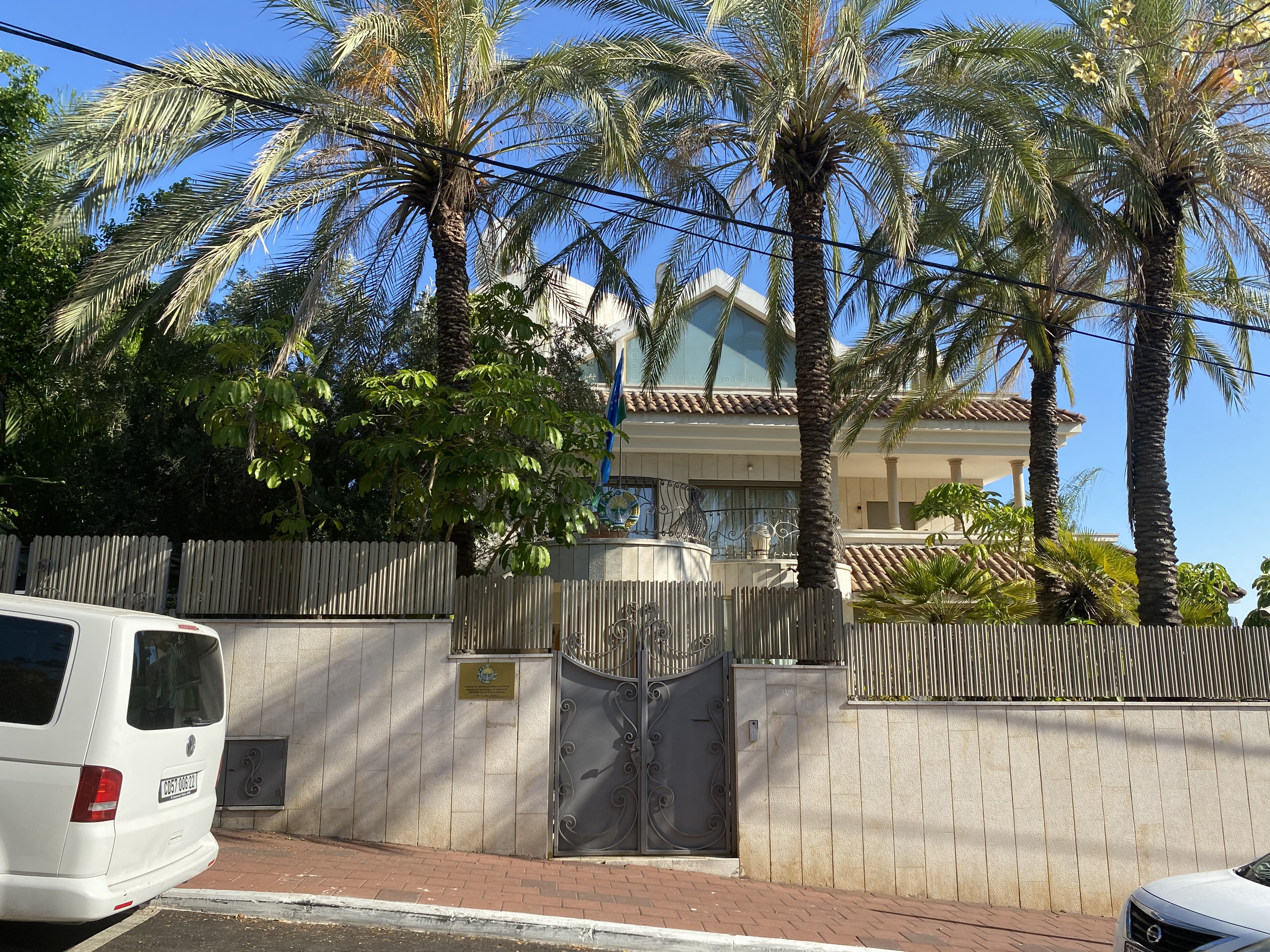
Embassy of Uzbekistan

== Consulates-General ==
=== Eilat ===
- Egypt

=== Haifa ===
- France
- Romania
- Russia

=== Jerusalem ===
This is the list of countries that operate consulates within the Jerusalem municipal boundary but are accredited to the city of Jerusalem, West Bank and Gaza Strip only. These missions are not directly accredited to the Palestinian Authority and also not to Israel. Between 1844 and 2019, the United States maintained a consulate-general in Jerusalem that conducted relations with the Palestinians. In March 2019, the consulate general was merged into the new US Embassy in Jerusalem and many of its responsibilities were assumed by the embassy's new Palestinian Affairs Unit. Countries listed below already maintain separate embassies to Israel. For diplomatic missions accredited to the Palestinian Authority directly located inside the Palestinian territories of West Bank and Gaza Strip, see: List of diplomatic missions in Palestine.

- Belgium
- France (Consulate General)
- Greece
- Holy See (Apostolic Delegation)
- Italy
- Spain (Consulate General)
- Sweden (Consulate General)
- Turkey
- United Kingdom (Mission)

=== Tel Aviv ===
- Luxembourg (Trade and Investment Office)
- United States (Embassy branch office)

== Non-resident embassies ==
Resident in Ankara, Turkey:

- Kyrgyzstan
- Mongolia
- New Zealand
- Tajikistan
- Turkmenistan

Resident in Cairo, Egypt:

- Burkina Faso
- Cambodia
- Mozambique
- Namibia
- Senegal
- Uganda
- Zimbabwe

Resident in London, United Kingdom:

- Barbados
- Botswana
- Gambia
- Sierra Leone

Resident in Paris, France:

- Guinea
- Guinea Bissau
- Laos
- Madagascar
- Togo

Resident in Rome, Italy:

- Benin
- Gabon
- Lesotho

Other resident cities:

- Bhutan (New Delhi)
- Burundi (Addis Ababa)
- Cape Verde (Washington D.C.)
- Eswatini (Addis Ababa)
- Grenada (Chicago)
- Iceland (Stockholm)
- Jamaica (Berlin)
- Micronesia (Suva)
- Montenegro (Brussels)
- Palau (New York City)
- Seychelles (New Delhi)

== Closed missions ==
Host city	Sending country	Mission	Year closed	Ref.
Jerusalem	Khmer Republic	Embassy	1975	
Tel Aviv	Iran	Embassy	1979	
Tel Aviv	Mauritania	Embassy	2009	
Tel Aviv	Qatar	Trade office	2000	
Tel Aviv	Tunisia	Interest office	2000	
Tel Aviv	Venezuela	Embassy (Note: Under the protecting power of Spain.)	2009	
Haifa	Ukraine	Consulate-General	2014	
Haifa	United States	Consular Agency	2019	

== Missions to open ==
- Liberia (Embassy)
- Morocco (Embassy)
- Samoa (Embassy)
- Sierra Leone (Embassy)
- Uganda (Embassy)

== States with no relations ==
1. Afghanistan
2. Algeria
3. Bangladesh
4. Belize
5. Brunei
6. Comoros
7. Cuba
8. Djibouti
9. Indonesia
10. Iran
11. Iraq
12. Kuwait
13. Lebanon
14. Libya
15. Malaysia
16. Maldives
17. Mali
18. Mauritania
19. Nicaragua
20. Niger
21. North Korea
22. Oman
23. Pakistan
24. Qatar
25. Saudi Arabia
26. Somalia
27. Syria
28. Tunisia
29. Venezuela
30. Yemen

== See also ==
- Foreign relations of Israel
- List of Consulates-General in Jerusalem
- List of diplomatic missions of Israel
- Israeli passport
- Visa policy of Israel
- Visa requirements for Israeli citizens
