= The Suit =

The Suit may refer to:

- Demi's Birthday Suit or The Suit, a trompe-l'œil body painting by Joanne Gair
- "The Suit" (short story), a 1963 short story by Can Themba
- The Suit (2003 film), a film by Bakhtyar Khudojnazarov
- The Suit (2016 film), a short drama film from South Africa

== See also ==
- Suit (disambiguation)
