= Suite =

Suite may refer to:

== Arts and entertainment ==
- Suite (music), a set of musical pieces considered as one composition
  - Suite (Bach), a list of suites composed by J. S. Bach
  - Suite (Cassadó), a mid-1920s composition by Gaspar Cassadó
  - Suite (Penderecki), a 1994 composition by Krzysztof Penderecki
  - Category:Suites (music)
- Suite, a set of related illustrations considered to be part of one art composition (e.g., the Vollard Suite by Picasso)
- Suite!, a 2019 album by Roberto Magris
- "Suite", a poem by Patti Smith from her book Babel
- Suite PreCure, a series of the Pretty Cure anime franchise

== Architecture and design ==
- Suite (address), a kind of address or location in an office building, shopping mall, etc.
- Suite (hotel), a type of hotel room
- Secondary suite, an additional separate dwelling unit on a property that would normally accommodate only one dwelling unit
- Luxury box, or suite, the most expensive class of seating in stadiums or arenas

== Other uses ==
- Suite (geology), a lithodemic unit
- Software suite, a collection of related software
- Retinue, or suite, retainers in service of a dignitary
- Living-room suite, a couch with two matching chairs

== See also ==
- Droit de suite, in copyright law, a right to compensation for resale of artworks
- Suit (disambiguation)
- Suite française (disambiguation)
- Sweet (disambiguation)
