= Israel–Taiwan relations =

- Israel: Taiwan

Diplomatic mission
- Israel Economic and Cultural Office in Taipei: Taipei Economic and Cultural Office in Tel Aviv

Envoy
- Israel Strulov: Ya-Ping (Abby) Lee

Israel–Taiwan relations describe the relations between the State of Israel and the Republic of China (Taiwan), which are not official in light of Taiwan's international status, although the two countries have economic and commercial relations, and Israel has an Economic and Cultural Office in Taipei since 1993. The unofficial relations between the two countries are mainly expressed in the fields of science, trade and industry.

== History ==
The government of Nationalist China has always been sympathetic and supportive of Zionism. In 1947, China abstained in the United Nations Partition Plan for Palestine but later officially recognized Israel in March 1949 and voted in the United Nations General Assembly to accept Israel as a member state, allowing Israel to send a consul to China. The consul was stationed in Shanghai to deal with the transfer of Jewish refugees to Israel. However, when the Nationalist government moved to Taiwan, a former Qing province and later Japanese colony from 1895 to 1945, due to the Chinese Civil War, Israel's consul in Shanghai Walter Eytan stated: “According to our country's recognition policy, our recognition must be based on a pragmatic basis... There is no doubt that the government of the Republic is an effective government that controls the Mainland China." This idea established the general direction of Israel's China policy.

On 9 January 1950, Israel officially recognized the newly established People's Republic of China, becoming the first country in the Middle East to do so. By then, the People's Republic of China had taken over the entire country. As a result, all existing ties between Israel and Taiwan were severed. Taiwan even refused to grant visas to Israelis.

In 1959, Israel instructed the country's ambassador to the United Nations, “Although our exchanges with Communist China are not smooth, we must try to avoid contact with the Kuomintang regime in Taiwan.” However, China did not establish diplomatic relations with Israel. During the Cold War, based on the line of opposing imperialism and export of revolution, the Chinese Communist Party supported Arab countries against Israel and maintained hostile relations with its government. It was not until 1992 that China and Israel established diplomatic relations. But even so, Israel has not established diplomatic relations with Taiwan. Based on the fact that both countries are allies of the United States, the United States has always provided military and economic support to the two countries.

On 25 October 1971, Israel voted against the Republic of China's continued stay in the United Nations, that is, United Nations General Assembly Resolution 2758. In the early 1980s, Israel had diplomatic relations with only seven of the twenty-eight Asian countries. The countries that did not have any relations with Israel were Muslim or communist countries to which Taiwan was added. On 24 January 1992, Israel and China established diplomatic relations. The government of Taiwan expressed its concern and stated that “Any matter concerning my country's sovereignty and rights mentioned in the Communiqué on the Establishment of Diplomatic Relations between the State of Israel and the People's Republic of China will not be recognized. With regard to the future relations between China and Israel, our side will consider carefully based on national interests before making a decision."

On 29 March 1993, the "Taipei Economic and Trade Office" opened in Tel Aviv, and on 18 July 1993, Israel opened the "Israel Economic and Trade Office" in Taipei, thus receiving trade relations between the two countries. On 11 September 1995, the representative offices of the two parties were renamed "Taipei Economic and Cultural Office in Tel Aviv" and "Israel Economic and Cultural Office in Taipei".

In March 2002, the second Taiwan, United States, and Israel Trilateral National Defense and Security Seminar was held in Israel, inviting tripartite scholars to discuss issues of common concern such as diplomacy, national defense, and strategy, and establish a second-track dialogue.

During the "Iron Armour Combat Camp" in 2011, a photo of three students wearing Nazi uniforms was posted on the official website of the Ministry of National Defense. This incident ultimately led to an official apology to the Israeli representatives in Taiwan.

Following the October 7 attacks in 2023 the Taiwanese government strongly condemned the attacks and voiced its support of Israel.

The pagers used by Israeli intelligence in the 2024 Lebanon pager explosions carried the mark of Taiwanese company Gold Apollo as cover. The Taiwanese angle to the story caused it to be covered heavily in Taiwan. Both Gold Apollo and the Taiwanese government clarified that they were not directly involved with the Israeli operation. Israel said that the operation had not damaged relations with Taiwan which remained good.

In 2025, Boaz Toporovsky led a Knesset delegation to Taiwan. The Chinese embassy in Israel objected strongly to the trip labeling Toporovsky a ‘trouble-maker’ and saying that such trips endanger the foundations of Israel-China relations. Toporovsky is the chair of the Knesset's Israel-Taiwan Friendship Group and the delegation met with a number of Taiwanese legislators and officials including Vice President Hsiao Bi-khim. In December 2025, it was reported that Taiwanese deputy foreign minister Wu Chih-chung made an unpublicized visit to Israel.

== Economic relations ==
In 1997, the bilateral trade volume between Taiwan and Israel was twice the trade volume between China and Israel.

In 2020, Israel is the 29th largest trading partner, 29th largest import partner, and 29th largest export partner of Taiwan. The value of exports to Israel was US$842.825,815, an annual increase of 7.706%. Imports from Israel amounted to 1.069.7 million US$2,546, an annual increase of 7.787%. In 2020, Taiwan was ranked 5th in the list of the largest outlets for Israeli goods in Asia, totaling 2.5 billion shekels.

The total amount of investment by Taiwan in Israel is about 280 million U.S. dollars. The investment of Taiwanese companies is mainly through equity investment, with relatively little involvement in actual operations. In addition to purchasing diamonds from Taiwanese businesspeople coming to Israel, high tech industries are also major cooperation projects. In November 2025, Taiwan and Israel signed memoranda of understanding on intellectual-property cooperation and a Patent Prosecution Highway (PPH) program; Taiwan's Intellectual Property Office (TIPO) said the TIPO–ILPO program launched on 2 January 2026, making Israel its eighth PPH partner.

In 2025, Taiwan's representative to Israel, Abby Ya‑Ping Lee, announced that Taiwan intends to donate funding for the Nanasi Medical Centre in the Sha'ar Binyamin Industrial Zone, located in the occupied West Bank. The pledge was made during her visit to the Mateh Binyamin Regional Council, which governs 48 Israeli settlements in the West Bank. According to the South China Morning Post, this pledge marks Taiwan as the first foreign government to finance a health project within an Israeli settlement in the West Bank as the international community considers Israeli settlements in the West Bank illegal under international law, although the Israeli government disputes this. The pledge has been met with criticism within Taiwan, including from Hsiao Hsu-tsen, CEO of the Ma Ying-jeou Foundation, who condemned it as a tacit recognition of the legitimacy of Israeli settlements by the Taiwanese government. In response, Ministry of Foreign Affairs of Taiwan spokesman Hsiao Kuang-wei clarified that the donation is still under discussion.

== Military ties ==
The military cooperation between Israel's aerospace industry and Taiwan can be traced back to the Republic of China's withdrawal from the United Nations in 1971. Taiwan's military pursued the self-reliance of weapons and decentralized procurement sources. During this period, Israel vigorously expanded its military, hoping to share the cost of weapon research and development through export sales of military products. However, considering the relationship between Taiwan and Arab countries, everything is done under confidentiality.

In 1975, when the United States refused to sell Sidewinder missiles to Taiwan under pressure from China, Israel sold anti-aircraft missiles and licensed the production of Gabriel II anti-ship missiles. The Taiwanese military was renamed Hsiung Feng I, which was later developed into a series of missiles. This is the first arms deal between the two sides. By 1989, a total of 523 missiles and 77 launchers had been produced. The remaining licensed production includes 50 Dvora-class fast patrol boats, as well as a large number of firearms and mortars, including 127 mm Python rocket launchers, IMI Galil rifles, Uzi mini submachine guns, and various other electronic equipment and weapons.

Since then, arms sales by both sides have risen rapidly, both in quantity and in quality. Taiwan's AIDC F-CK-1 Ching-kuo fighter jets and 300 F-5 fighter jets were all upgraded from Israel, equipped with Israeli-licensed radars produced in Taiwan and Taiwanese Navy's Yang class destroyers was equipped with Gabriel anti-ship missiles and Israel's aerospace industry. The Reshet fire control and command system was sold, and other companies refurbished 13 old warships. In addition, the underground aircraft shelter system, weapons and fuel storage systems are believed to have adopted the Israeli model.

The British Jane's Information Group in the 1980s speculated that the Qingfeng missile development process received a lot of technical support from Israel. In 2001, the National Zhongshan Academy of Sciences also stated in its internal publication that the Qingfeng missile had assistance from Israel. The missile entered service in October 1991.

After China purchased Russia’s Kilo-class submarine, in order to maintain the balance of the Taiwan Strait, Taiwanese military sought to purchase new conventional submarines. Because the United States focuses on the development of Nuclear submarine and no longer produces conventional submarines, it once again set its sights on Israel. Taking into account the response of China, the United States came forward to coordinate and formulated the method of Israeli design, German production, and American purchase and delivery. Israel's Dolphin-class submarine has been a goal of the military for many years. For this reason, Antonio Chiang, who was the deputy secretary-general of National Security Council of Taiwan, and advisory committee member Ke Chengheng, have visited the United States and Israel.

On 10 September 2001, the United Daily News disclosed that Taiwanese military had a "major breakthrough" in monitoring to China. The two sides reached a secret agreement to officially lease Israel's Earth Remote Observation System-A (EROS A). Commercial spy satellites, as well as three other satellites of the same type that are about to be launched, have carried out dynamic reconnaissance and search on the facilities and troops of the Chinese People's Liberation Army over a period of six years. Relying on this satellite, the detection targets will penetrate deep into the interior of China, and the detection targets include all "missile launch bases that pose a threat to Taiwan." According to the intelligence provided by the satellite, it can provide accurate information for the military "raid" mainland China. In this transaction, Israel's profit will be as high as 2 billion US dollars. In addition, the two sides are also cooperating on a highly confidential "Tiangui" (天貴) project, which aims to improve the military's ability to locate radars and radio monitors.

== See also ==
- Palestine–Taiwan relations
