= Sweetness (disambiguation) =

Sweetness is one of the five basic tastes.

Sweetness may also refer to:

- Sweetness of wine
- "Sweetness" (Terence Trent D'Arby song)
- "Sweetness" (Fischerspooner song)
- "Sweetness" (Michelle Gayle song) (1994)
- "Sweetness" (Jimmy Eat World song) (2002)
- "Sweetness" (Lili Haydn song)
- "Sweetness" (Misia song) (1999)
- "Sweetness" (Toadies song)
- "Sweetness" (Umphrey's McGee song)
- "Sweetness" (The Waifs song)
- "Sweetness" (Yes song)
- "The Sweetness" (Ashton Irwin song)
- Sweetness (novel), a 1995 novel by Torgny Lindgren
- Sweetness (film), a 2025 thriller film
- Walter Payton, American football player nicknamed "Sweetness" (1953–1999)
- Sweetness, a character in Roll Bounce

== See also ==
- Sweet (disambiguation)
- Swete, a surname
