= Taipei Economic and Cultural Office, Tel Aviv =

Political representative office in Tel Aviv, Israel

Taipei Economic and Cultural Office in Tel Aviv 駐臺拉維夫臺北經濟文化辦事處
- משרד הנציגות הכלכלית והתרבותית של טייפה בתל
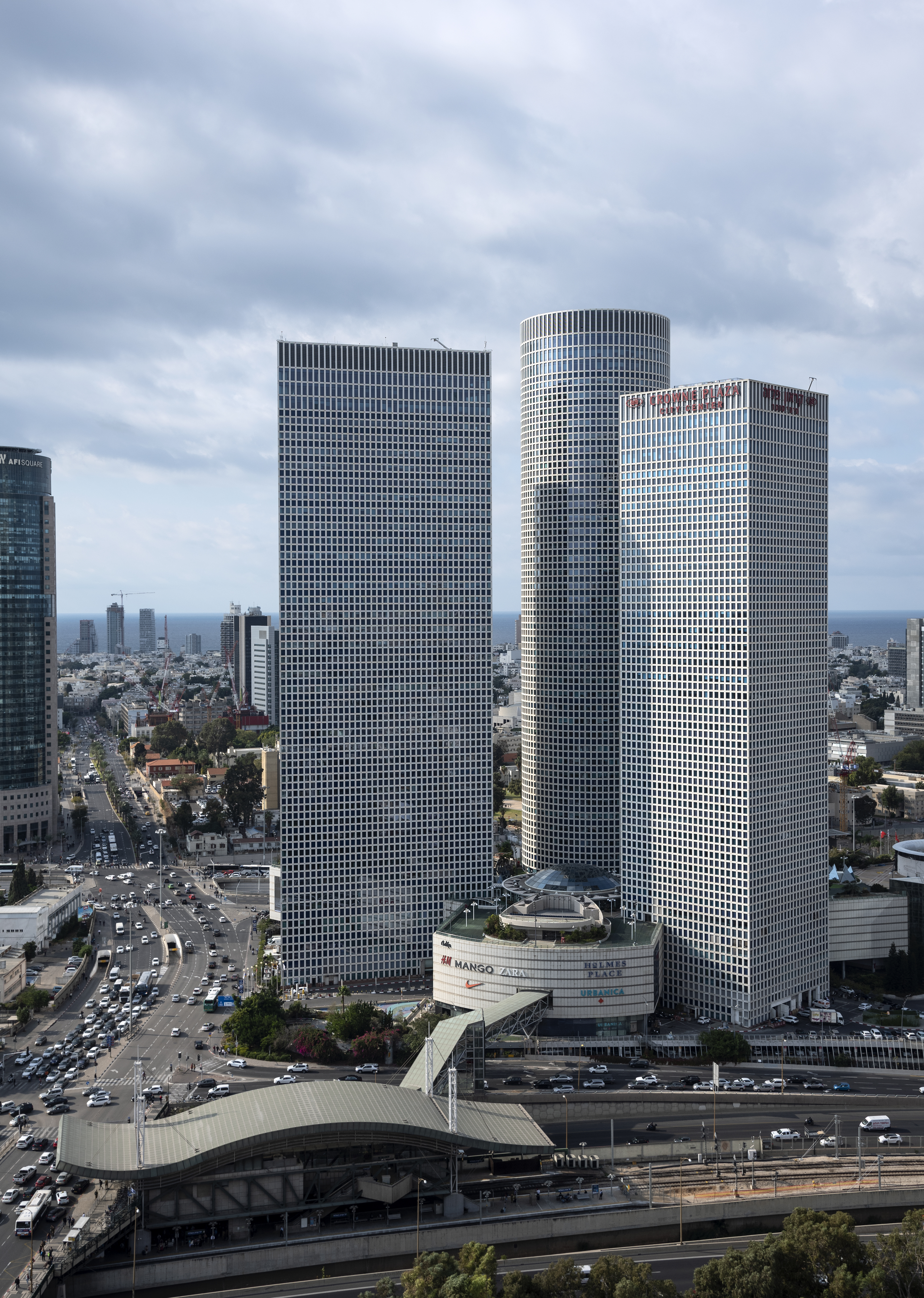
- Azrieli Center where the representative office is located (round building)

Agency overview
- Formed: March 1993 (as Taipei Economic and Trade Office in Tel Aviv)
- Jurisdiction: Israel; Palestine
- Headquarters: 21st floor, Azrieli Center, 132 Menachem Begin Road, Tel Aviv, Israel
- Agency executive: Abby Ya-ping Lee, Representative
- Website: Official website

The Taipei Economic and Cultural Office in Tel Aviv (Chinese: 駐臺拉維夫臺北經濟文化辦事處; pinyin: Zhù Tái Lā Wéifū wáiběi jīngjì wénhuà bànshì chù) (Hebrew: משרד הנציגות הכלכלית והתרבותית של טייפה בתל אביב) represents the interests of Taiwan in the State of Israel in the absence of formal diplomatic relations, functioning as a de facto embassy. Its counterpart is the Israel Economic and Cultural Office in Taipei, which was established in July 1993.

== Background ==
The aim of the representative office is to further bilateral cooperation between Israel and Taiwan in the fields of economics, culture, education and research. In addition, it offers consular services and the consular jurisdiction of the office also extends to the State of Palestine.

On 11 November 1992, Israel and Taiwan reached an agreement on the mutual establishment of offices through an exchange of letters. On 29 March 1993, the Taipei Economic and Trade Office in Tel Aviv was established. On 11 September 1995, the representative office was renamed to Taipei Economic and Cultural Office in Tel Aviv.

Since January 2022, the office is headed by a representative, currently Abby Ya-ping Lee, who previously served as the deputy director of the African department of the Ministry of Foreign Affairs of Taiwan.

== See also ==
- Israel–Taiwan relations
