= Suite française =

Suite française ("French suite") may refer to:

Musical compositions:

- Suites françaises, by Johann Sebastian Bach
- Suite française (Poulenc), FP.80, by Francis Poulenc
- Suite française, by Jean Roger-Ducasse
- Suite française, Op.248 (1944), Op.254 (1945), by Darius Milhaud
- Suite française, by André Jolivet
- Suite française, album by Jacques Israelievitch

Other uses:

- Suite française, a 1943 French documentary short-film directed by René Zuber and Roger Leenhardt
- Suite française (Némirovsky), a 2004 novel by the French writer Irène Némirovsky
- Suite française (film), a 2015 film based on Némirovsky's novel
