= Swete =

Swete is a surname. Notable people with the surname include:

- Anthony Swete (1942–2017), American soul singer
- Henry Barclay Swete (1835–1917), English Biblical scholar and professor of divinity
- John Swete (1752–1821), English clergyman, artist, antiquary, and topographer

== See also ==
- Sweet (disambiguation)
- Swetes
