= Sweet (disambiguation) =

Sweet is a basic taste sensation associated with sugars.

Sweet may also refer to:

== Food ==
- Candy or sweets
- Confectionery or sweet
- Dessert or sweet
- Sweet (wine), a sweetness classification

== Music ==
- The Sweet, a 1970s British glam rock band
  - The Sweet (album) (1973)
- Sweet (Chara album) (1991)
- Sweet (Ken Mellons album) (2004)
- Sweet (Mayday Parade album) (2025)
- "Sweet" (Brockhampton song)
- "Sweet", a song by Annie from Don't Stop
- "Sweet", a song by Cigarettes After Sex from their self-titled album
- "Sweet", a song by Common from The Dreamer/The Believer
- "Sweet", a song by Jay Chou from On the Run!
- "Sweet", a song by Lana Del Rey from Did You Know That There's a Tunnel Under Ocean Blvd

== People ==
- Sweet (surname)
- Sweet Charles Sherrell (1943–2023), American bassist
- Chun Jung-Hee or Sweet (born 1983), former Warcraft III player

== Places ==
- Sweet River, Jamaica
- Sweet, Idaho, United States, an unincorporated community

== Other uses ==
- Asa Sweet, a male lion character from the Lackadaisy webcomics that debuted in 2006
- Sweet (company), a United States travel company
- Sweet (film), a 2000 short film by James Pilkington starring Noel Fielding and Julian Barratt
- Swedish ethyl acetate method, a method of chemical analysis
- Sweet crude oil, petroleum with less than 0.42% sulfur
- Sweet, a minor villain in Buffy the Vampire Slayer
- Sean "Sweet" Johnson, a character in Grand Theft Auto: San Andreas
- SWEET transporters, a family of sugar transporters found in plants, animals, protozoans, and bacteria

== See also ==
- Sweets (disambiguation)
- Swete, a surname
- Swetes, Antigua, Antigua and Barbuda; also called "Sweet's"
- Suite (disambiguation)
