= Sugar free (disambiguation) =

Sugar free foods use sugar substitutes for sweetness.

Sugar free may also refer to:

- Sugarfree (Filipino band), a Filipino Indiepop/rock band
- Sugarfree (Italian band), Italian pop-rock band from Catania, Sicily
- "Sugar Free" (Wa Wa Nee song), 1986
- Sugar Free (T-ara song), 2014
- "Sugar Free", a song by Diana Ross from Every Day Is a New Day
- "Sugar Free", a song by the Mighty Mighty Bosstones from A Jackknife to a Swan
- "Sugar Free", a song by Hedley from Hedley

== See also ==
- Diet food
