= Suit (disambiguation) =

A suit is a set of garments with matching pieces, typically a jacket and trousers or pencil skirt.

Suit or suits may also refer to:

- Playing card suit, one of four groups into which a deck of cards is divided
- Lawsuit, an action brought before a court to recover a right or redress a grievance

== Arts and media ==
- Suit (DC Comics), fictional entity from DC Comics
- Suit (album), a 2004 album by Nelly
- Suits (album), a 1994 album by Fish
- Suits (film), a 1999 American comedy film
- Suits (American TV series), a 2011 series on the USA Network
  - Suits LA, a 2025 American spin-off TV series
  - Suits (South Korean TV series), a Korean remake of the U.S. series
  - Suits (Japanese TV series), a Japanese remake of the U.S. series
- "Suit & Tie", a song by Justin Timberlake

== Clothing ==
- Beekeeping suit, worn by an apiarist to prevent stings when handling honeybees
- Boilersuit, or coverall, a loose-fitting one-piece clothing
- Diving suit, for use under water
  - Dry suit, for use in colder water, or where hazardous chemicals may be encountered
  - Wetsuit, for use in warmer water
- Environmental suit, a clothing used for a particular activity or environment
- Jumpsuit, a one-piece clothing with sleeves and legs
- Leisure suit
- Racing suit, a special clothing worn by racing drivers during races
- Ski suit, for skiing
- Space suit, for use in outer space
- Swimsuit, a clothing for use in water sports or sunbathing

== See also ==
- Suite (disambiguation)
