= Paratroopers at the Western Wall =

1967 photograph by David Rubinger

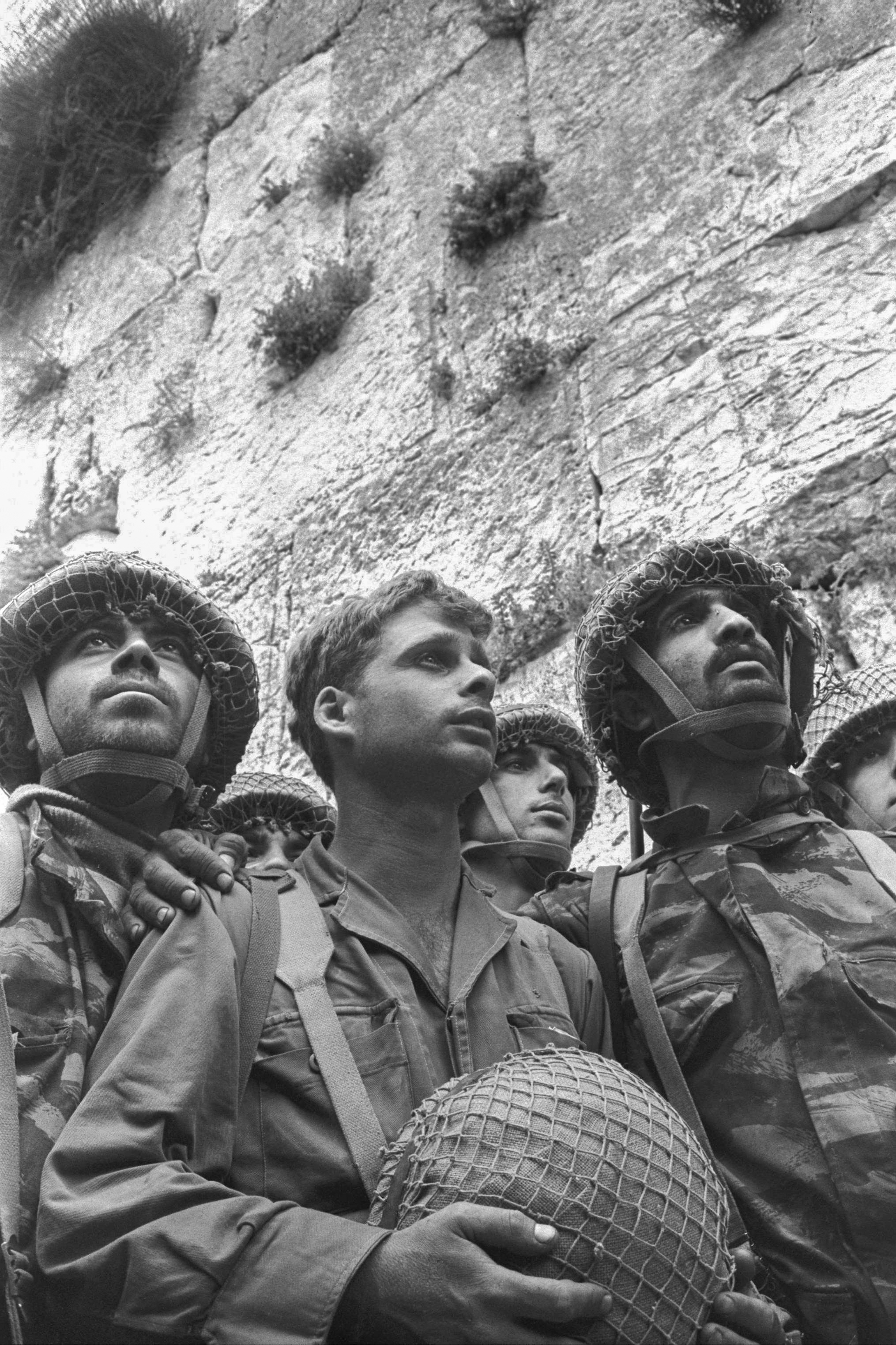
Paratroopers at the Western Wall, by David Rubinger

Paratroopers at the Western Wall is a photograph taken on 7 June 1967, by David Rubinger. Shot from a low angle, the photograph depicts three Israeli paratroopers framed against the Western Wall in the Old City of Jerusalem, shortly after its capture by Israeli forces in the Six-Day War. From left to right, the Israeli soldiers in the foreground are Zion Karasenti, Yitzhak Yifat, and Haim Oshri. The soldiers behind them are, from right to left, Alex Shavit, Haim Cohen, and Shimon Fitoussi. The soldiers were reservists of the 66th Battalion, 55th Paratroopers Brigade.

Prior to taking the photograph, Israeli photographer and photojournalist Rubinger had been at el-Arish on the Sinai Peninsula when he heard a rumor that something big was going to happen in Jerusalem. He hopped aboard a helicopter ferrying wounded soldiers to Beersheba, although he did not know its destination at the time. His car happened to be there, and he drove the rest of the way, at one point asking a hitchhiking soldier he had picked up to drive because he was too sleepy. He arrived in the Old City and after visiting quickly with his family, made his way to the Wall. The space between the Wall and the buildings in front of it was very narrow, so he laid down to get a shot of the Wall itself, when the paratroopers walked by and he took several shots of them.

Twenty minutes later, IDF Chief Rabbi Shlomo Goren arrived on scene with a shofar and a Torah scroll, whereupon Goren was hoisted upon the shoulders of the soldiers. It was an emotional scene and Rubinger by far preferred that one, though his wife Anni told him "the one of the three soldiers" was better.

As part of his agreement with the IDF allowing him front-line access, he turned the negatives over to the government, who distributed it to everyone for a mere IL2 each. It was then widely pirated as well. Although Rubinger was upset about his work being stolen, the widespread distribution made it famous.

The image engenders such a strong emotional component that it has become an icon of Israel. Israeli Supreme Court Justice Misha'el Kheshin declared in 2001 that the photo had "become the property of the entire nation".

In 2021, a dispute arose over the identity of the soldier identified as Zion Karasenti. The family of Avraham Borstein, a soldier in the 55th Paratroopers Brigade who fought in the battle for the Old City and who had died in 1996, claimed that he was in fact the soldier pictured. After Borstein's family made legal threats against Karasenti demanding that he publicly state that he was not in the photograph, Karasenti sued the Borstein family for defamation and the Borstein family filed a countersuit for defamation against Karasenti in turn. Borstein's family hired forensic investigators to prove it was him in the photograph, and Karasenti rejected their findings. An investigation by Channel 12 found that it was highly likely that Karasenti was the paratrooper pictured. In 2024, the matter was resolved in Tel Aviv District Court when the opposing parties agreed that both Karasenti and the Borstein family could continue to claim the spot, with neither side required to recognize the other's claim.

Yitzhak Yifat died in July 2024 at the age of 81.
