= David Rubinger =

Israeli photographer and photojournalist (1924–2017)

David Rubinger דוד רובינגר
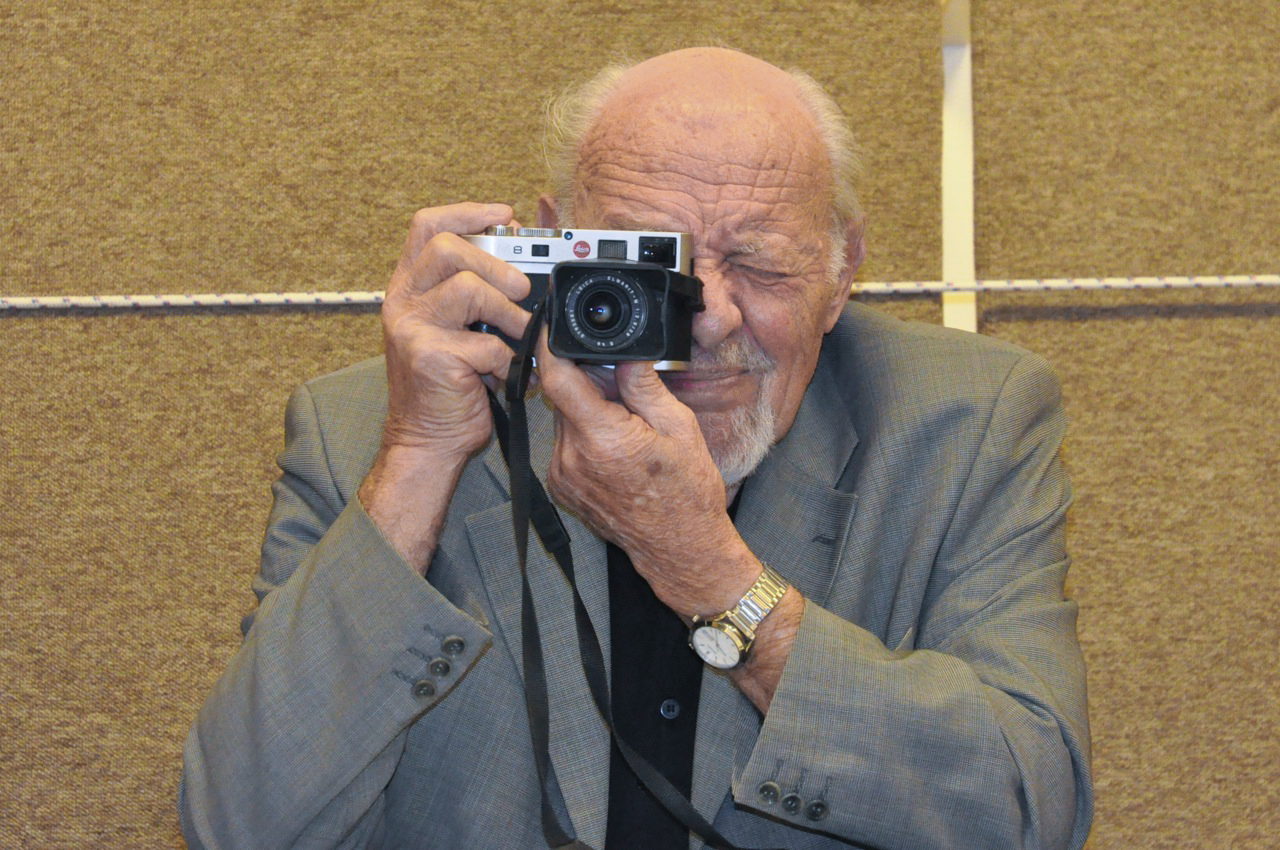
- David Rubinger with his Leica Camera
- Born: 29 June 1924; Vienna, Austria
- Died: 2 March 2017 (aged 92); Jerusalem
- Known for: photojournalism
- Notable work: Paratroopers at the Western Wall
- Movement: Israeli art
- Children: Ami Rubinger
- Awards: Israel Prize in Communications, 1997

David Rubinger (Hebrew: דוד רובינגר; 29 June 1924 – 2 March 2017) was an Israeli photographer and photojournalist. His famous photo of three Israeli paratroopers after the recapture of the Western Wall has become an iconic image of the Six-Day War. Shimon Peres called Rubinger "the photographer of the nation in the making".

== Biography ==
David Rubinger, an only child, was born in Vienna, Austria. When he was in high school, Nazi Germany annexed Austria in the Anschluss and with the help of Youth Aliyah, he escaped to Mandatory Palestine via Italy and settled in a Jordan Valley kibbutz. His father had already fled to England, but his mother was murdered in the Holocaust. During World War II, he joined the British Army and served as a driver in a transport unit in North Africa, Malta, and Italy. After the Jewish Brigade was established he was transferred to it. He took part in Aliyah Bet operations after the German surrender.

While on leave in Paris, a French girlfriend gave him a camera as a gift, and he discovered he enjoyed photography. He took his first professional photo of Jewish youths climbing a British military vehicle to celebrate the United Nations Partition Plan for Palestine. Rubinger joined the Haganah in 1947. During the 1948 Arab-Israeli War he served in the Israel Defense Forces and fought in the Jerusalem area, rising to become an officer. After the army recognized his photography skills, he was transferred to the photographic mapping and reconnaissance service, responsible for photographing enemy positions, towards the end of the war.

After the war, he visited his father in England and learned that he had other relatives in Germany. There, he met his cousin Anni and her mother, who had survived the Holocaust. He offered to marry her to secure her emigration to Palestine, but the marriage of convenience ended up lasting more than 50 years until her death. The couple had two children together, including notable children author and illustrator Ami Rubinger. He described his marriage as "tempestuous" and stated in his autobiography Israel Through My Lens that he had numerous affairs over the years. However, he faithfully cared for his wife in the final years of her life when she was stricken with cancer.

After Anni's death, Rubinger, aged 78, met Ziona Spivak, a Yemenite immigrant, with whom he had a relationship for two and a half years, although they never married. Spivak was murdered in her home in 2004 by her former gardener, Mohammad Mahmoud Sabarna, a Palestinian from the West Bank who entered the home and demanded that she give him 25,000 shekels, grabbing a knife and stabbing her to death when she refused.

Rubinger died on 2 March 2017 at the age of 92.

== Photography career ==
After being discharged from the IDF, Rubinger opened a photography accessories and materials store in Jerusalem. He broke into photojournalism when Uri Avnery offered him a position at HaOlam HaZeh in 1951, where he worked for two years. He then joined the staff of Yedioth Ahronoth, followed by The Jerusalem Post. His break came in 1954 when he was asked to shoot a story for Time–Life. He ended up working for them for more than 50 years. His first internationally published photo for them was of a nun holding a set of dentures that had belonged to a patient who had dropped them from a Catholic hospital window over the Green Line and into Jordanian territory. The nun was allowed to cross the border only after much negotiation.

As Time–Life's primary photographer for the region, Rubinger covered all of Israel's wars and was given unprecedented access to governmental leaders: he was the only photographer allowed in the Knesset cafeteria. With the sort of access and exposure that allows the subjects to disregard the photographer's presence, Rubinger was able to take memorable photos of Golda Meir feeding her granddaughter or quiet moments between Yitzhak and Leah Rabin, for example.

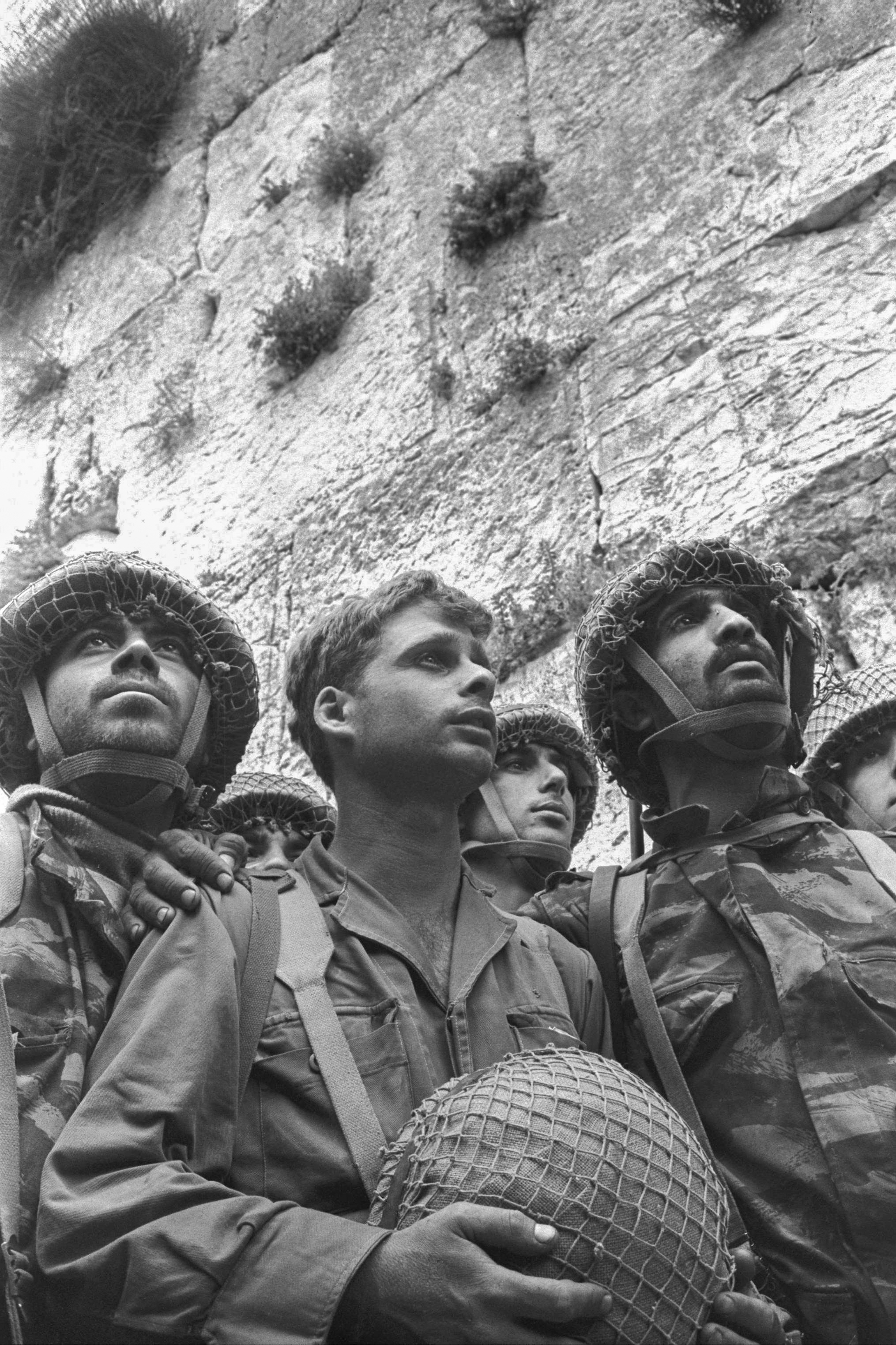
Paratroopers at the Western Wall

Rubinger's signature photograph is of paratroopers of the 55th Paratroopers Brigade at the Western Wall, shortly after its recapture by Israeli forces in the Six-Day War. Shot from a low angle, the faces of (left to right) Zion Karasenti, Yitzhak Yifat, and Haim Oshri are framed against the wall. The three of them are framed with their backs toward the wall, gazing off into the distance, and Yifat (centre) holds his helmet in his hand. Israeli author Yossi Klein Halevi calls it "the most beloved Jewish photographic image of our time".

Prior to taking the photograph, Rubinger had been at el-Arish on the Sinai Peninsula when he heard a rumour that something big was going to happen in Jerusalem. He hopped aboard a helicopter ferrying wounded soldiers to Beersheba, although he didn't know its destination at the time. His car happened to be there, and he drove the rest of the way, at one point asking a hitchhiking soldier he had picked up to drive because he was too sleepy. He arrived in the Old City and after visiting quickly with his family, made his way to the wall. The space between the wall and the buildings in front of it was very narrow, so he lay down to get a shot of the wall itself, when the paratroopers walked by and he took several shots of them.

Twenty minutes later, IDF Chief Rabbi Shlomo Goren arrived on scene with a shofar and a Torah scroll, whereupon Goren was hoisted upon the shoulders of the soldiers. It was an emotional scene and Rubinger by far preferred his photograph of that, though his wife Anni told him "the one of the three soldiers" was better.

As part of his agreement with the Israeli Army allowing him front-line access, he turned the negatives over to the government, who distributed it to everyone for a mere IL2 each. It was then widely pirated as well. Although Rubinger was upset about his work being stolen, the photo's widespread distribution made it famous.

The image engenders such a strong emotional component that it has become an icon of Israel. Israeli Supreme Court Justice Misha'el Kheshin declared in 2001 that the photo had "become the property of the entire nation".

== Awards and recognition ==
David Rubinger was awarded the Israel Prize in communications for 1997, the first year it was awarded in that category. (His fellow laureate in communications was veteran television broadcaster Haim Yavin). He was the first photographer to receive the Israel Prize, as the category of Photography was not awarded until 2000.

On 5 March 2017, Israel's mass-circulation Hebrew-language daily Yedioth Ahronoth, for whom Rubinger had worked in the past, published a 21-page special photographic supplement in colour of selected photographs spanning his career. Titled "The Man Who Was There," the cover caption read: "There's no Israeli leader he didn't document or historic event where he wasn't present. To a great extent, David Rubinger, who passed away last week, is the photographer of our life here in Israel."

== See also ==
- Visual arts in Israel
- List of Israel Prize recipients
- Ami Rubinger
- Ze'ev Aleksandrowicz (1905–1992)
- Zoltan Kluger (1896–1977)
- Samuel Joseph Schweig
- Herbert Sonnenfeld (1906–1972)
- Rudi Weissenstein (1910–1999)
