= Zoltan Kluger =

Israeli photographer

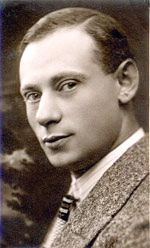
- Zoltan Kluger at the age of 25 in Budapest
- Born: 8 February 1896; Kecskemét, Austria-Hungary
- Died: 16 May 1977 (aged 81); Manhattan, United States
- Known for: Photography

Zoltan (Zvi) Kluger (Hebrew: זולטן קלוגר; February 8, 1896 – May 16, 1977) was an Austro-Hungarian born Israeli photographer. He is known as one of the most important photographers in Mandatory Palestine.

== Biography ==
=== Hungary and Germany ===
Zoltan Kluger was born in the city of Kecskemet in Hungary in 1896. During World War I he served as an airborne photographer in the Austro-Hungarian Aviation Troops. At the end of the 1920s he emigrated to Berlin, the capital of Germany, where he worked as a press photographer.

=== Mandatory Palestine (1933) ===
In April 1933, with the rise of the Nazis to power, he arrived in Palestine as a tourist, and then received a British certificate to stay, thanks to the intervention of Moshe Shertok (later Sharett). Later that year, Nachman Shifrin, whom Kluger had met in Berlin, founded the "East Photography Society for the Press" in Tel Aviv. In 1934 Kluger joined Shifrin and became a partner and chief photographer.

Kluger's prominent clients were the JNF and Keren Hayesod photography department, which sent Kluger to photograph economic enterprises and immigrants. In 1937 Kluger took a series of 250 aerial photographs, commissioned by Zalman Schocken. The book "Ella Pnei Israel" was published, in which Kluger's photographs are accompanied by a text by Moshe Shamir.

=== Private life; emigration to the US (1958) ===
Kluger married Sarah, and the two had a son, Paul, who was sent in 1950 by the Israeli Air Force to study in the United States and remained there. In 1958, Kluger and his wife immigrated to the United States following their son. His wife threatened to commit suicide if they didn't follow him. Kluger opened a photography shop in New York. At the same time, he made a living by filming events, mainly of the Hungarian community in New York.

Shortly after the couple arrived in the United States, his wife fell ill and died, and he remarried to Irena.

Kluger's mother and his sister Elsa survived the Holocaust in Hungary. His mother died in Hungary in 1949, while his sister, her husband, daughter, daughter's husband and their children emigrated to the United States in 1956 and settled in California. Kluger and his sister renewed their relationship. Kluger remained in the United States until his death.

== Estate ==
Zoltan Kluger died in Manhattan, New York in 1977. At his departure from Israel, he left behind a total of some 50,000 negatives, which were distributed among several public archives, including the Keren Hayesod collection in the Central Zionist Archives, the Jewish National Fund collection, the Government Press Office, the State Archives and the IDF Archives. In 1968, a collection of about 40,000 negatives from the years 1933-1948 came to the State Archives, and in 2017 the entire collection was uploaded to the State Archives, which includes a useful search engine for pictures.

== Exhibitions ==
Zoltan Kluger works have been exhibited in museums and galleries in Israel, including the Israel Museum. In 2008, the first solo exhibition of Zoltan Kluger was held at the Eretz Israel Museum in Tel Aviv. The exhibition was named "Zoltan Kluger - Principal Photographer, 1958-1933", curated by Dr. Ruth Oren and Guy Raz.

== Gallery ==
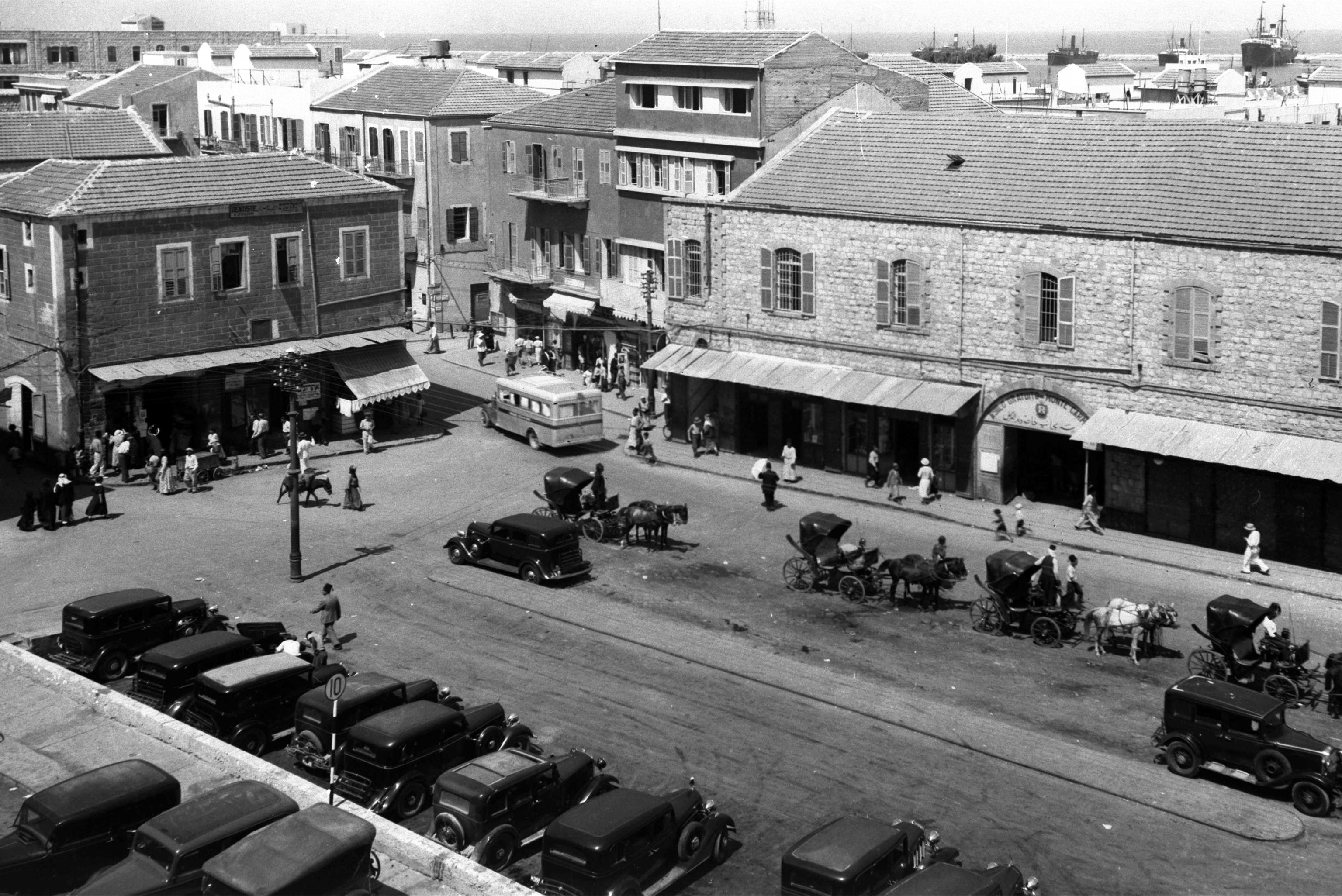
Haifa in 1934

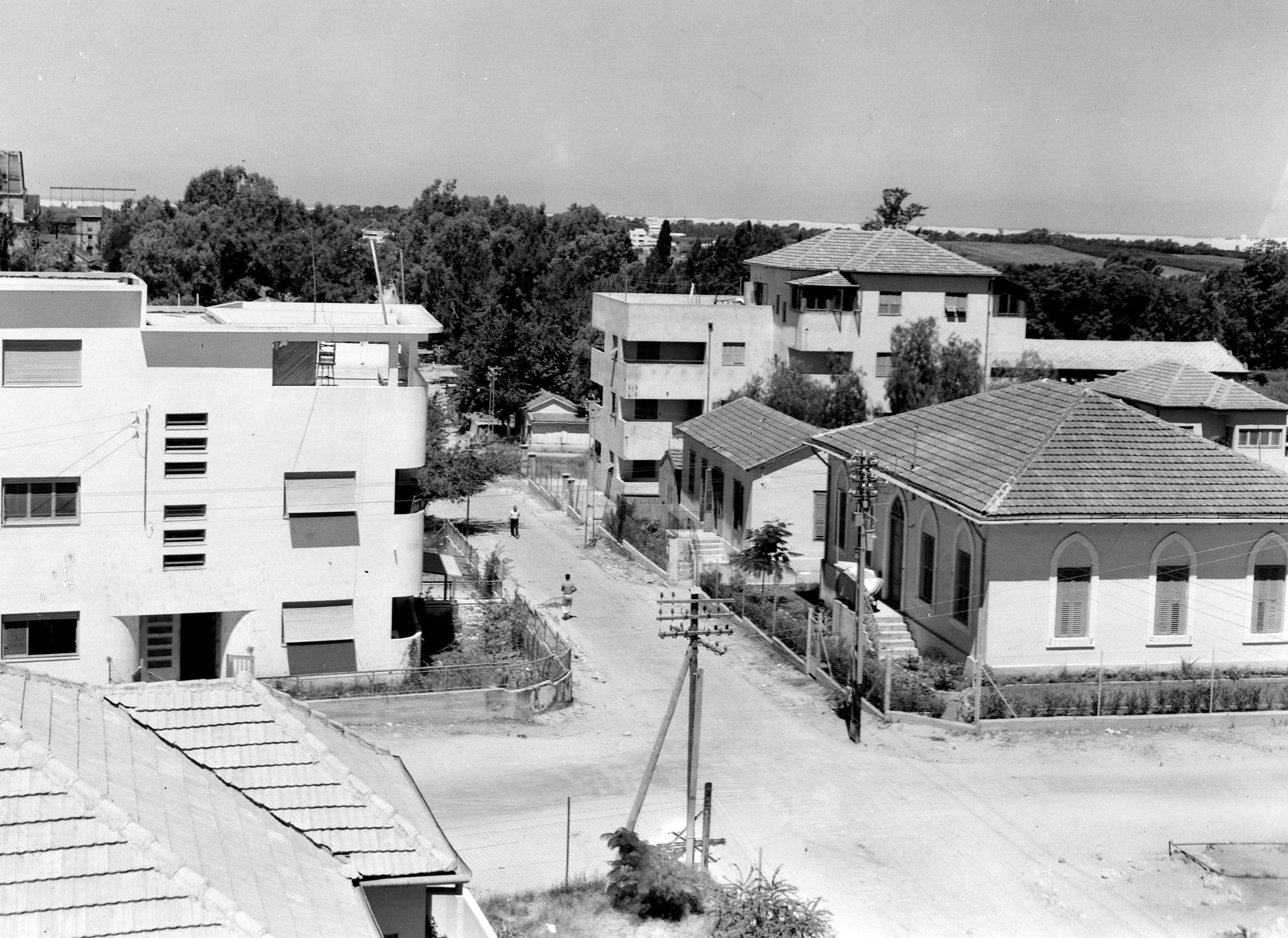
Nordau Street, Rishon LeZion, 1939

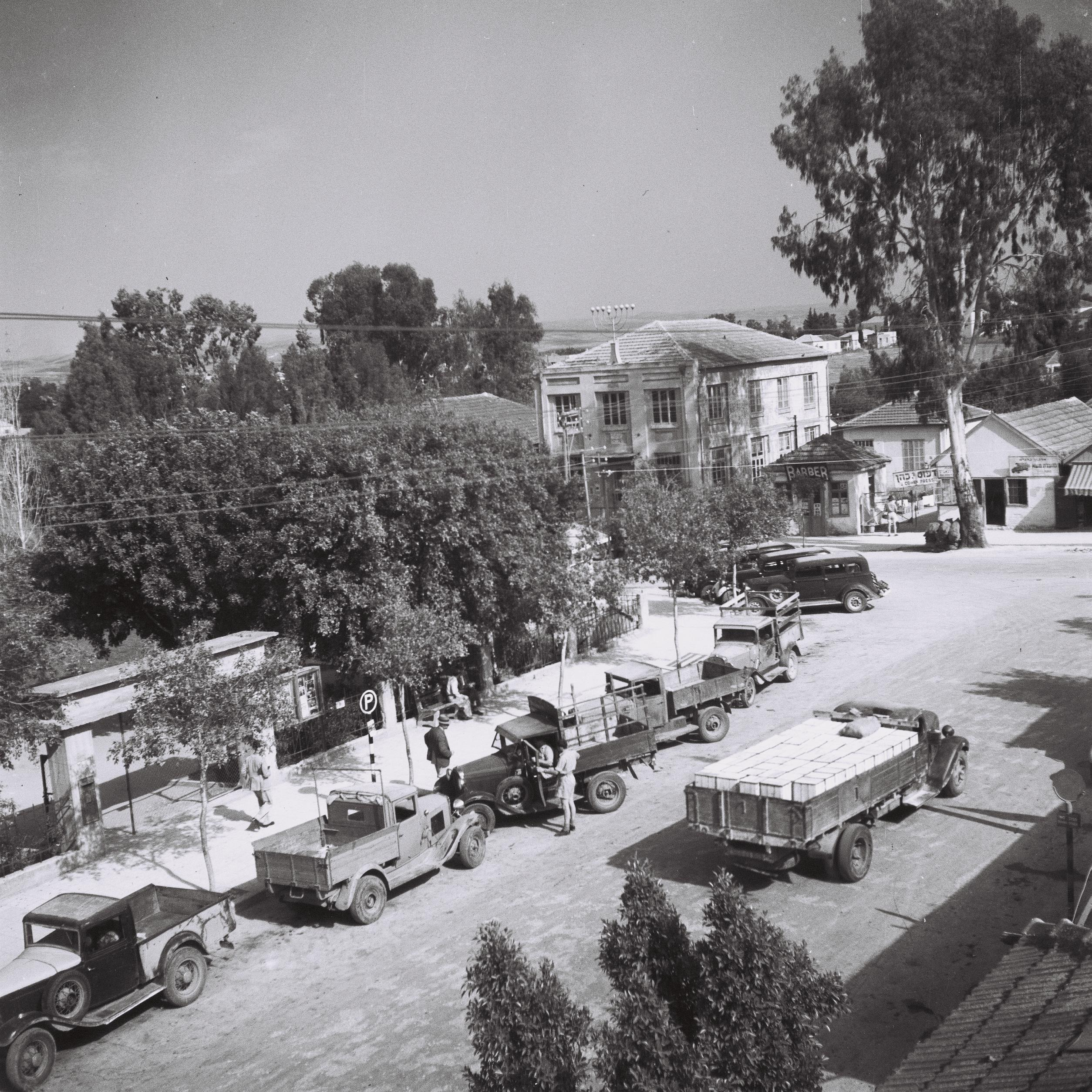
Petah Tikva in 1936

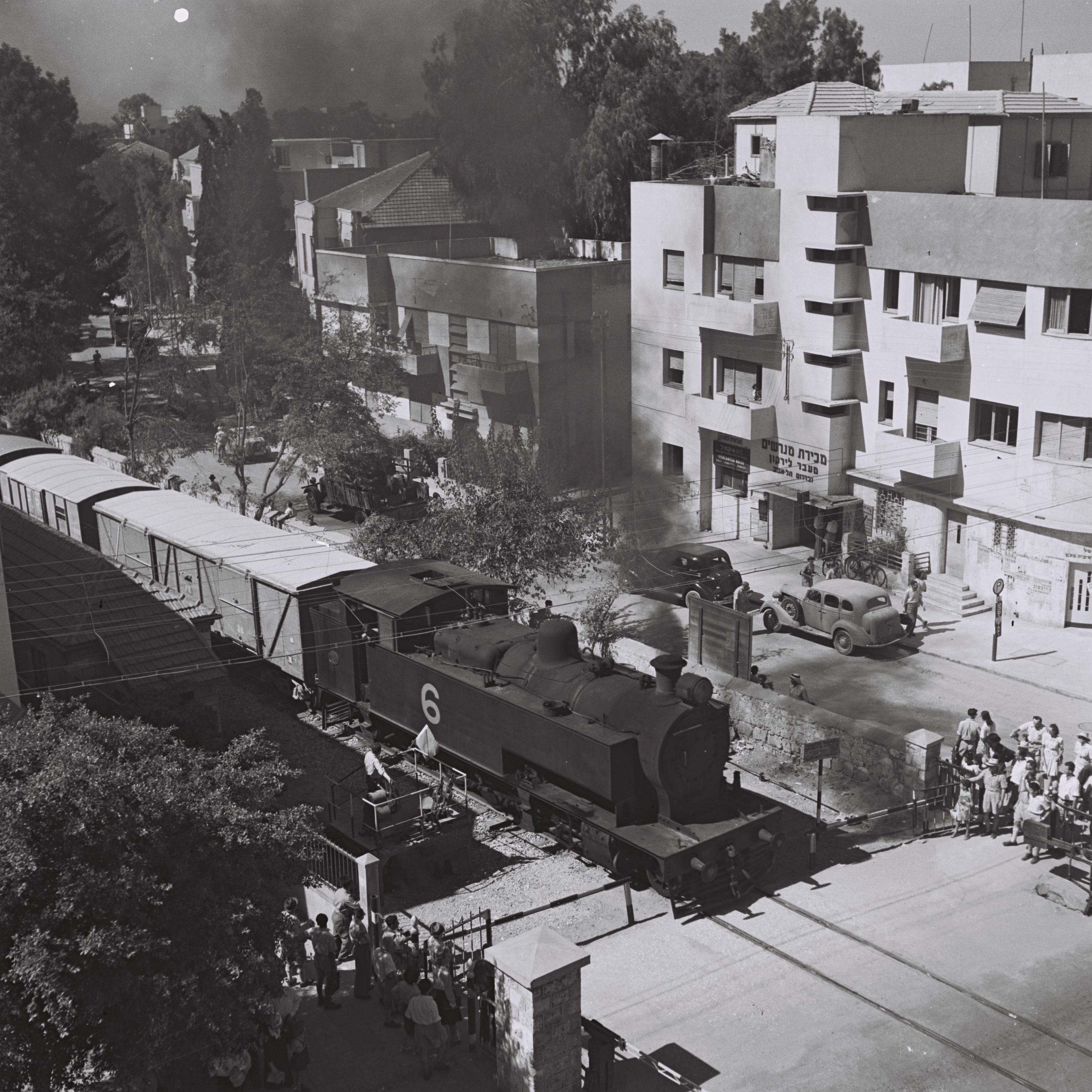
A freight train on Yehuda Halevi Street in Tel Aviv, 1946

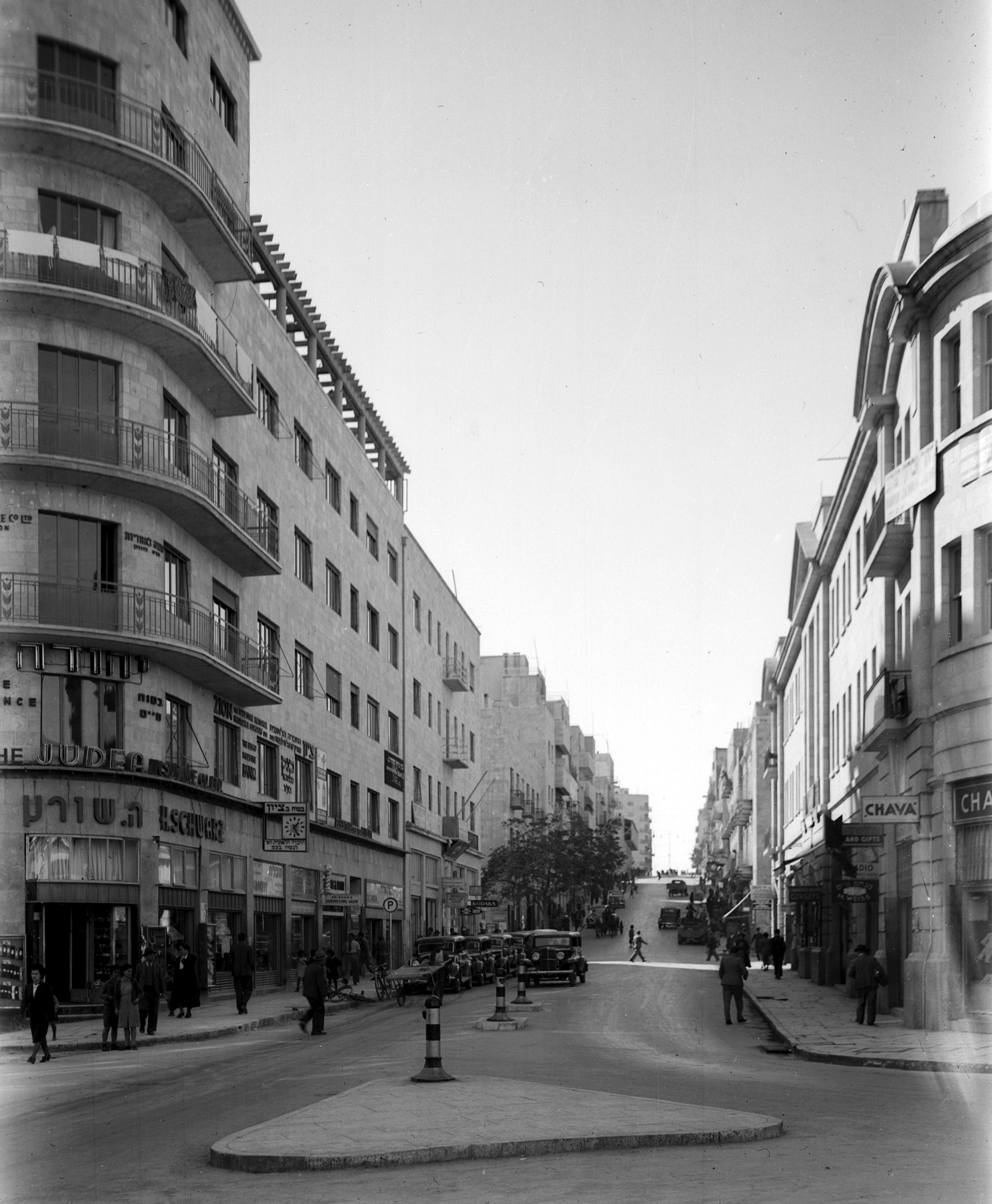
Ben Yehuda Street in Jerusalem, 1938

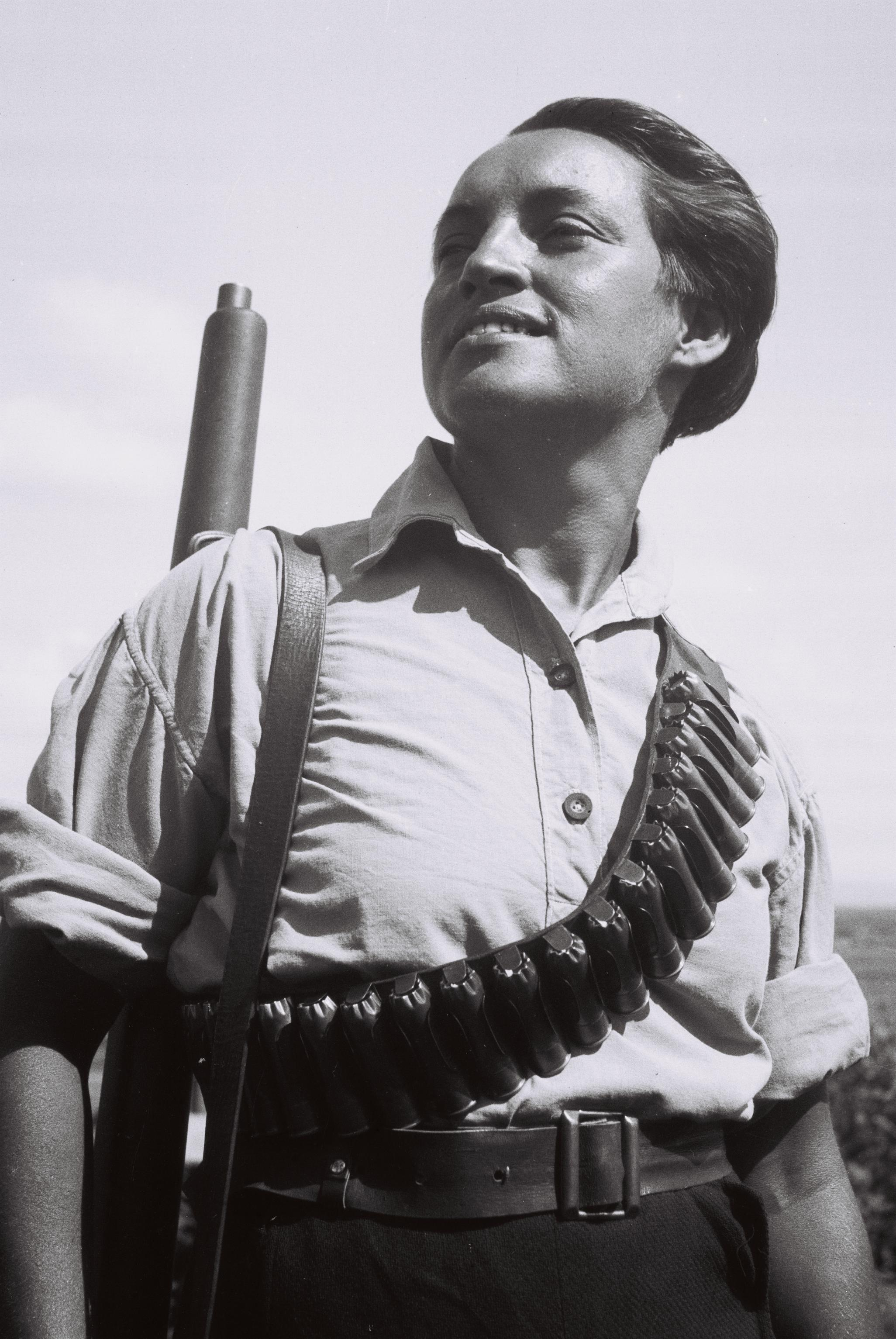
A female member of kibbutz Ma'abarot on guard duty, 1936

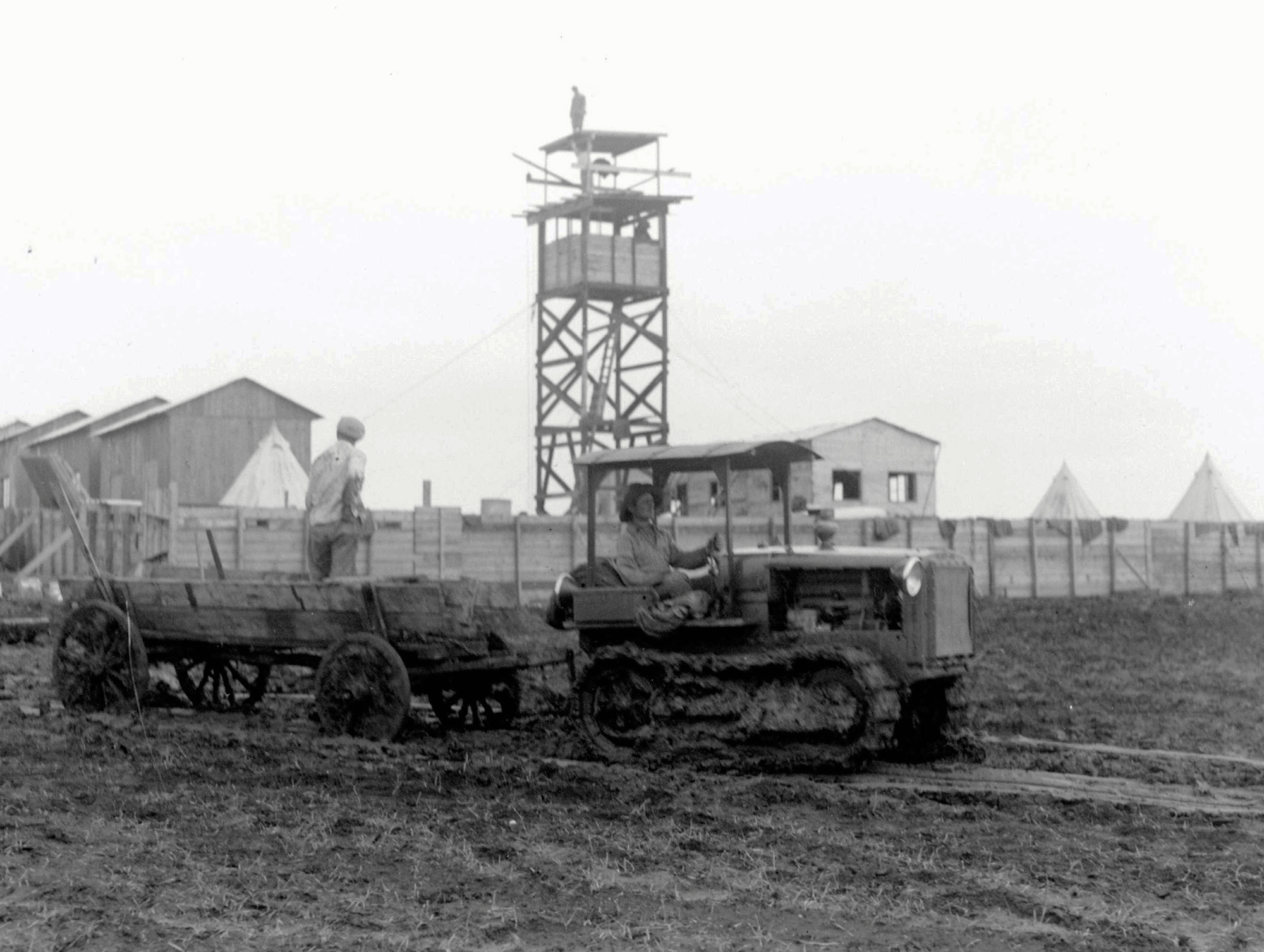
Kibbutz Sde Nahum in 1937

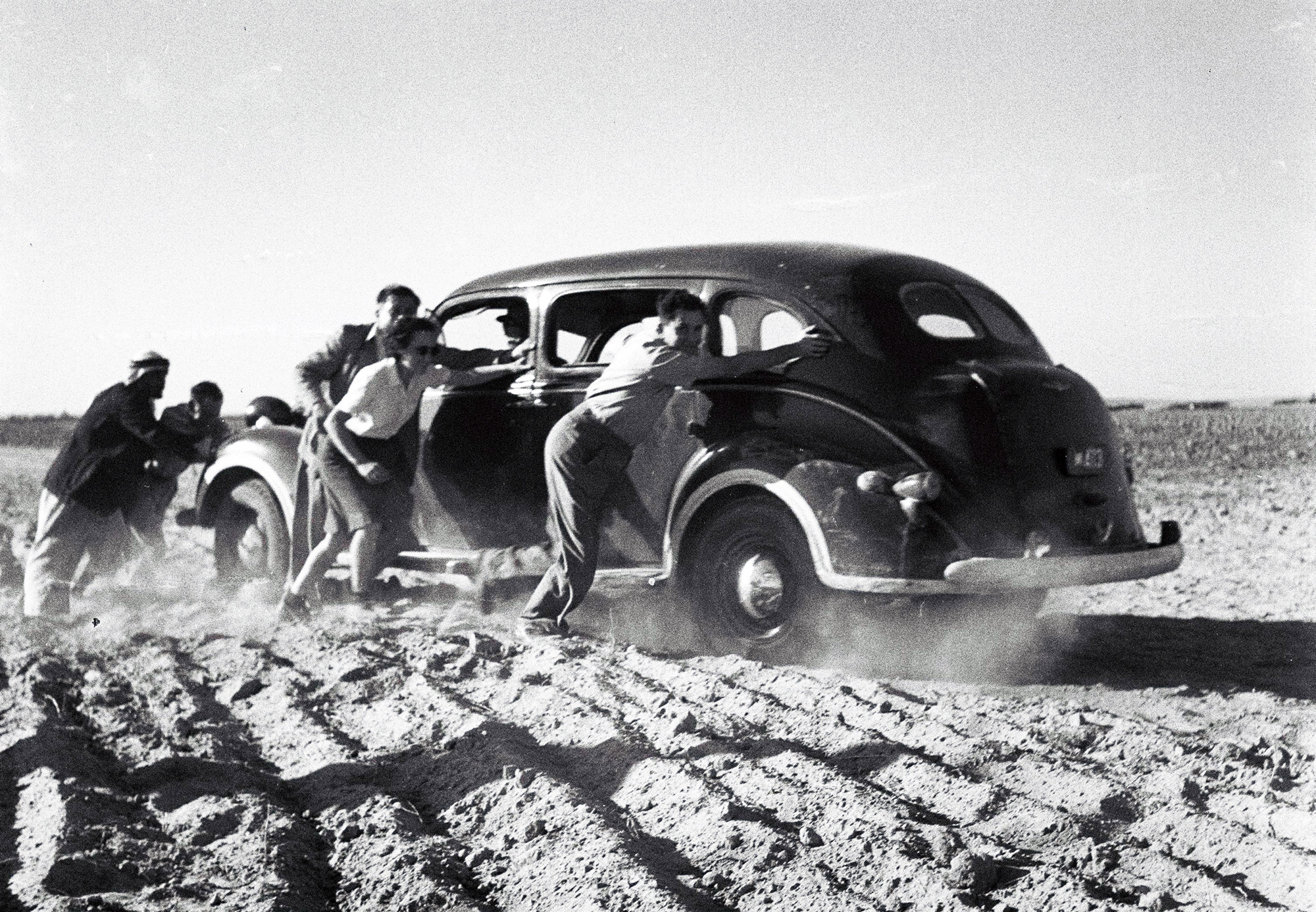
Members of kibbutz Revivim helping push a taxi out of the sand, 1943

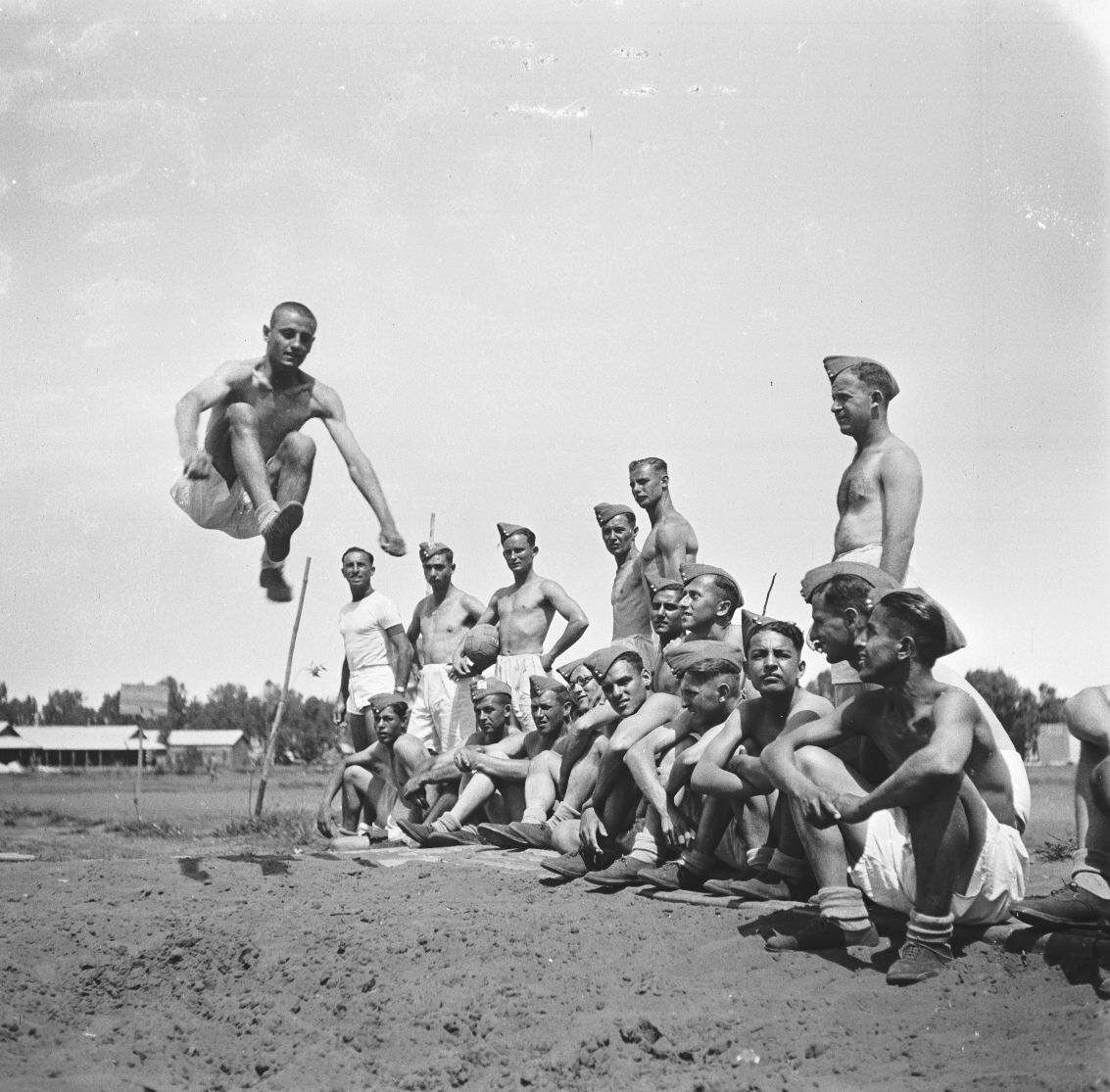
Buffs, 10th company

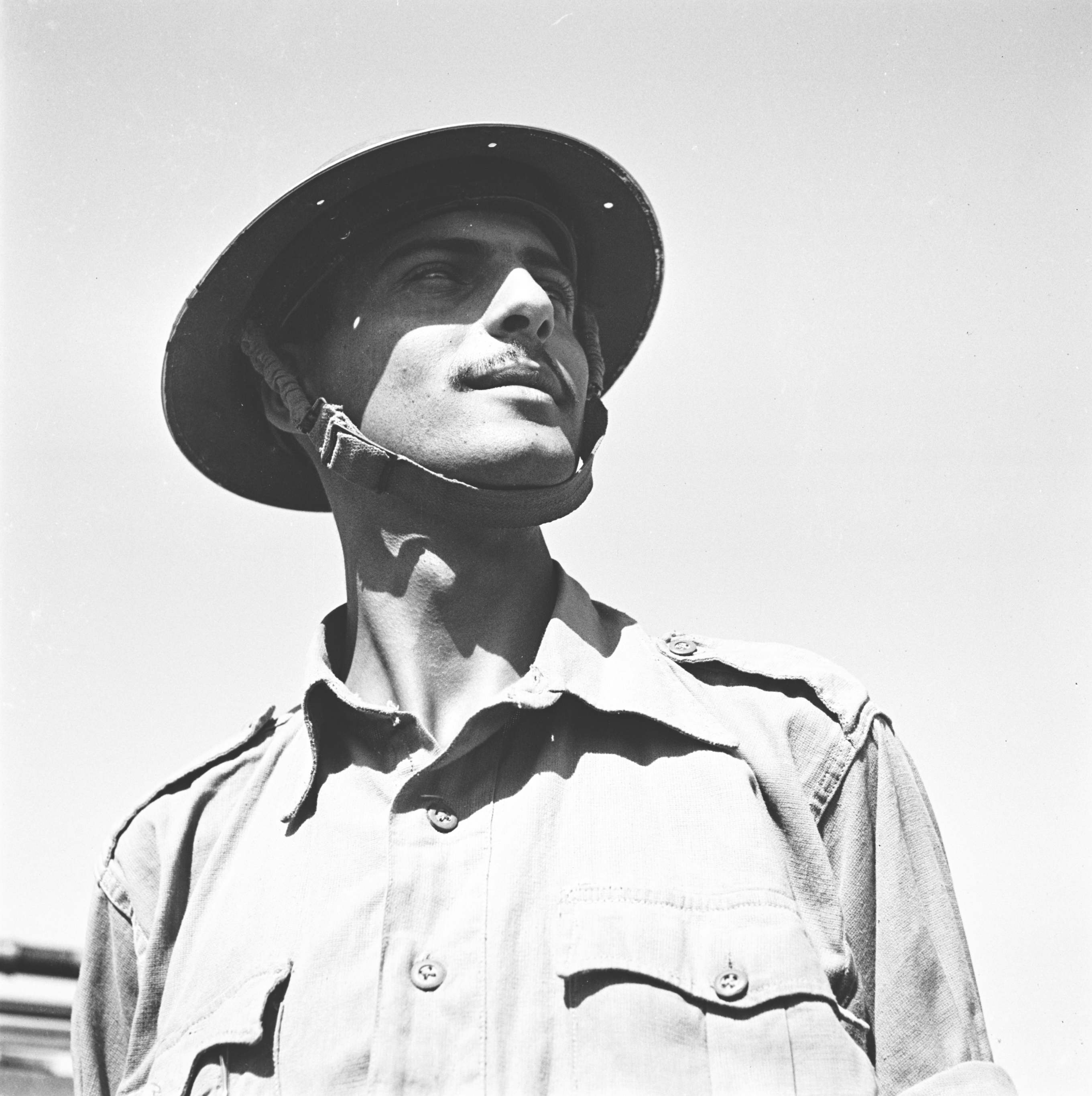
14th Regiment Coast Battery, Royal Artillery, Haifa

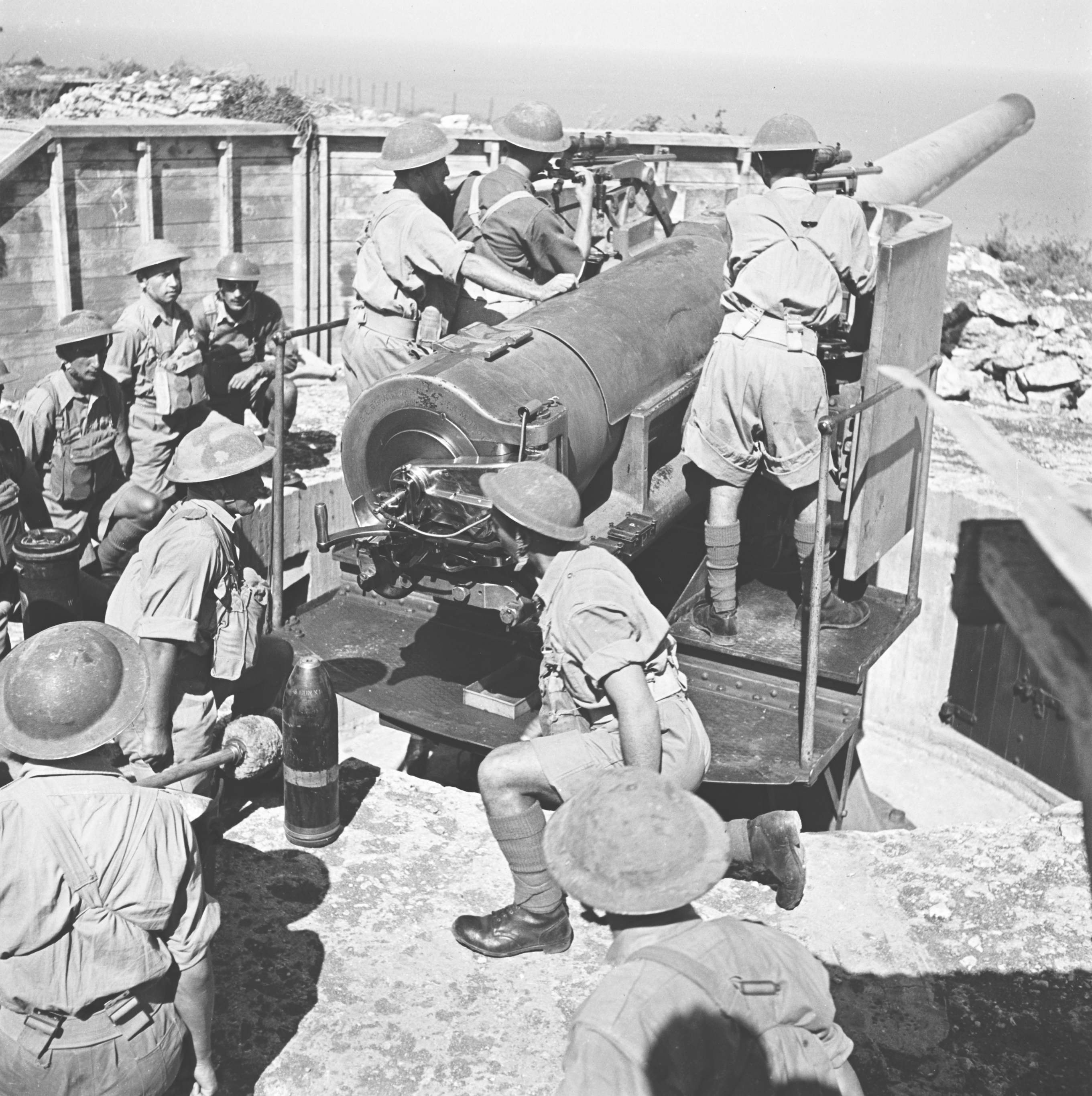
14th Regiment Coast Battery, Royal Artillery, Haifa

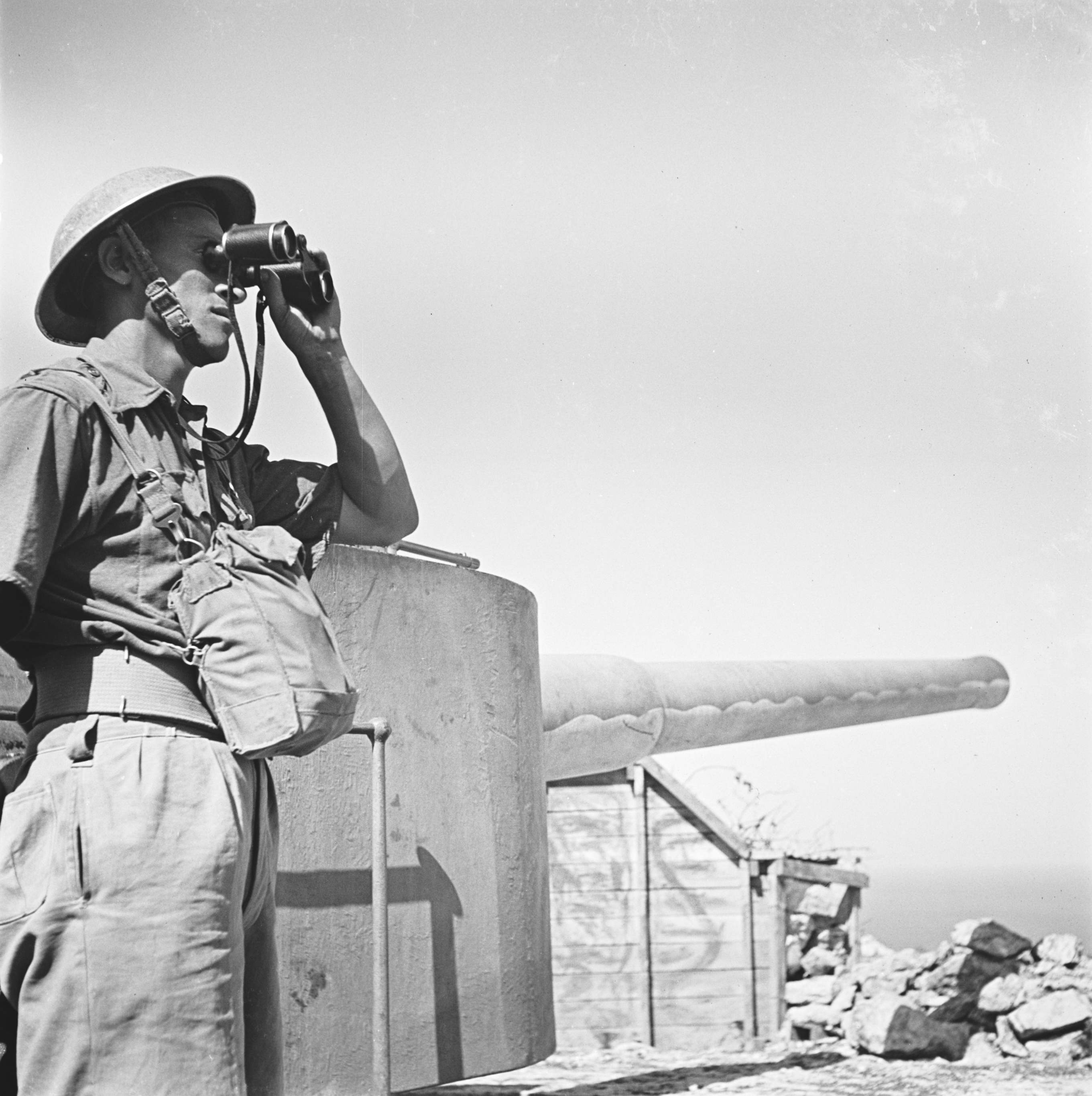
14th Regiment Coast Battery, Royal Artillery, Haifa

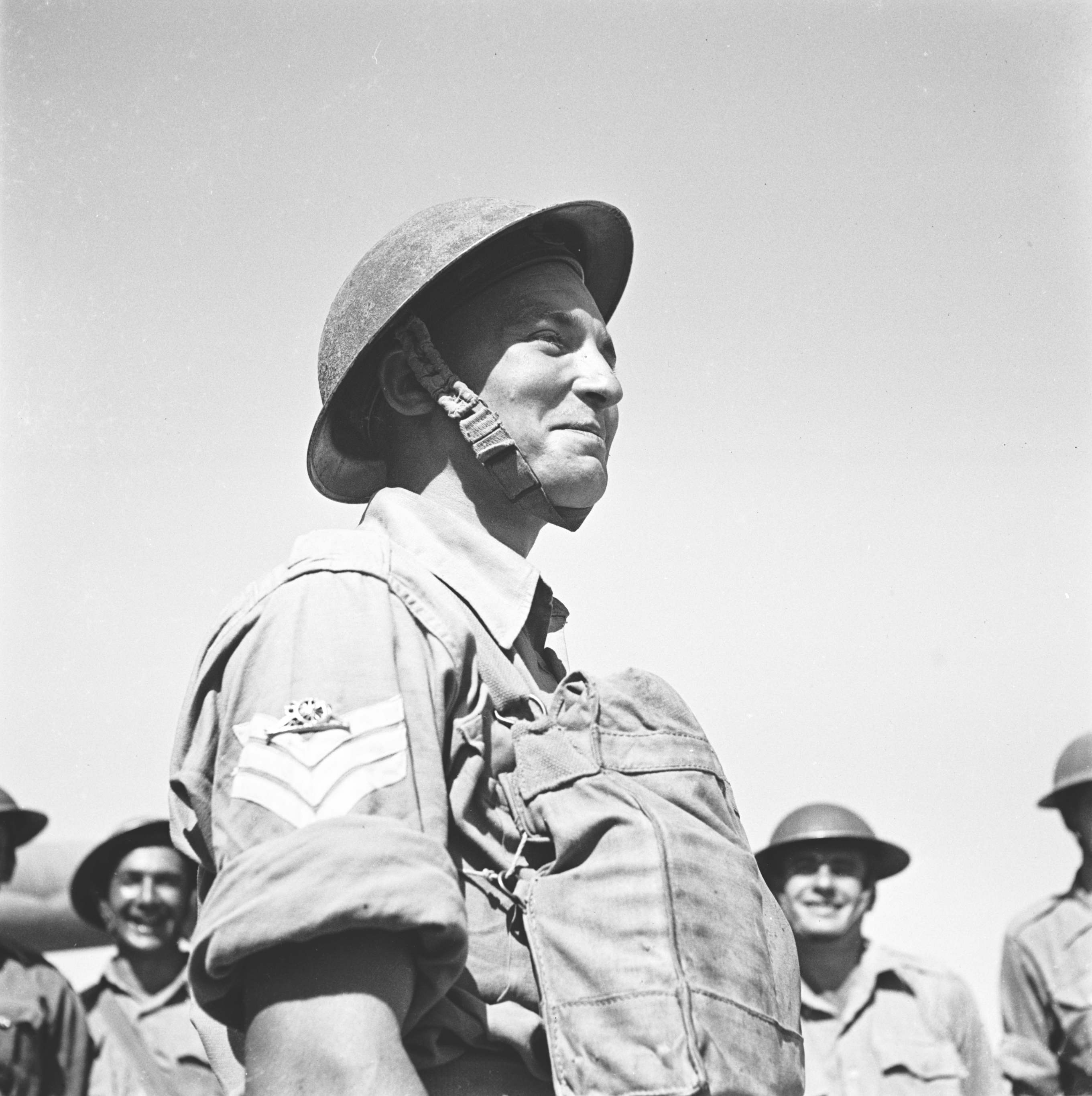
14th Regiment Coast Battery, Royal Artillery, Haifa

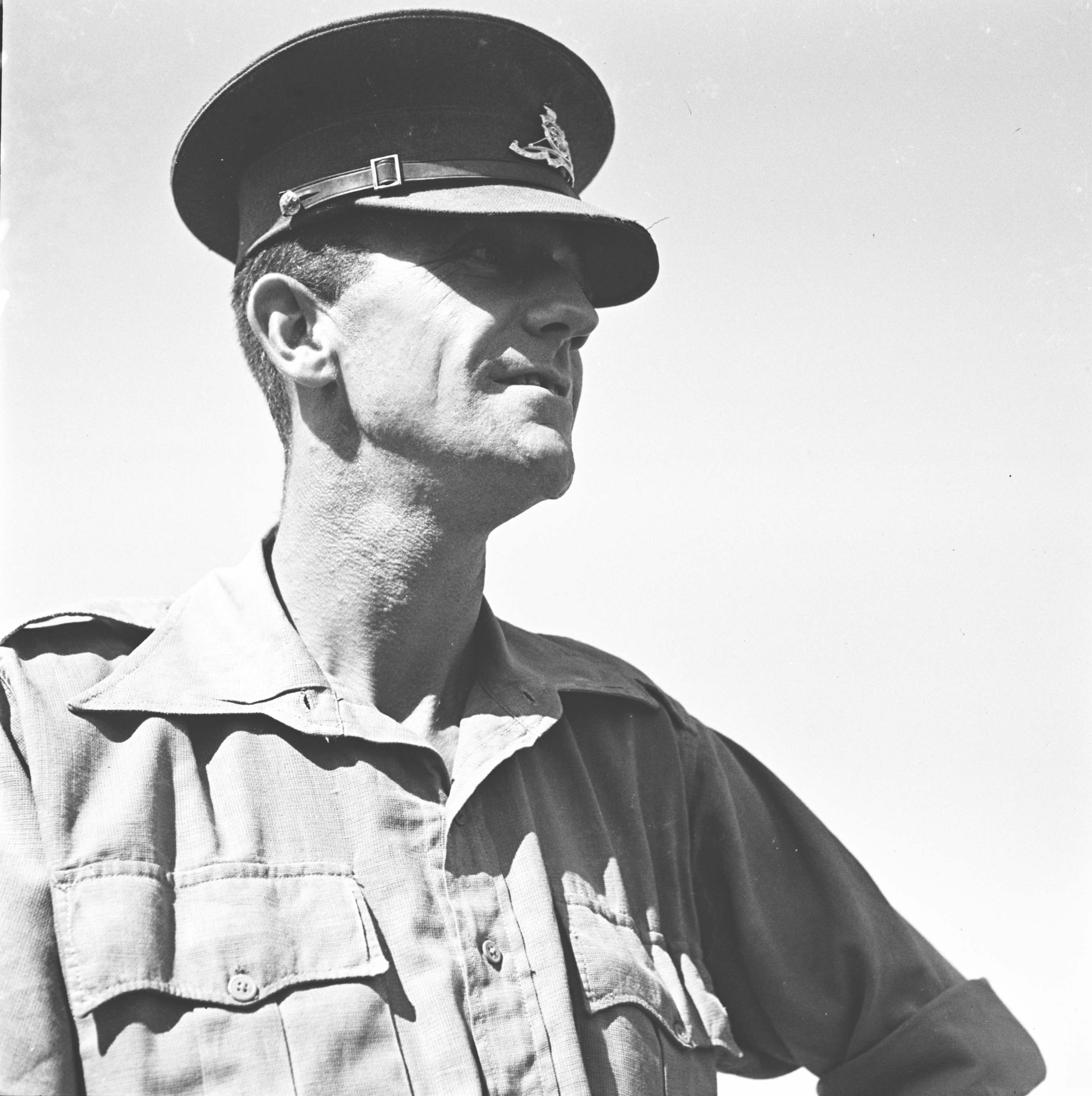
14th Regiment Coast Battery, Royal Artillery, Haifa

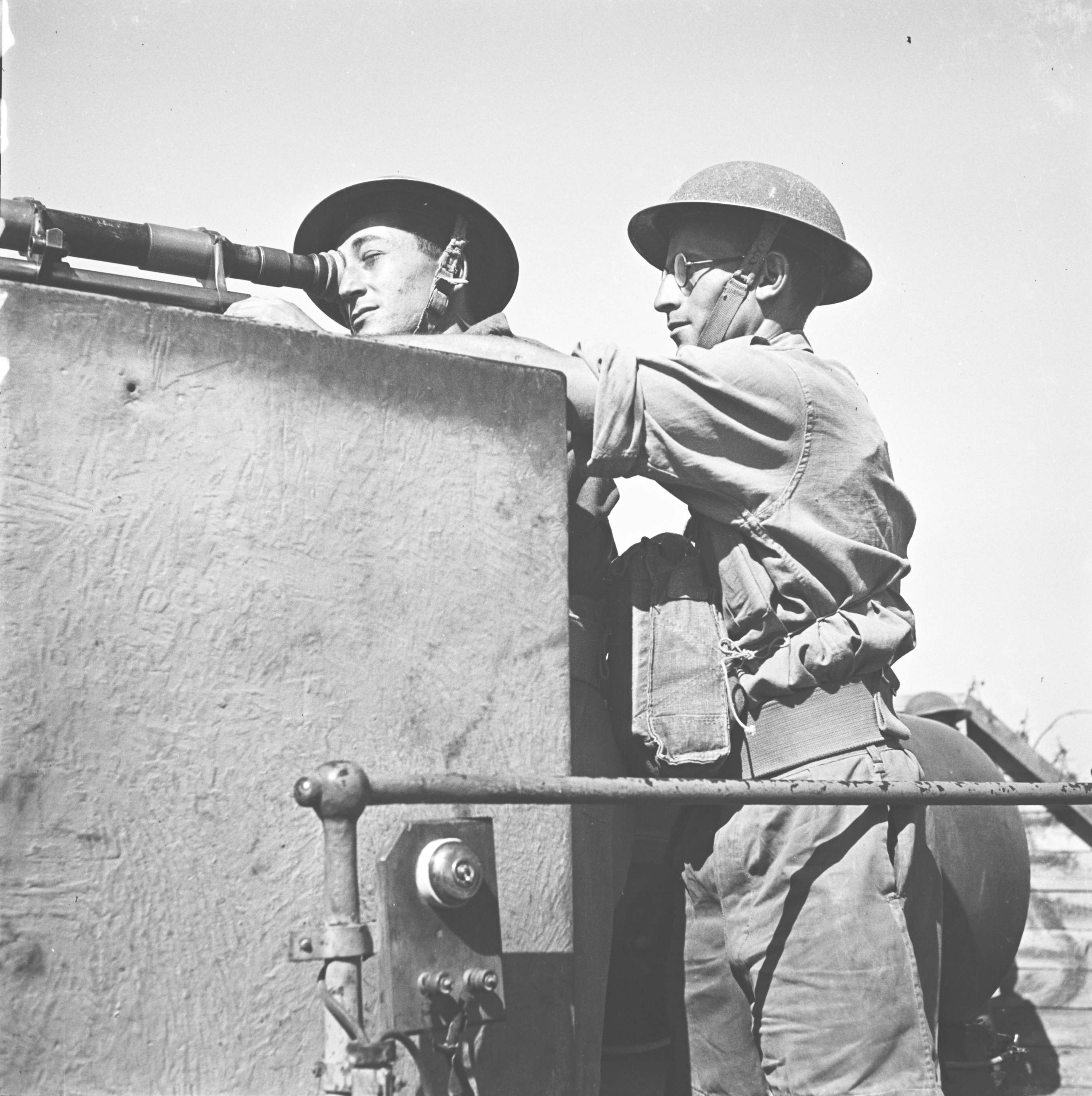
14th Regiment Coast Battery, Royal Artillery, Haifa

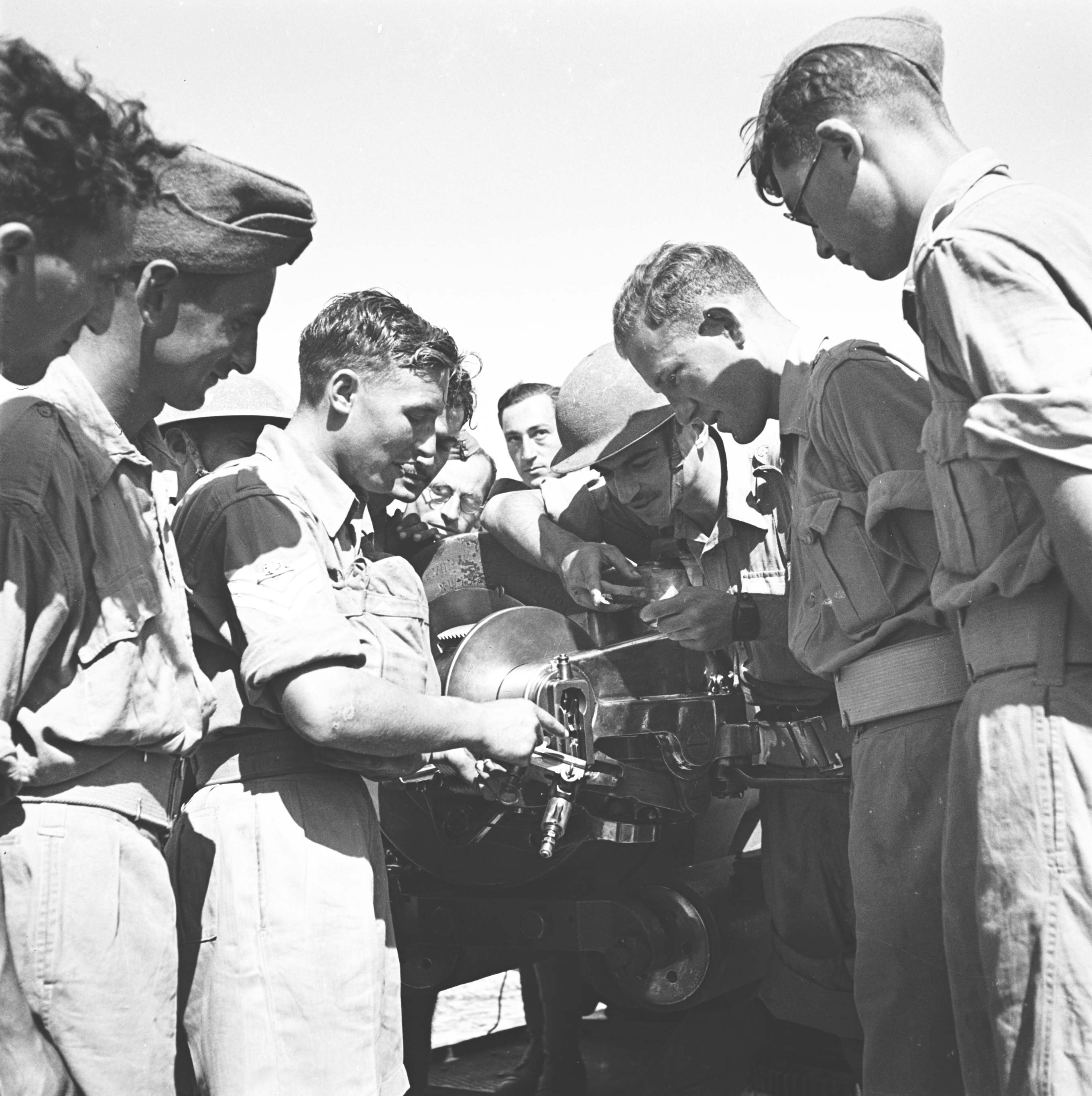
14th Regiment Coast Battery, Royal Artillery, Haifa

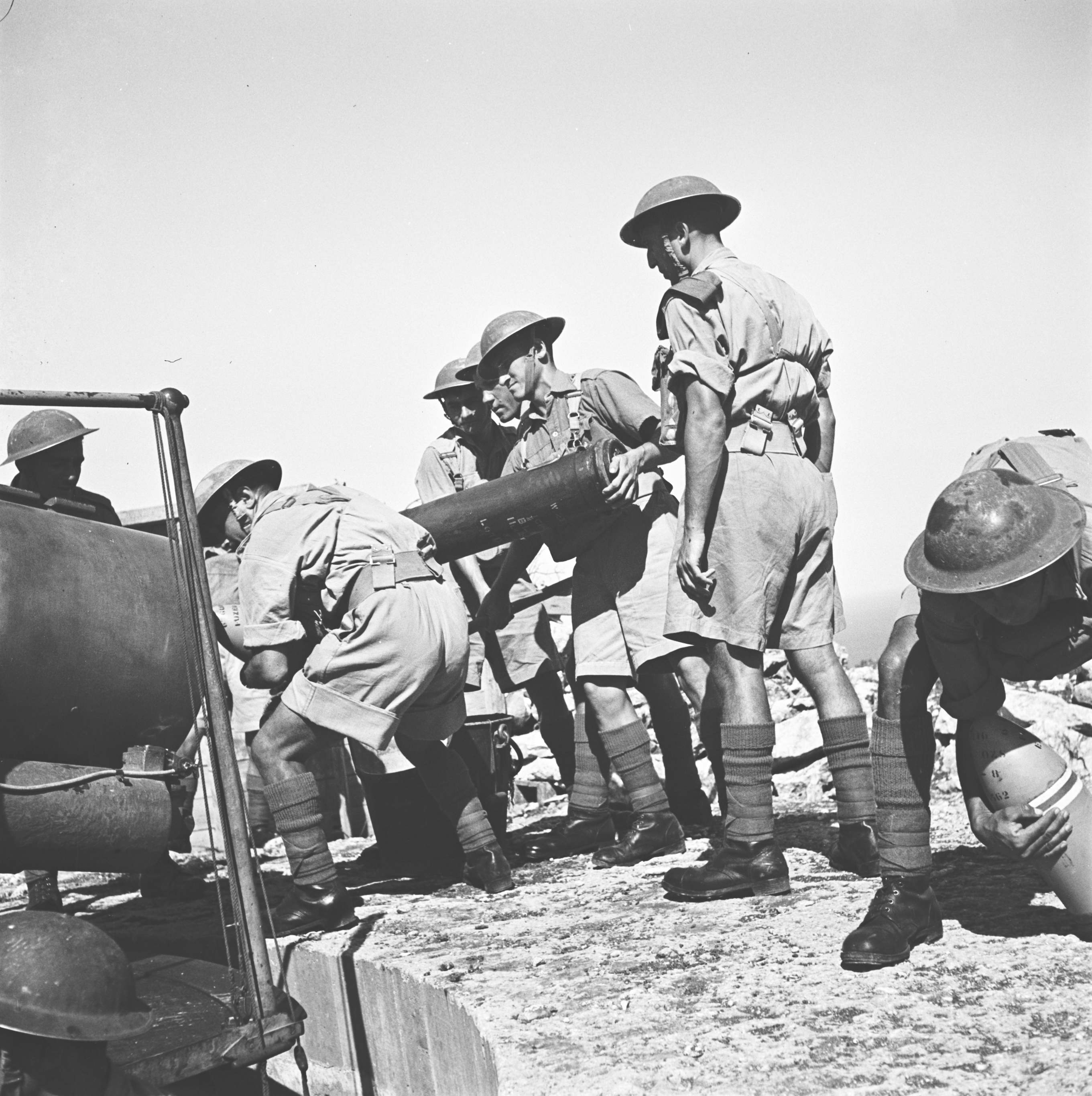
14th Regiment Coast Battery, Royal Artillery, Haifa

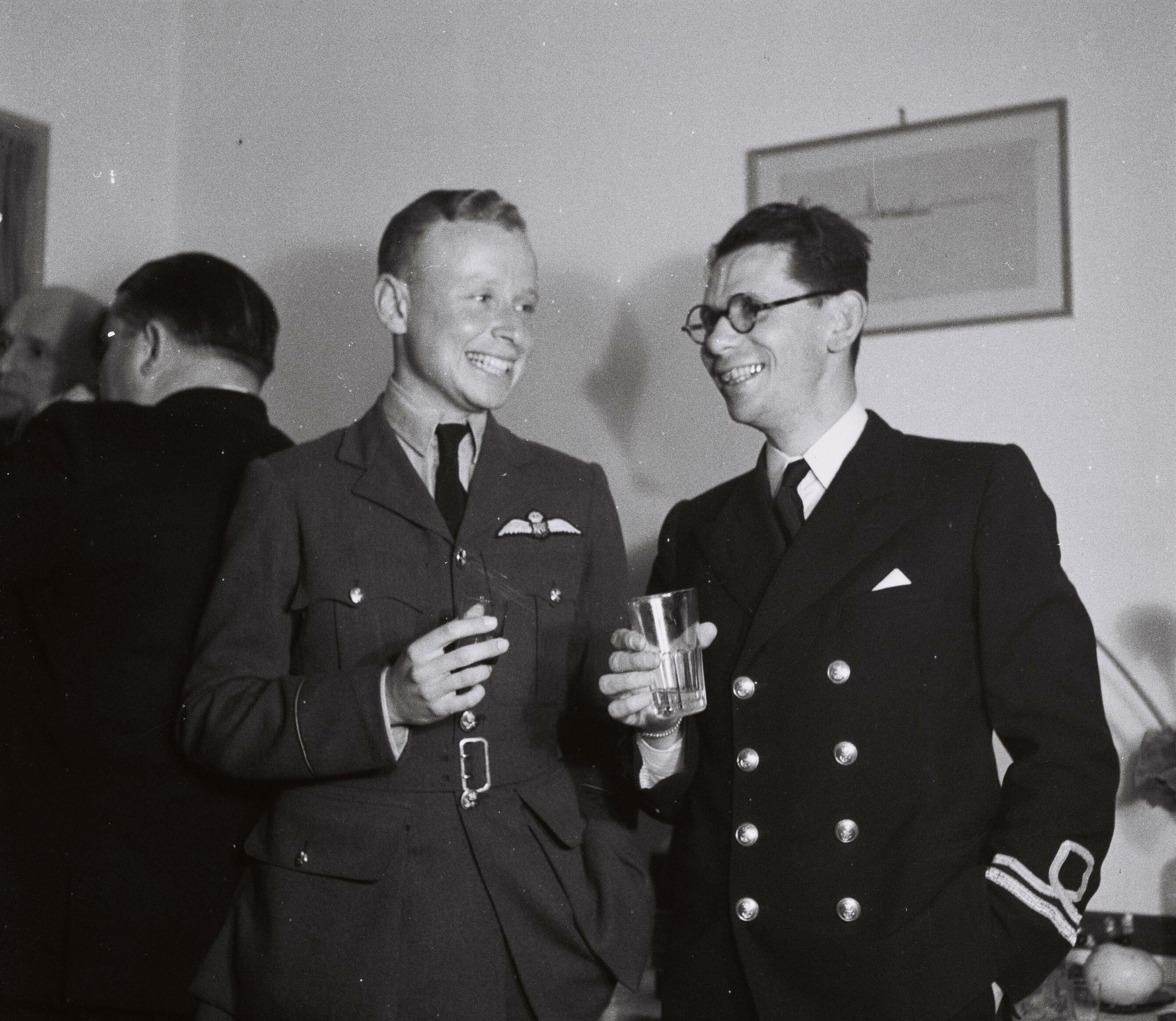
RAF pilot officer and future Israeli Air Force commander Dan Tolkowsky, left, with a merchant marine officer at the Jewish sailors' club in Haifa, March 1944

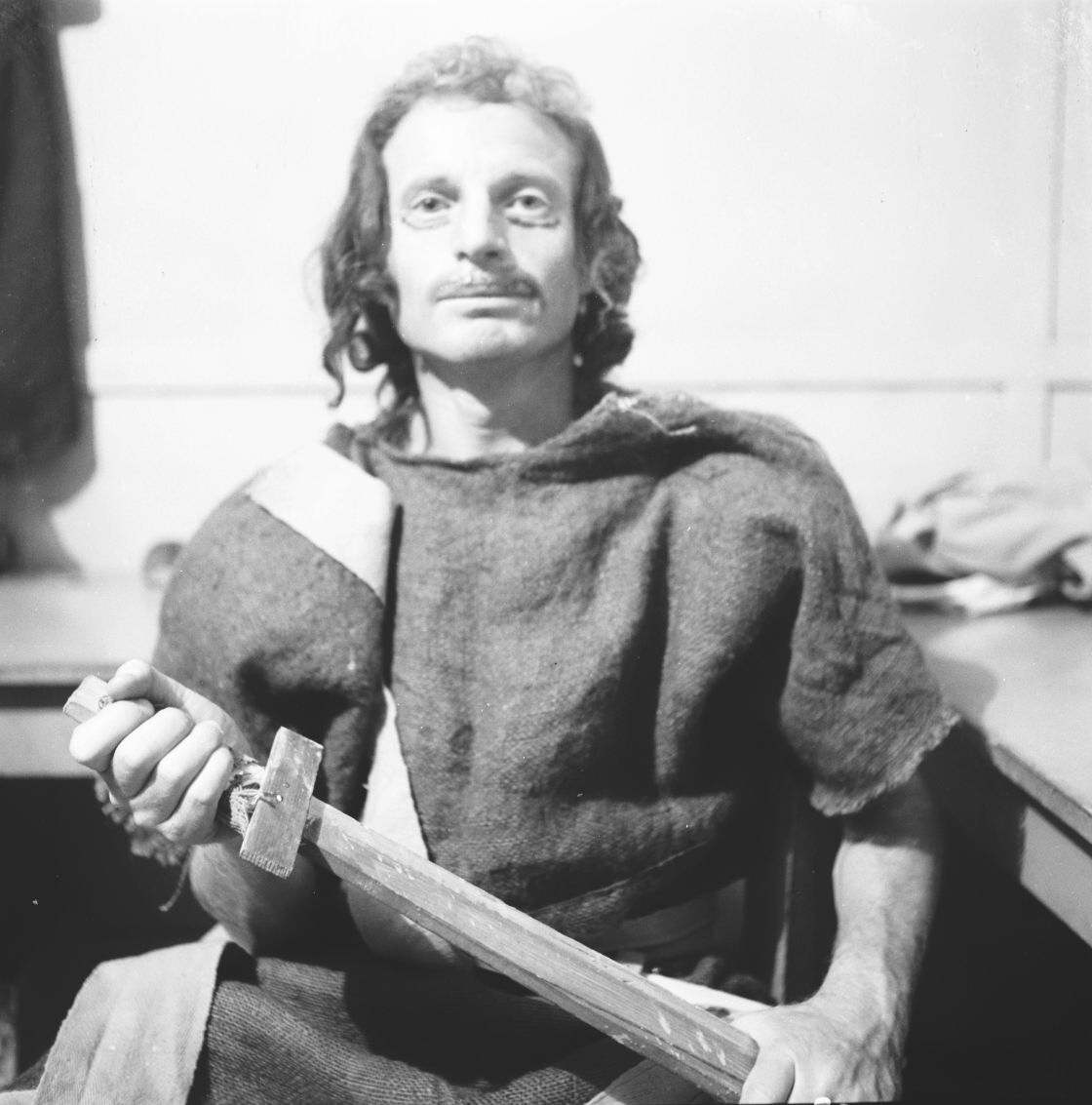
20 Years to the Maabarot - The Song of Songs Play

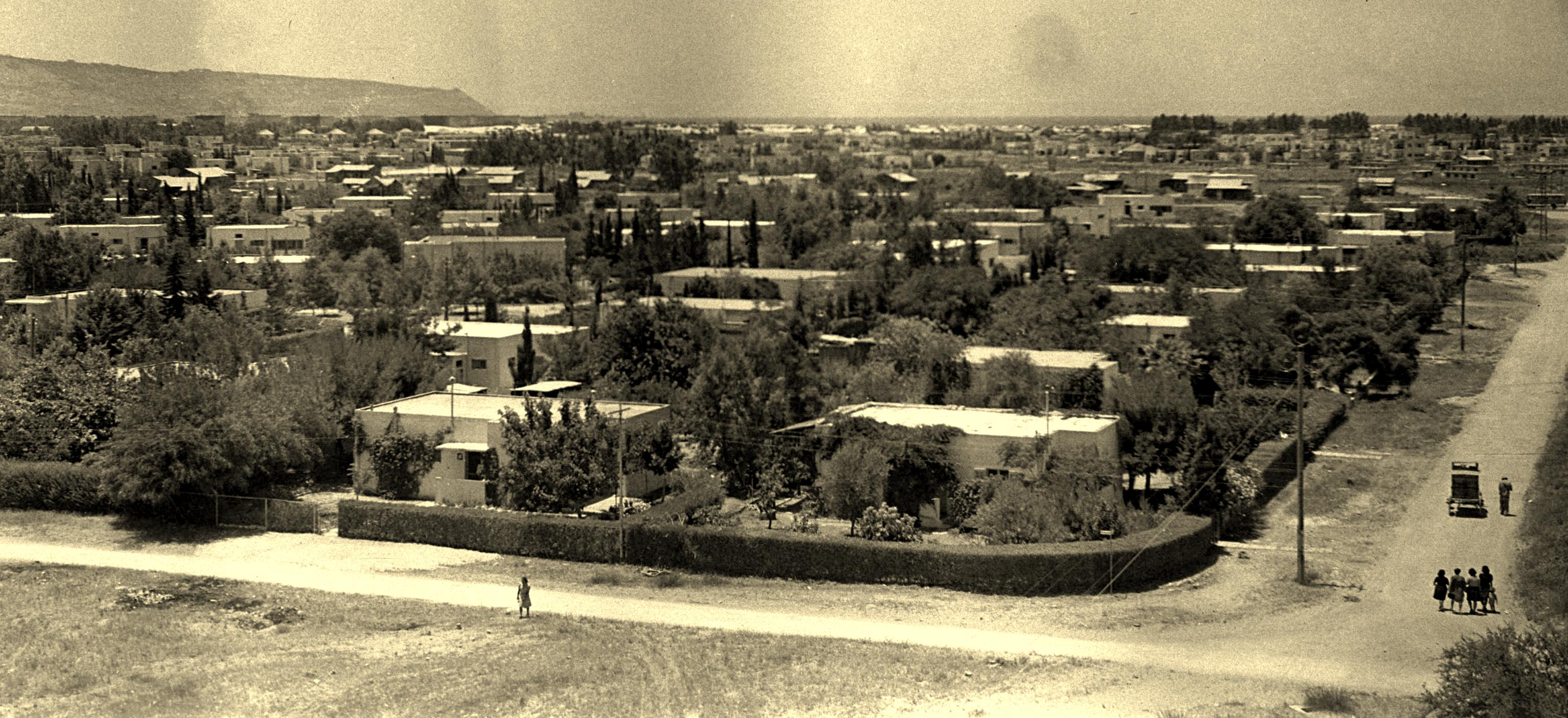
Kiryat Bialik in 1944

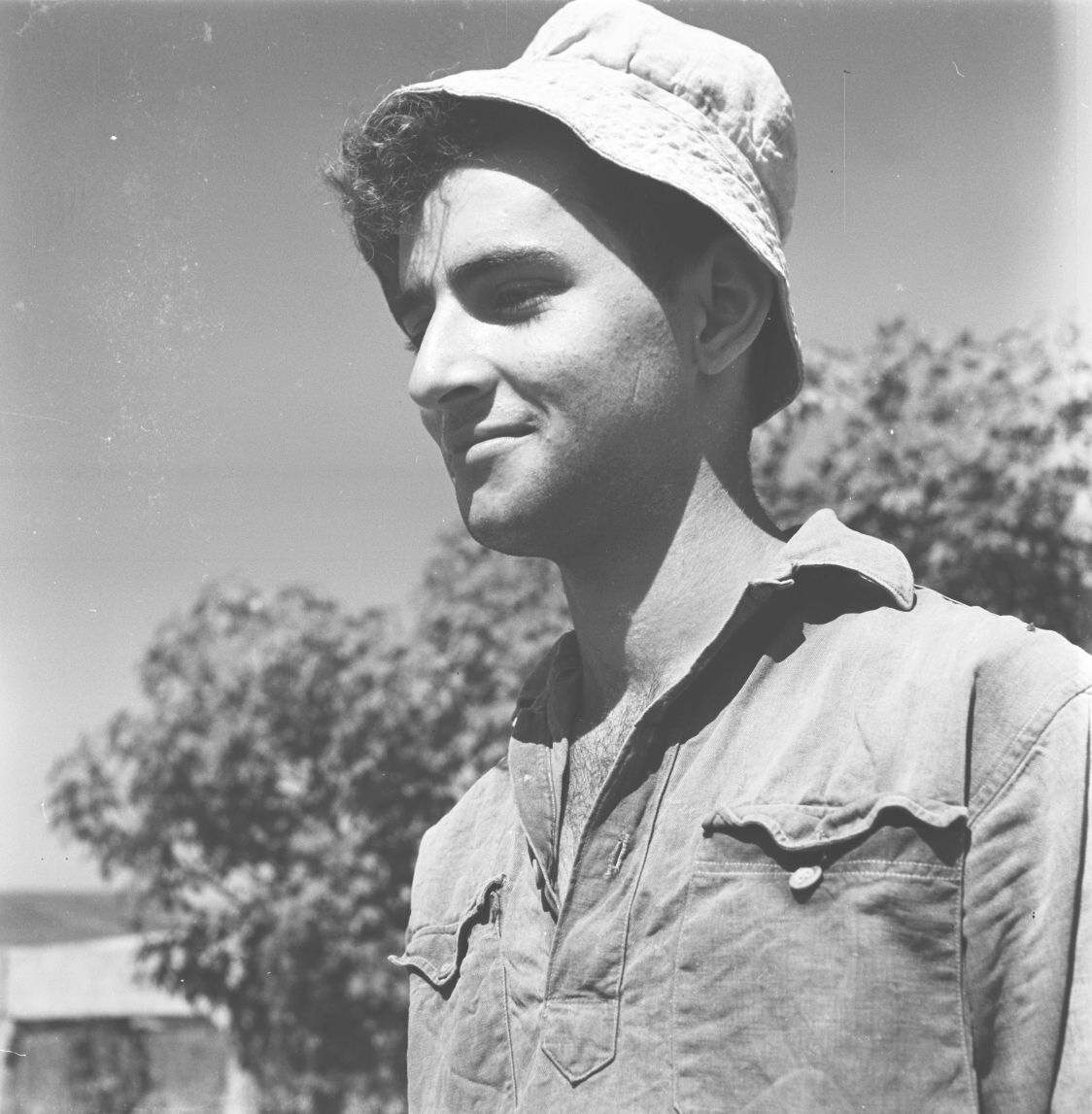
A native of Degania Bet during celebrations of the 25th anniversary of the kibbutz's founding, 1945

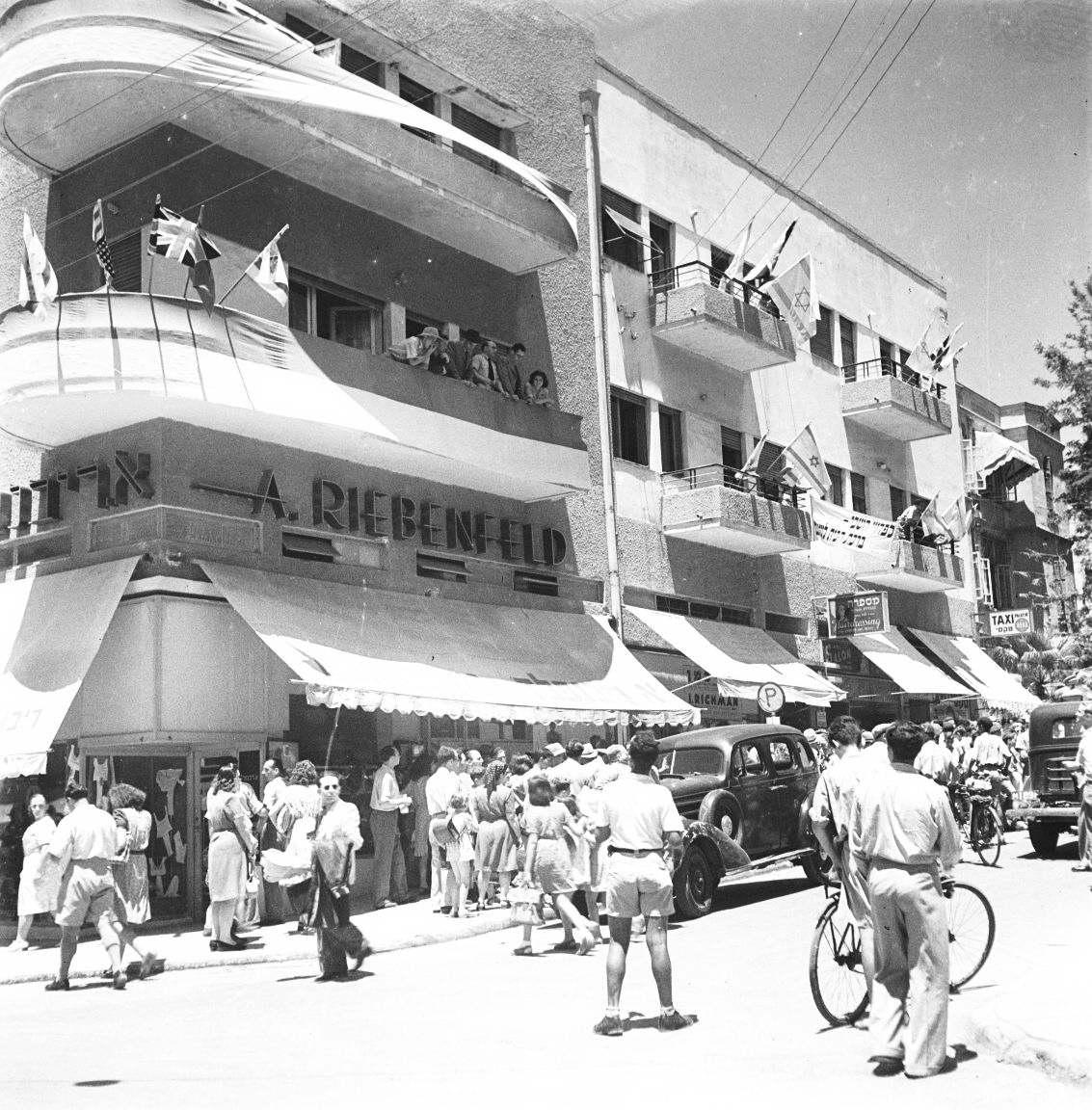
Tel Aviv, 1945. Jewish soldiers from Palestine in the British Army who had been taken prisoner by the Germans returning home

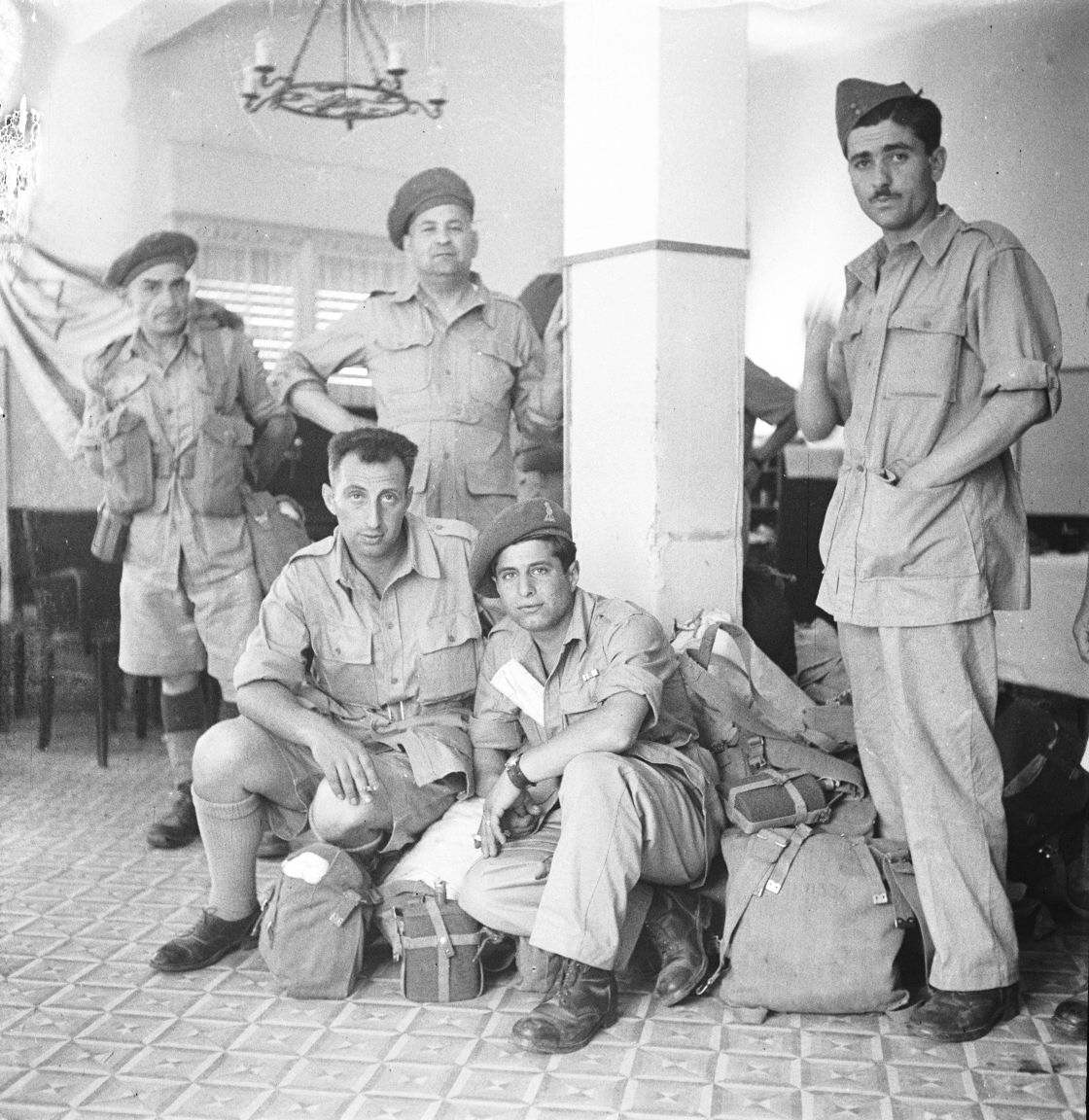
Jewish soldiers from Palestine who had been POWs in German captivity returning home

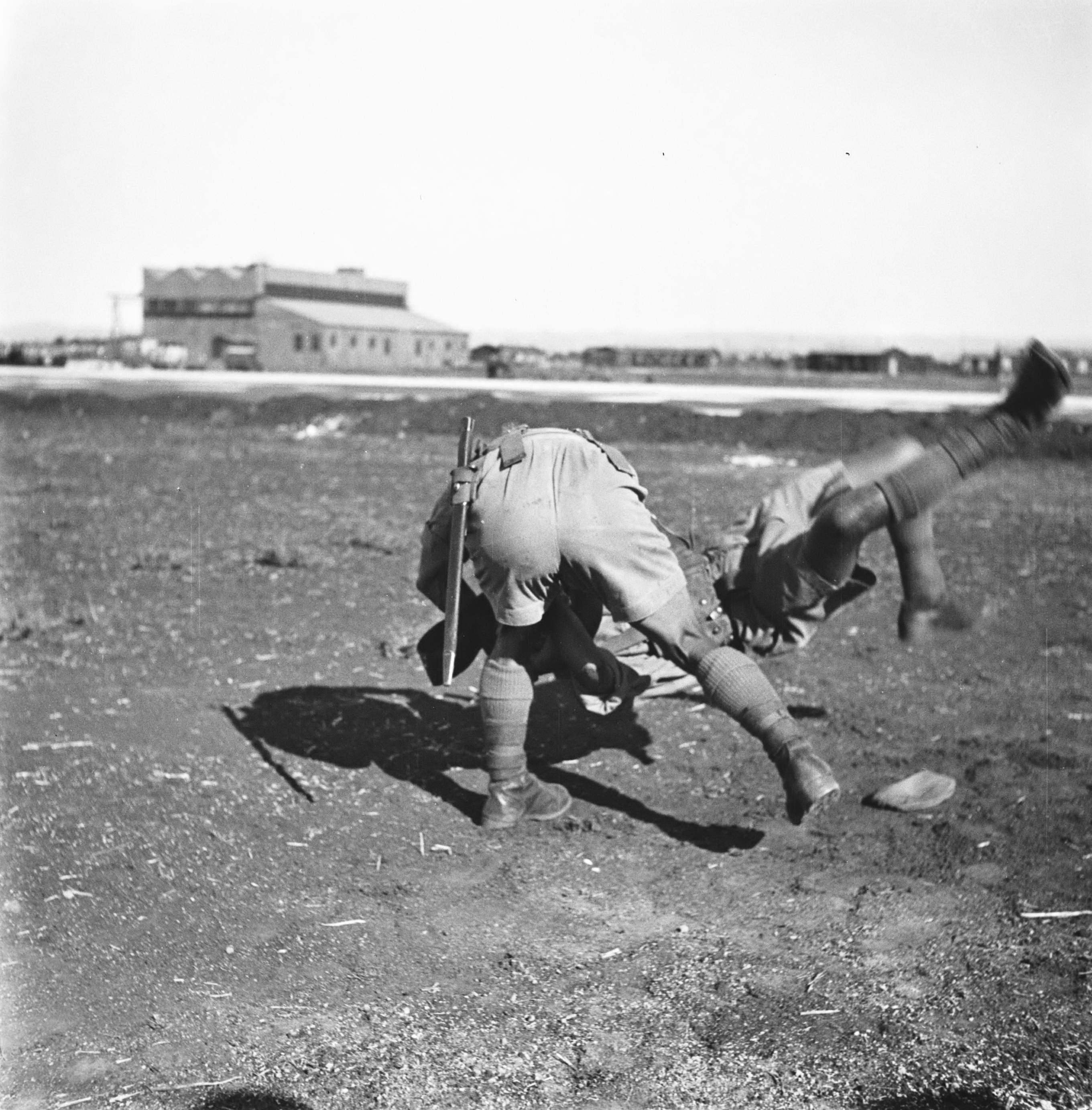
Buffs, 6th Company

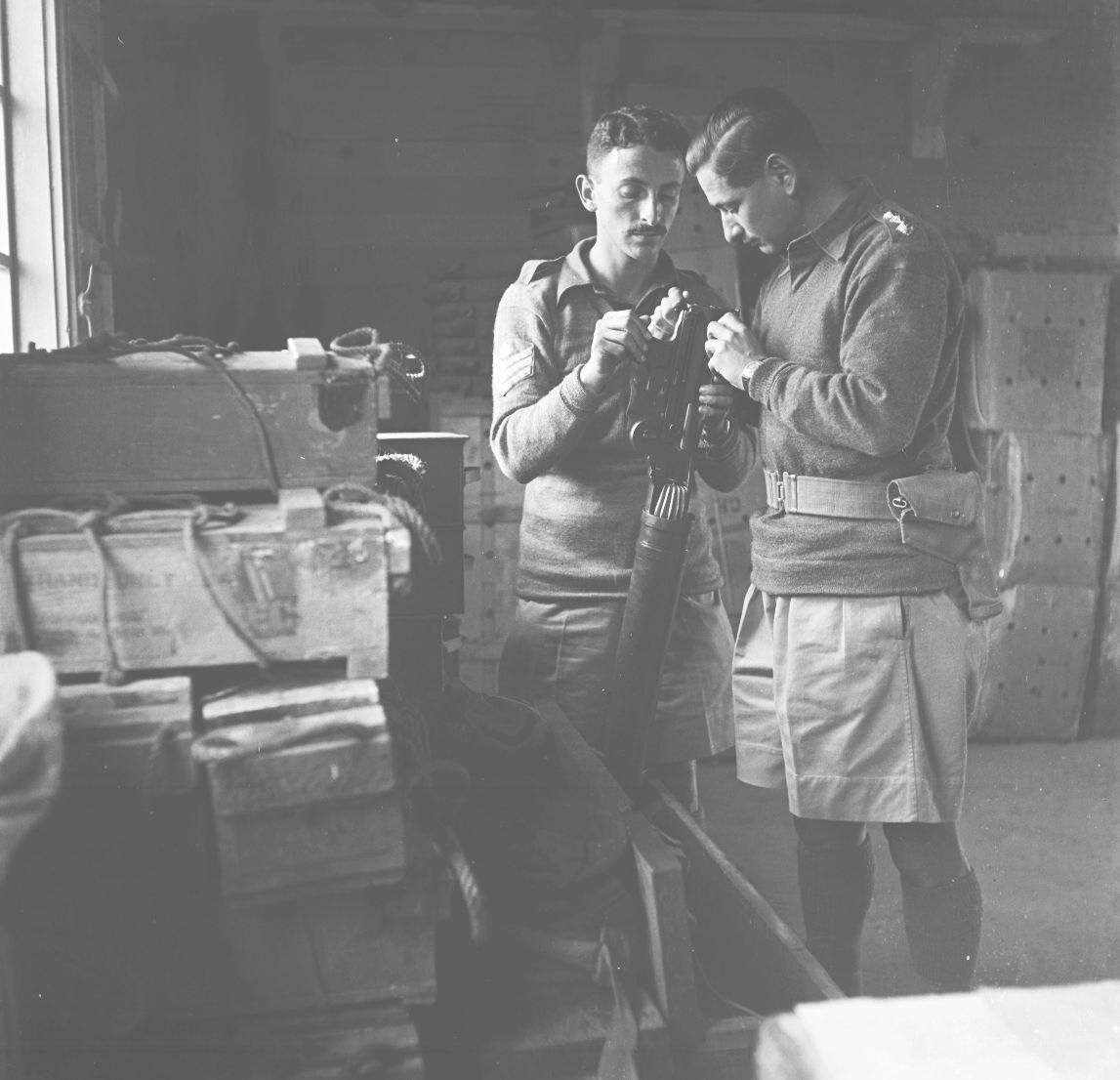
Buffs, 6th Company

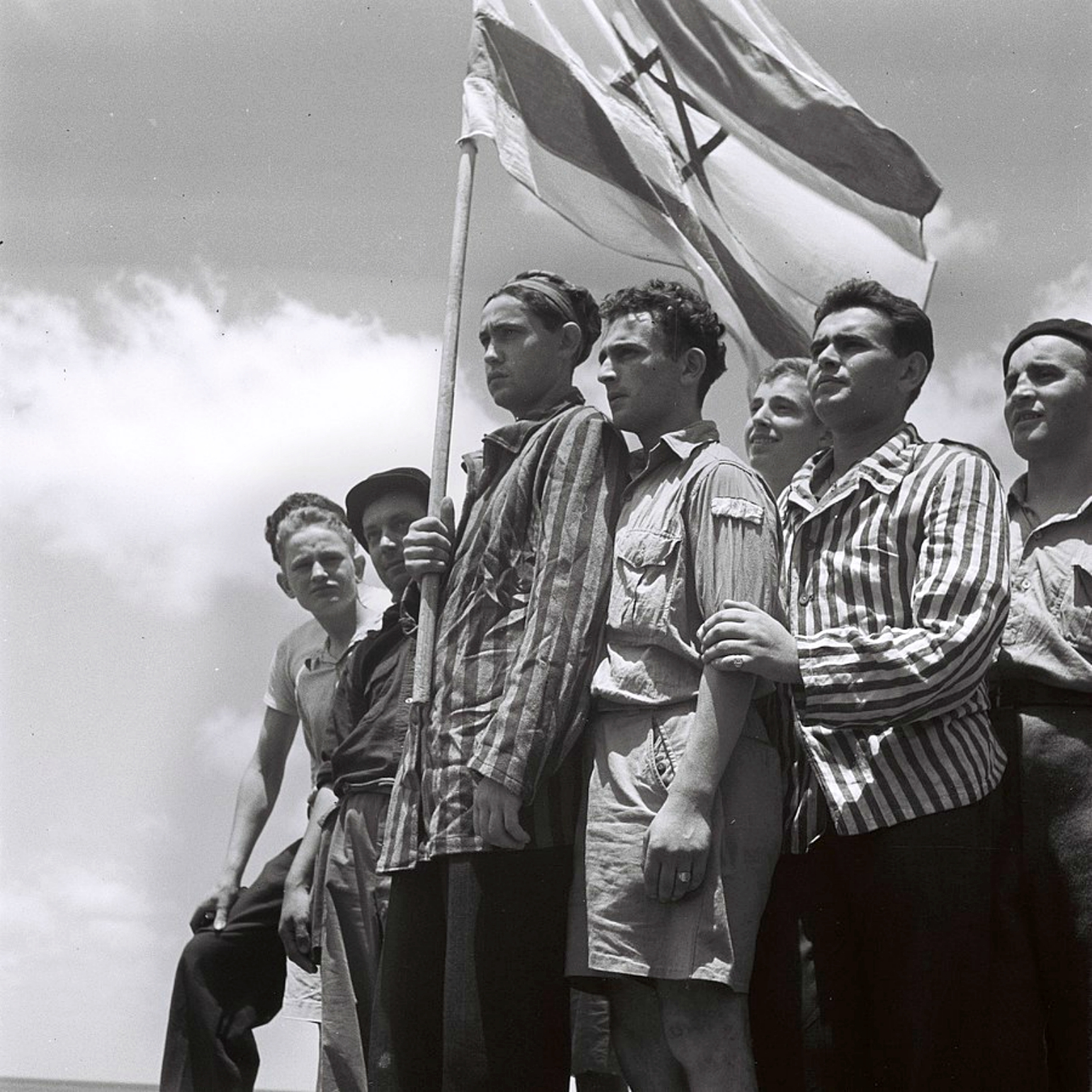
Buchenwald concentration camp survivors at Haifa port, 1945

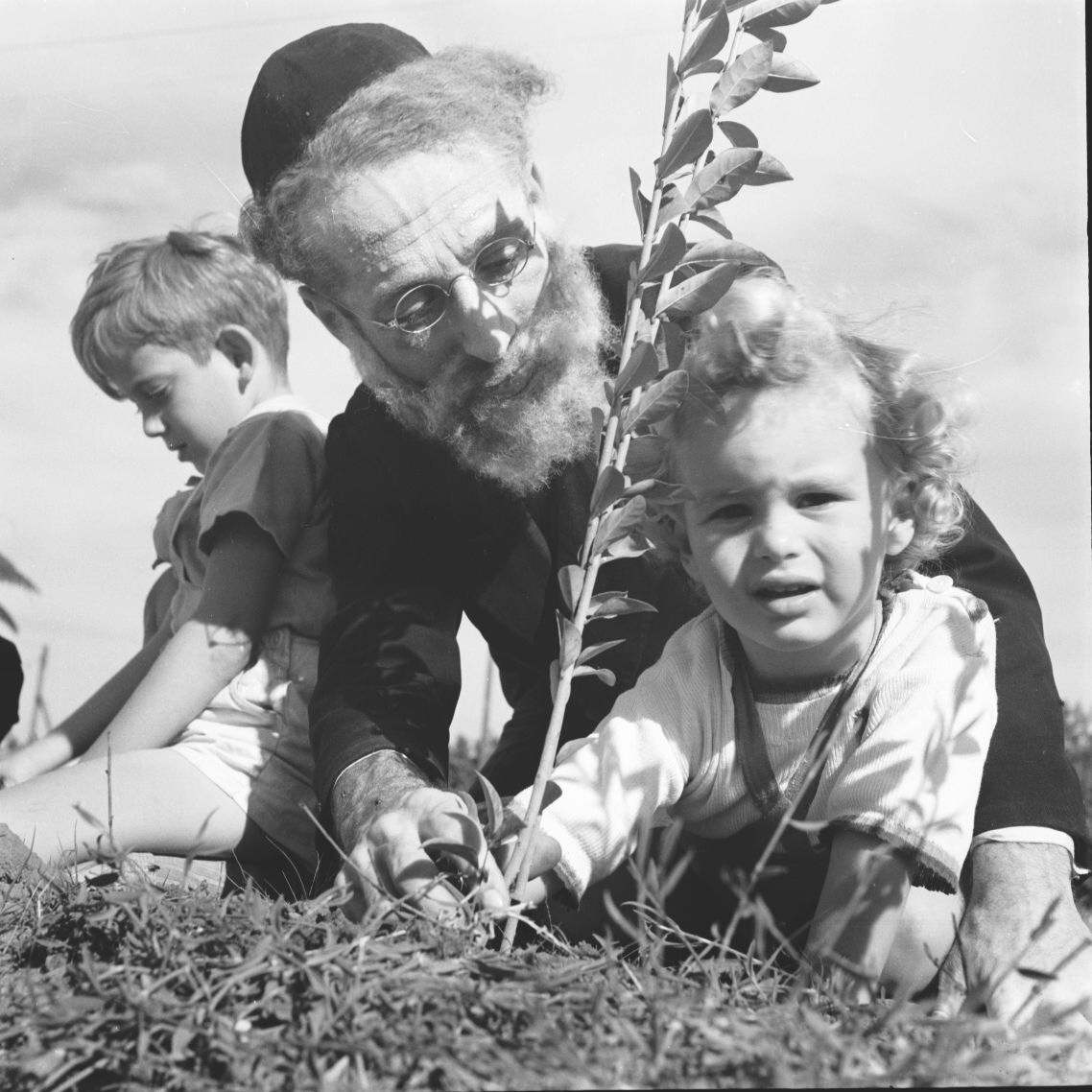
Tu BiShvat tree planting in Yishuv (1945)

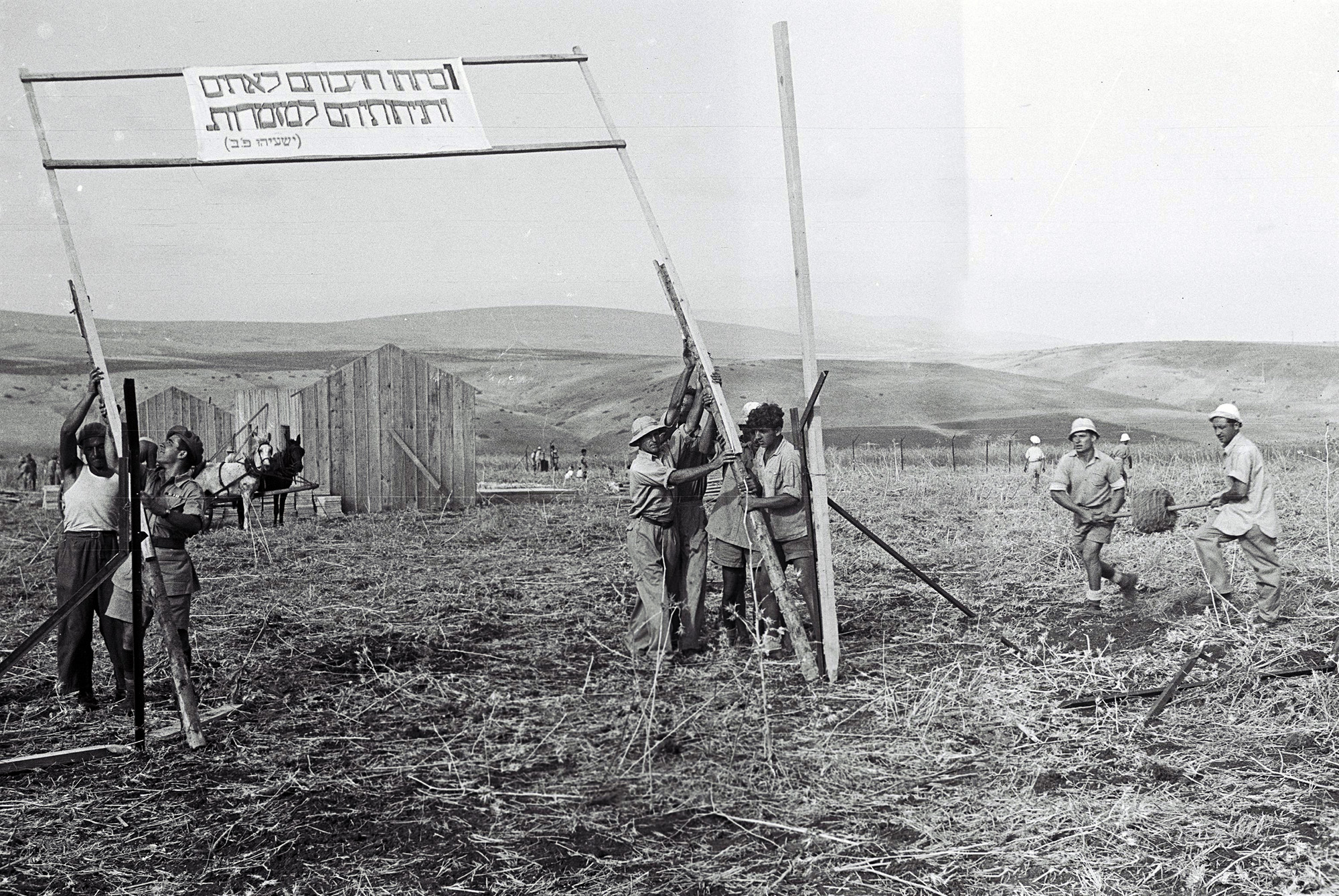
The establishment of moshav Kfar Kisch, 1946

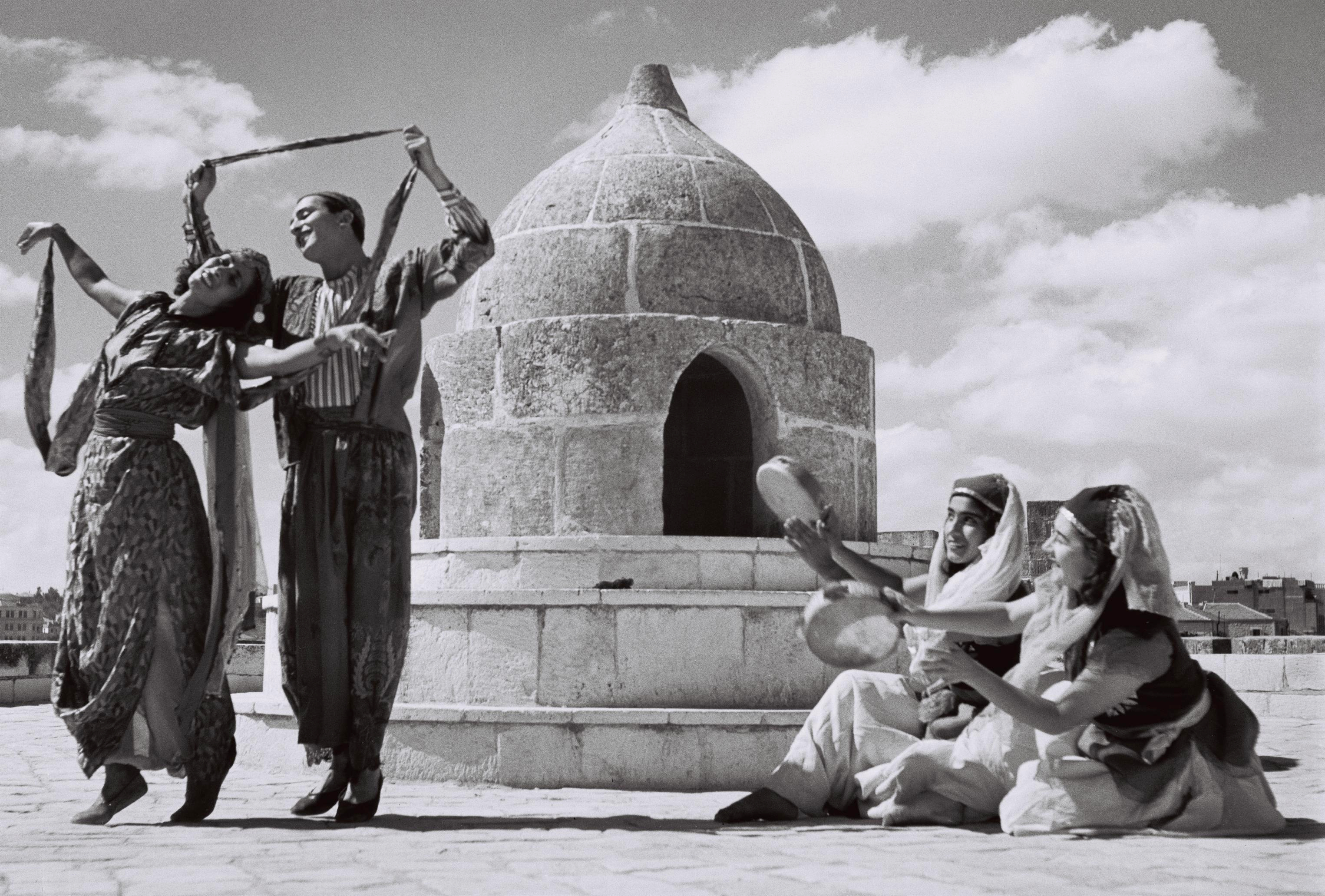
A Bukharan dance performed by members of the Rina Nikova ballet in the citadel of Jerusalem, 1946

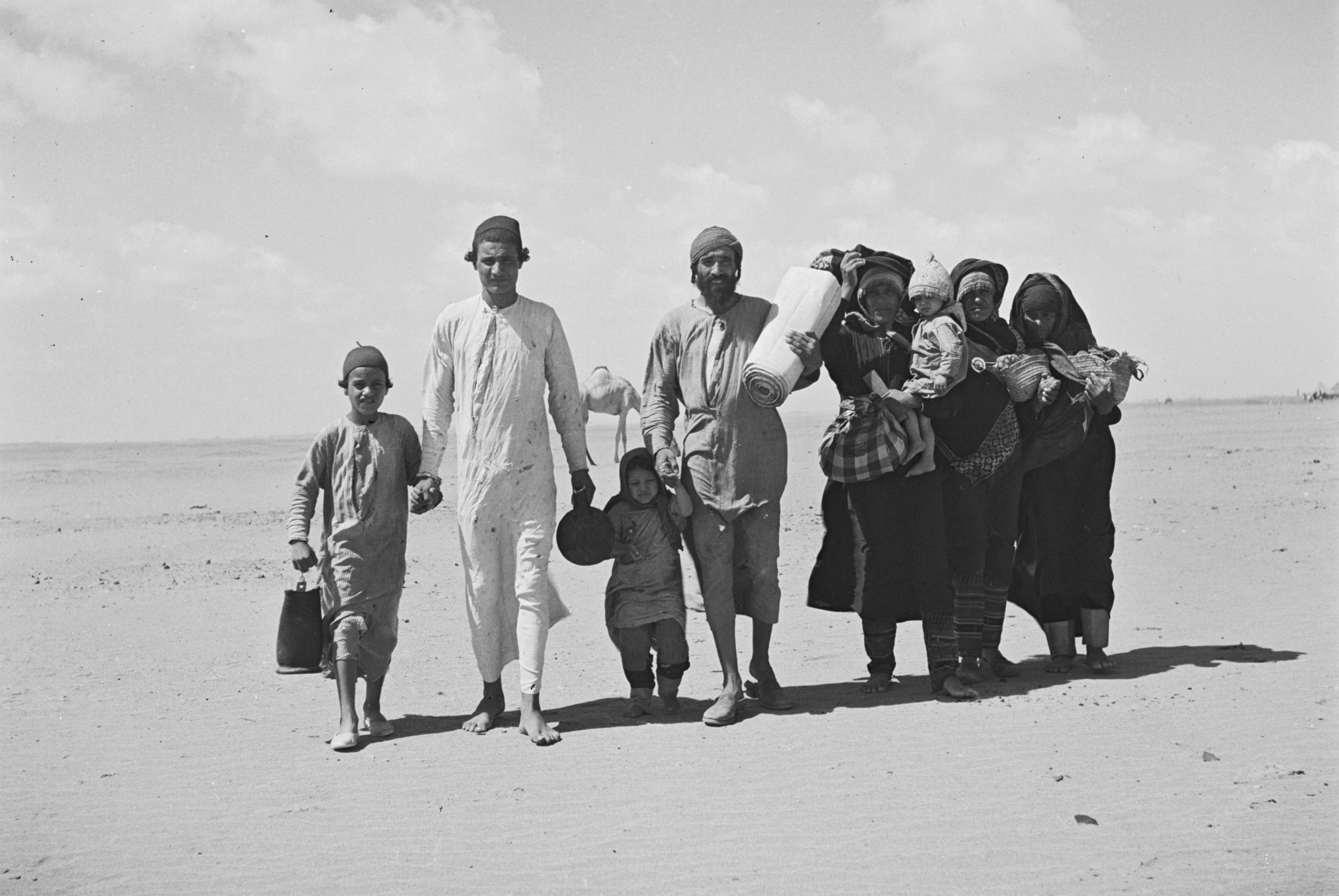
A Yemenite Jewish family walking to a transit camp in Aden on the way to Israel, 1949

== See also ==
Photographers active in Mandate Palestine 1918-1948

- Najib Anton Albina (1901–1983), master photographer of the Palestine Archaeological Museum
- American Colony, Jerusalem#Photography: see for its Photographic Department, later Matson Photographic Service, active c. 1900-1940s
- Armenians in Israel#Photographers: see for Armenian photographers in Jerusalem since 1857
- Ze'ev (Wilhelm) Aleksandrowicz (1905–1992), Polish-born photographer, active in Mandate Palestine between 1932 and 1935
- Ya'acov Ben-Dov (1882–1968), Israeli photographer and a pioneer of Jewish cinematography in Palestine
- Khalil Raad (1854–1957), known as "Palestine's first Arab photographer"
- David Rubinger (1924–2017), Israeli photographer, author of photo of paratroopers at the Western Wall in Six-Day War
- Samuel Joseph Schweig (1905–1985), landscape and archaeology photographer in Mandate Palestine and early Israel
- Herbert Sonnenfeld (1906–1972), German Jewish photographer, husband of Leni, photographed in Mandate Palestine in the 1930s
- Leni Sonnenfeld (1907–2004), German Jewish photographer, wife of Herbert, photographed Israel in the early years of its existence
- Rudi Weissenstein (1910–1999), Israeli photographer, author of iconic Declaration of Independence picture
