= Mishael Cheshin =

Israeli judge

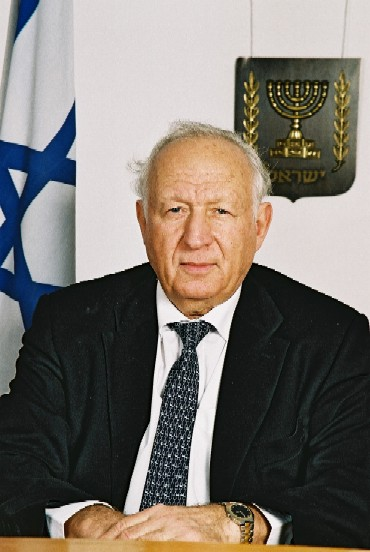
Mishael Cheshin

Mishael Cheshin (Hebrew: מישאל חשין; 16 February 1936 – 19 September 2015) was an Israeli Justice who served in the Supreme Court of Israel from 1992 to 2006.

== Biography ==
Mishael Cheshin was born in Beirut, Greater Lebanon. He was the son of Shneor Zalman Cheshin and Leah (née Margalit). His father, born in Jerusalem, was a Justice of the Israeli Supreme Court, and was related to Shneur Zalman of Liadi. His mother was born in Beirut to parents from Safed, and was the founding president of the Jerusalem Foundation. They had three children, one of them, Shneor, was killed in hit-and-run accident in 2010.

Cheshin studied in the Hebrew University High School and later studied law at the Hebrew University of Jerusalem.

== Legal career ==
Prior to his appointment as a Supreme Court justice, Cheshin served 16 years in the Justice Ministry, culminating with a stint as deputy-attorney general from 1974–1978. He then entered private practice for 14 years, before being appointed to the Court. While serving as chairman of Israel's Central Election Commission, Cheshin suspended broadcasts of a press conference held by Prime Minister Ariel Sharon as a violation of election law. On 19 September 2015, Cheshin died at the age of 79 from cancer.
