= International recognition of Palestine =

Palestine States that have recognized Palestine States whose recognition of Palestine is disputed States that have not recognized Palestine

As of September 2025, the State of Palestine is recognized as a sovereign state by 157 of the 193 member states of the United Nations (UN), or just over 81% of all UN members. It has been a non-member observer state of the UN General Assembly since November 2012. This limited status is largely due to the fact that the United States, a permanent member of the UN Security Council with veto power, has consistently blocked Palestine's full UN membership; Palestine is recognized by the other four permanent members, which are China, France, Russia, and the United Kingdom.

The State of Palestine was officially declared by the Palestine Liberation Organization (PLO) on 15 November 1988, claiming sovereignty over the internationally recognized Palestinian territories: the West Bank (which includes East Jerusalem) and the Gaza Strip. By the end of 1988, the Palestinian state was recognized by 78 countries. In an attempt to solve the decades-long Israeli–Palestinian conflict, the Oslo Accords were signed between Israel and the PLO in 1993 and 1995, creating the Palestinian Authority (PA) as a self-governing interim administration in Gaza and around 40% of the West Bank.

The Israeli–Palestinian peace process stalled during Benjamin Netanyahu's tenures as Prime Minister of Israel (1996–1999; 2009–2021; 2022–present), with Netanyahu opposing their statehood outside of Israel's control, in some cases prompting a more radical Palestinian response. In 2011, the State of Palestine was admitted into UNESCO. In 2012, it was accepted as an observer state of the UN General Assembly and the PA began to officially use the name "State of Palestine" for all purposes. In December 2014, the International Criminal Court recognized Palestine as a state.

Many countries support a two-state solution to the conflict. Fourteen of the nineteen member countries of the G20 (Argentina, Australia, Brazil, Canada, China, France, India, Indonesia, Mexico, Russia, Saudi Arabia, South Africa, Turkey, and the UK), plus permanent invitee Spain, have recognized Palestine as a state (four doing so in September 2025). The other five (Germany, Italy, Japan, South Korea, and the U.S.) do not recognize Palestine, but Italy and Japan have indicated that they would, the former contingent on Hamas meeting certain conditions.

== History ==
=== Background ===
On 22 November 1974, United Nations General Assembly Resolution 3236 recognized the right of the Palestinian people to self-determination, national independence and sovereignty in Palestine. It also recognized the Palestine Liberation Organization (PLO) as the sole legitimate representative of the Palestinian people, and accorded it observer status in the United Nations. The State of Palestine was officially declared by the PLO on 15 November 1988, claiming sovereignty over the internationally recognized Palestinian territories: the West Bank (which includes East Jerusalem) and the Gaza Strip. The designation "Palestine" for the PLO was adopted by the UN in 1988 in acknowledgment of the Palestinian declaration of independence.

Shortly after the 1988 declaration, the State of Palestine was recognized by many developing states in Africa and Asia, and from communist and non-aligned states. At that time, the United States was using its Foreign Assistance Act and other measures to discourage other countries and international organizations from extending recognition. Although these measures were successful in many cases, the Arab League and the Organisation of the Islamic Conference (OIC) immediately published statements of recognition of, support for, and solidarity with Palestine, which was accepted as a member state in both forums. By the end of 1988, the Palestinian state was recognized by 78 countries.

In February 1989 at the UN Security Council, the PLO representative acknowledged that 94 states had recognized the new Palestinian state. It subsequently attempted to gain membership as a state in several agencies connected to the UN, but its efforts faced threats from the U.S. that it would withhold funding from any organization that admitted Palestine. For example, in April of the same year, the PLO applied for membership as a state in the World Health Organization, an application that failed to produce a result after the U.S. informed the organization that it would withdraw funding if Palestine were admitted. In May, a group of OIC members submitted to UNESCO an application for membership on behalf of Palestine, and listed a total of 91 states that had recognized the State of Palestine.

In June 1989, the PLO submitted to the government of Switzerland letters of accession to the Geneva Conventions of 1949. As the depositary state, Switzerland determined that because the question of Palestinian statehood had not been settled within the international community, it was therefore incapable of determining whether the letter constituted a valid instrument of accession.

Due to the [uncertainty] within the international community as to the existence or the non-existence of a State of Palestine and as long as the issue has not been settled in an appropriate framework, the Swiss Government, in its capacity as depositary of the Geneva Conventions and their additional Protocols, is not in a position to decide whether this communication can be considered as an instrument of accession in the sense of the relevant provisions of the Conventions and their additional Protocols.

Consequently, in November 1989, the Arab League proposed a General Assembly resolution to formally recognize the PLO as the government of an independent Palestinian state. The draft was abandoned when the U.S. again threatened to cut off its financing for the UN should the vote go ahead. The Arab states agreed not to press the resolution, but demanded that the U.S. promise not to threaten the UN with financial sanctions again.

Many of the early statements of recognition of the State of Palestine were termed ambiguously. In addition, hesitation from others did not necessarily mean that these nations did not regard Palestine as a state. This has seemingly resulted in confusion regarding the number of states that have officially recognized the state declared in 1988. Numbers reported in the past are often conflicting, with figures as high as 130 being seen frequently. In July 2011, in an interview with Haaretz, Palestinian ambassador to the UN, Riyad Mansour claimed that 122 states had so far extended formal recognition. At the end of the month, the PLO published a paper on why the world's governments should recognize the State of Palestine and listed the 122 countries that had already done so. By the end of September the same year, Mansour claimed the figure had reached 139.

Since the outbreak of the Gaza war, several Western and Caribbean states began recognizing Palestine. In May 2024, Ireland, Norway, and Spain recognized Palestine as a coordinated effort. In an effort led by France, several more Western states recognized Palestine just before the general debate of the eightieth session of the UN General Assembly in September 2025. This move included recognition from G7 states for the first time (Canada, France, and the UK), and was described as a "historic diplomatic shift". Additionally, a one-day summit was organized on 22 September, one day before the general debate began, by France and Saudi Arabia to discuss the two-state solution.

=== Israeli position ===
Between the end of the Six-Day War and the Oslo Accords, no Israeli government proposed a Palestinian state. During Prime Minister Benjamin Netanyahu's government of 1996–1999, he accused the two previous governments of bringing closer to realization what he claimed to be the "danger" of a Palestinian state, and stated that his main policy goal was to ensure that the Palestinian Authority (PA) did not evolve beyond an autonomy.

In June 2003, Ariel Sharon was the first Israeli Prime Minister to proclaim that a Palestinian state was a possibility. Sharon addressed "the possibility of the establishment of a Palestinian state with temporary borders, if conditions permit" and claimed that interim Palestinian state would be "completely demilitarised, and this nation will be the home of the Palestinian diaspora and Palestinian refugees will not be allowed into Israeli territory."

The government headed by Ehud Olmert repeated the same objective. Netanyahu's second government in 2009 again claimed that a Palestinian state posed a danger for Israel. The government position changed following American pressure from the Obama administration. On 14 June 2009, Netanyahu for the first time made a speech in which he supported the notion of a demilitarized and territorially reduced Palestinian state. This position met some criticism for its lack of commitment on the territories to be ceded to the Palestinian state in the future. In February 2023, Netanyahu said: "I'm certainly willing to have them have all the powers that they need to govern themselves, but none of the powers that can threaten us, and this means that Israel should have the overriding security responsibility." In 2025, amid the ongoing Gaza war and multiple countries announcing plans to recognize Palestine, Netanyahu backtracked on his stance, vowing that a Palestinian state "will not be established" in a speech.

Israel has refused to accept the 1967 borders, which Israeli military experts have argued are strategically indefensible. It also opposes the Palestinian plan of approaching the UN General Assembly on the matter of statehood, as it claims it does not honour the Oslo Accords agreement in which both sides agreed not to pursue unilateral moves.

== Timeline of Palestine in the United Nations ==
- On 14 October 1974, the Palestine Liberation Organization (PLO) was recognized by the UN General Assembly as the representative of the Palestinian people and granted the right to participate in the deliberations of the General Assembly on the question of Palestine in plenary meetings.
- On 22 November 1974, the PLO was granted non-state observer status, allowing the PLO to participate in all Assembly sessions, as well as in other UN platforms.
- On 15 December 1988, UN General Assembly Resolution 43/177 acknowledged the Palestinian Declaration of Independence of November 1988 and replaced the designation "Palestine Liberation Organization" with "Palestine" in the UN system.
- On 23 September 2011, Palestinian President Mahmoud Abbas submitted an application for membership of Palestine in the UN.
- On 29 November 2012, UN General Assembly resolution 67/19 granted Palestine non-member observer state status.
- On 17 December 2012, UN Chief of Protocol Yeocheol Yoon decided that the constitutional name "State of Palestine" shall be used by the Secretariat in all official UN documents.
- On 10 May 2024, UN General Assembly Resolution ES-10/23 granted additional rights to the State of Palestine at the UN, including being seated with member states, the right to introduce proposals and agenda items, and participate in committees, but did not grant them the right to vote.
- On 28–30 July 2025, a multilateral conference was held at UN headquarters in New York at the initiative of the French and Saudi governments, calling for ending the war in Gaza and establishing a Palestinian state. It reconvened on 22 September.

=== Application for UN membership ===
After a two-year impasse in negotiations with Israel, the PA began a diplomatic campaign to gain recognition for the State of Palestine on the borders prior to the Six-Day War, with East Jerusalem as its capital. The efforts, which began in late 2009, gained widespread attention in September 2011, when President Mahmoud Abbas submitted an application to the UN to accept Palestine as a member state. This would have constituted collective recognition of the State of Palestine, which would have allowed its government to pursue legal claims against other states in international courts.

In order for a state to gain membership in the General Assembly, its application must have the support of two-thirds of member states with a prior recommendation for admission from the Security Council. This requires the absence of a veto from any of the Security Council's five permanent members. At the prospect of a veto from the U.S., Palestinian leaders signalled that they might opt instead for a more limited upgrade to "non-member state" status, which requires only a simple majority in the General Assembly but provides the Palestinians with the recognition they desired.

The campaign, dubbed "Palestine 194", was supported by the Arab League in May 2011, and was officially confirmed by the PLO on 26 June. The decision was labelled by the Israeli government as a unilateral step, while the Palestinian government countered that it was essential to overcoming the current impasse. Several other countries—such as Germany and Canada—also denounced the decision and called for a prompt return to negotiations; however, many others—such as Norway and Russia—endorsed the plan, as did Secretary-General Ban Ki-moon, who stated: "UN members are entitled whether to vote for or against the Palestinian statehood recognition at the UN."

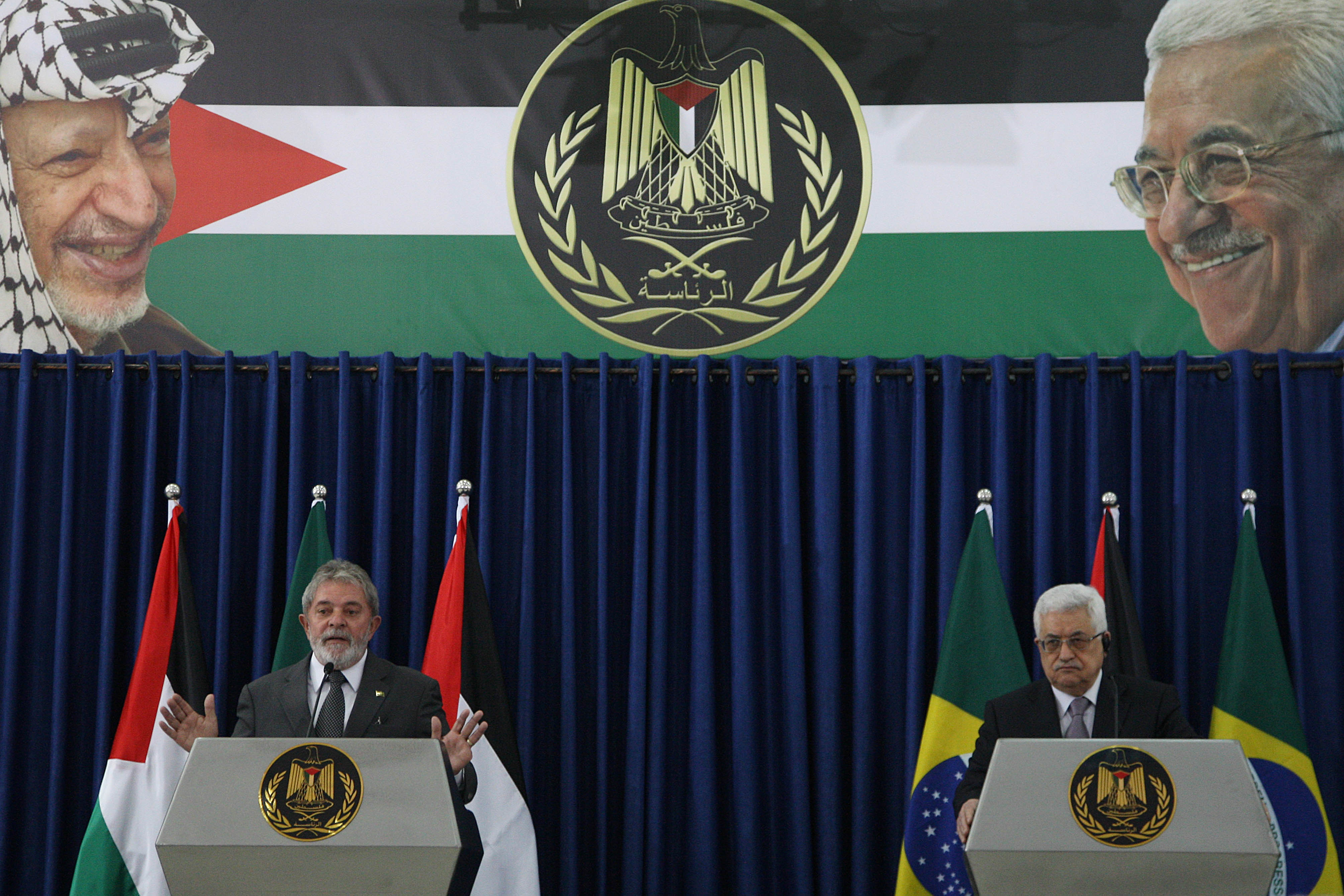
President Luiz Inácio Lula da Silva of Brazil formally recognized the State of Palestine in December 2010.

Diplomatic efforts to gain support for the bid gained momentum following a succession of endorsements from South America in early 2011. High-level delegations led by Yasser Abed Rabbo, Riyad al-Maliki, Saeb Erekat, Nabil Shaath, and Riyad Mansour paid visits to many states. Palestinian ambassadors, assisted by those of other Arab states, were charged with enlisting the support of the governments to which they were accredited. During the lead-up to the vote, Russia, China, and Spain publicly pledged their support for the Palestinian bid, as did inter-governmental organizations such as the African Union, and the Non-Aligned Movement.

Israel took steps to counter the initiative, and Germany, Italy, Canada and the U.S. announced publicly that they would vote against the resolution. Israeli and U.S. diplomats began a campaign pressuring many countries to oppose or abstain from the vote; however, because of the "automatic majority" enjoyed by the Palestinians in the General Assembly, the Netanyahu administration stated that it did not expect to prevent a resolution from passing should it go ahead. In August, Haaretz quoted the Israeli ambassador to the UN, Ron Prosor, as stating that Israel would be unable to block a resolution at the General Assembly by September. "The maximum that we can hope to gain is for a group of states who will abstain or be absent during the vote", wrote Prosor. "Only a few countries will vote against the Palestinian initiative."

Instead, the Israeli government focused on obtaining a "moral majority" of major democratic powers, in an attempt to diminish the weight of the vote. Considerable weight was placed on the position of the European Union, which had not yet been announced. EU foreign policy chief Catherine Ashton stated that it was likely to depend on the wording of the resolution. At the end of August, Israel's defence minister Ehud Barak said that "it is very important that all the players come up with a text that will emphasize the quick return to negotiations, without an effort to impose pre-conditions on the sides."

Efforts from both Israel and the U.S. also focused on pressuring the Palestinian leadership to abandon its plans and return to negotiations. In the U.S., Congress passed a bill denouncing the initiative and calling on the Obama administration to veto any resolution that would recognize a Palestinian state declared outside of an agreement negotiated by the two parties. A similar bill was passed in the Senate, which also threatened a withdrawal of aid to the West Bank. In late August, another congressional bill was introduced which proposes to block U.S. government funding for UN entities that support Palestinian membership in the UN. Several top U.S. officials, including ambassador to the UN Susan Rice and consul-general in Jerusalem Daniel Rubinstein, made similar threats. In the same month, it was reported that the Israeli Ministry of Finance was withholding its monthly payments to the PNA. Foreign Minister Avigdor Lieberman warned that if Palestine took unilateral action, Israel would consider the Oslo Accords null and void, and would break off relations with the PA.

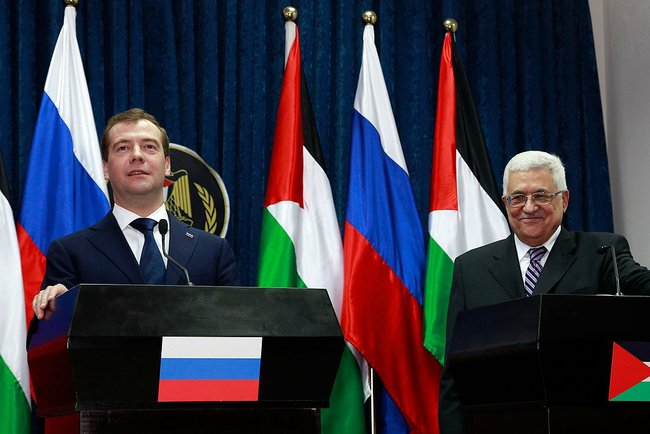
President Dmitry Medvedev of Russia reconfirmed its support for the State of Palestine in January 2011.

On 11 July 2011, the Quartet met to discuss a return to negotiations, but the meeting produced no result. President Mahmoud Abbas claimed that he would suspend the bid and return to negotiations if the Israelis agreed to the 1967 borders and ceased the expansion of settlements in the West Bank. The PNA's campaign saw an increasing level of support in grass-roots activism. Avaaz began an online petition urging all UN members to endorse the bid to admit Palestine; it reportedly attained 500,000 e-signatures in its first four days. OneVoice Palestine launched a domestic campaign in partnership with local news agencies, with the aim of getting the involvement and support of Palestinian citizens.

Overseas, campaigns were launched in several nations, calling on their governments to vote "yes" in the resolution. On 7 September, a group of Palestinian activists under the banner "Palestine: State No. 194" staged a demonstration outside the UN's office in Ramallah. During the demonstration, they submitted to the office a letter addressed to Secretary-General Ban Ki-moon, urging him to "exert all possible efforts toward the achievement of the Palestinian people's just demands". The following day, Ban told reporters, "I support ... the statehood of Palestinians; an independent, sovereign state of Palestine. It has been long overdue", but he also stated that "recognition of a state is something to be determined by the member states."

Other UN organs had previously expressed readiness to see a Palestinian state. In April 2011, the UN's co-ordinator for the Middle East peace process issued a report on the PA's state-building progress, describing "aspects of its administration as sufficient for an independent state". It echoed a similar assessment published the week prior by the International Monetary Fund. The World Bank released a report in September 2010 that found the PA "well-positioned to establish a state" at any point in the near future; however, the report highlighted that, unless private-sector growth in the Palestinian economy was stimulated, a Palestinian state would remain donor dependent.

UN Security Council resolution vote on the recommendation to the UN General Assembly regarding the admission of the State of Palestine as a member of the UN 2024 UNSC Members vote result: In favour Against Abstentions Date: 18 April 2024
In favour (12)	Abstentions (2)	Against (1)
Algeria**^{D}**, **China**, Ecuador, **France**, Guyana, Japan, Malta**^{P}**, Mozambique, **Russia**, Sierra Leone, Slovenia, South Korea	Switzerland, **United Kingdom**	**United States^{V}**

Note

Bold: Denotes the permanent members of the UN Security Council (UNSC).
^{P}: Malta was the president of the UN Security Council when the vote was conducted.
^{D}: Algeria submitted the draft resolution under consideration.
^{V}: As a permanent UNSC member, the U.S. exercised its veto power, which prevented adoption of the proposal by the UNSC as a body.

=== Non-member observer state status ===
UN observer state status voting results: In favour Against Abstentions Absent Non-members

During September 2012, Palestine decided to pursue an upgrade in status from "observer entity" to "non-member observer state". On 27 November of the same year, it was announced that the appeal had been made officially and would be put to a vote in the General Assembly on 29 November, where the status upgrade was expected to be supported by a majority of states. In addition to granting Palestine "non-member observer state status", the draft resolution "expresses the hope that the Security Council will consider favourably the application submitted on 23 September 2011 by the State of Palestine for admission to full membership in the United Nations, endorses the two state solution based on the pre-1967 borders, and stresses the need for an immediate resumption of negotiations between the two parties."

On 29 November 2012, in a 138–9 vote (with 41 abstaining) General Assembly resolution 67/19 passed, upgrading Palestine to "non-member observer state" status in the UN. The new status equated Palestine's with that of the Holy See. The change in status was described by The Independent as "de facto recognition of the sovereign state of Palestine". Voting "no" were Israel, Canada, the Czech Republic, the Marshall Islands, the Federated States of Micronesia, Nauru, Palau, Panama and the U.S.

The vote was an important benchmark for the partially recognized State of Palestine and its citizens, while being a diplomatic setback for Israel and the U.S. Status as an observer state in the UN allows the State of Palestine to join treaties and specialized UN agencies, the Law of the Seas treaty, and the International Criminal Court (ICC). It permits Palestine to pursue legal rights over its territorial waters and air space as a sovereign state recognized by the UN, and allows the Palestinian people the right to sue for sovereignty over their territory in the International Court of Justice and to bring "crimes against humanity" and war-crimes charges, including that of unlawfully occupying the territory of State of Palestine, against Israel in the ICC. In December 2014, the ICC recognized Palestine as a state without prejudice to any future judicial determinations on the issue of statehood.

After the resolution was passed, the UN has permitted Palestine to title its representative office to the UN as "The Permanent Observer Mission of the State of Palestine to the United Nations", seen by many as a reflection of the UN's de facto position of recognizing the State of Palestine's sovereignty under international law, and Palestine started to re-title its name accordingly on postal stamps, official documents and passports. The Palestinian authorities also instructed its diplomats to officially represent the "State of Palestine", as opposed to the "Palestine National Authority". On 17 December 2012, UN Chief of Protocol Yeocheol Yoon decided that "the designation of "State of Palestine" shall be used by the Secretariat in all official United Nations documents", recognizing the "State of Palestine" as the official name of the Palestinian nation. On 26 September 2013 at the UN, Mahmoud Abbas was given the right to sit in the General Assembly's beige chair which is reserved for heads of state waiting to take the podium and address the General Assembly.

=== Renewed membership efforts and additional rights at the UN ===
The effort to secure full UN membership was renewed in 2024 during the Gaza war, with the UN Security Council holding a vote on the topic in April. Although the vote had a majority of 12 in favour with two abstentions, the U.S. voted against and therefore vetoed the measure. On 10 May 2024, the UN General Assembly passed a resolution that recognized that Palestine met the requirements for UN membership, and requested that the Security Council reconsider admitting the state. It also granted Palestine additional rights at the UN, including being seated with member states, the right to introduce proposals and agenda items, and participate in committees, but did not grant them the right to vote.

== States that recognize Palestine ==
=== UN member states ===
157 of the 193 UN member states have recognized the State of Palestine.

States whose recognition of Palestine is disputed

Name	Date of recognition	Diplomatic relations	Relevant membership, further details
Algeria	15 November 1988	Yes	Arab League, African Union (AU), OIC; Algeria–Palestine relations
Bahrain	15 November 1988	Yes	Arab League, GCC, OIC; Bahrain–Palestine relations Further details Recognition extended by the State of Bahrain.
Indonesia	15 November 1988	Yes	ASEAN, BRICS, G20, OIC; Indonesia–Palestine relations
Iraq	15 November 1988	Yes	Arab League, OIC; Iraq–Palestine relations Further details Recognition extended by the Ba'athist Iraqi Republic.
Kuwait	15 November 1988	Yes	Arab League, GCC, OIC; Kuwait–Palestine relations
Libya	15 November 1988	Yes	Arab League, AU, OIC; Libya–Palestine relations Further details Recognition extended by the Great Socialist People's Libyan Arab Jamahiriya.
Malaysia	15 November 1988	Yes	ASEAN, OIC; Malaysia–Palestine relations
Mauritania	15 November 1988	Yes	Arab League, AU, OIC
Morocco	15 November 1988	Yes	Arab League, AU, OIC; Morocco–Palestine relations
Somalia	15 November 1988	Yes	Arab League, AU, OIC; Palestine–Somalia relations Further details Recognition extended by the Somali Democratic Republic.
Tunisia	15 November 1988	Yes	Arab League, AU, OIC; Palestine–Tunisia relations
Turkey	15 November 1988	Yes	G20, NATO, OIC, OTS; Palestine–Turkey relations
Yemen	15 November 1988	Yes	Arab League, OIC; Palestine–Yemen relations Further details Recognition extended by both Democratic Yemen and the Yemen Arab Republic, prior to Yemeni unification. In a joint letter to the UN Secretary-General sent just prior to unification, the Ministers of Foreign affairs of North and South Yemen stated: "All treaties and agreements concluded between either the Yemen Arab Republic or the People's Democratic Republic of Yemen and other States and international organizations in accordance with international law which are in force on 22 May 1990 will remain in effect, and international relations existing on 22 May 1990 between the People's Democratic Republic of Yemen and the Yemen Arab Republic and other States will continue."
Afghanistan	16 November 1988	Yes	OIC, SAARC; Afghanistan–Palestine relations Further details Recognition extended by the Democratic Republic of Afghanistan.
Bangladesh	16 November 1988	Yes	OIC, SAARC; Bangladesh–Palestine relations
Cuba	16 November 1988	Yes	—, Cuba–Palestine relations
Jordan	16 November 1988	Yes	Arab League, OIC; Jordan–Palestine relations
Madagascar	16 November 1988	No	AU Further details Recognition extended by the Democratic Republic of Madagascar.
Nicaragua	16 November 1988	Yes	—
Pakistan	16 November 1988	Yes	OIC, SAARC; Pakistan–Palestine relations
Qatar	16 November 1988	Yes	Arab League, GCC, OIC; Palestine–Qatar relations
Saudi Arabia	16 November 1988	Yes	Arab League, G20, GCC, OIC; Palestine–Saudi Arabia relations
United Arab Emirates	16 November 1988	Yes	Arab League, BRICS, GCC, OIC; Palestine–United Arab Emirates relations
Serbia	16 November 1988	Yes	—, Palestine–Serbia relations Further details Recognition extended by the Socialist Federal Republic of Yugoslavia (SFRY). Although the UN did not recognize the Federal Republic of Yugoslavia (later renamed Serbia and Montenegro, itself to be succeeded by Serbia in 2006) as its exclusive successor, it claimed to be such and pledged to adhere to all ratifications, signatures and recognitions conducted by the SFRY.
Zambia	16 November 1988	Yes	AU
Albania	17 November 1988	Yes	NATO, OIC; Albania–Palestine relations Further details Recognition extended by the People's Socialist Republic of Albania.
Brunei	17 November 1988	Yes	ASEAN, OIC; Brunei–Palestine relations
Djibouti	17 November 1988	Yes	Arab League, AU, OIC; Djibouti–Palestine relations
Mauritius	17 November 1988	Yes	AU Further details Recognition extended by Mauritius as a Commonwealth realm.
Sudan	17 November 1988	Yes	Arab League, AU, OIC; Palestine–Sudan relations
Cyprus	18 November 1988	Yes	EU; Cyprus–Palestine relations Further details In January 2011, the Cypriot government reaffirmed its recognition of the Palestinian state in 1988. The government also added that any modifications to the borders from 1967 onwards would not be acknowledged until both countries reached a consensus.
Czech Republic (disputed)	18 November 1988	Yes	EU, NATO Further details The Czech Republic's predecessor, Czechoslovakia, recognized Palestine on 18 November 1988. Upon its secession from the federation, the Czech Republic declared that it would continue to recognize all states which had been recognized by Czechoslovakia. However, the current Czech government's position is that its predecessor's recognition was a political act which did not constitute formal recognition, and that Palestine never met the conditions of statehood. Since the 2010s, the Czech government has repeatedly reiterated its non-recognition of a Palestinian state, as recently as 2025. However, certain academics and politicians contend that the Czech Republic continues to recognize Palestine.
Slovakia	18 November 1988	Yes	EU, NATO; Palestine–Slovakia relations Further details Slovakia's predecessor, Czechoslovakia, recognized Palestine on 18 November 1988. Following its dissolution, Slovakia reaffirmed its recognition of Palestine in 1993.
Egypt	18 November 1988	Yes	Arab League, AU, BRICS, OIC; Egypt–Palestine relations
Gambia	18 November 1988	Yes	AU, OIC
India	18 November 1988	Yes	BRICS, G20, SAARC; India–Palestine relations
Nigeria	18 November 1988	Yes	AU, OIC; Nigeria–Palestine relations
Seychelles	18 November 1988	Yes	AU
Sri Lanka	18 November 1988	Yes	SAARC; Palestine–Sri Lanka relations
Namibia	19 November 1988	Yes	AU; Namibia–Palestine relations Further details Namibia was established by the South West Africa People's Organization (SWAPO), which recognized the State of Palestine during its time as a UN observer entity.
Russia	19 November 1988	Yes	BRICS, CSTO, G20, UNSC (permanent); Palestine–Russia relations Further details Recognition extended as the Union of Soviet Socialist Republics. President Dmitry Medvedev reconfirmed the position in January 2011.
Belarus	19 November 1988	Yes	CSTO; Belarus–Palestine relations Further details Recognition extended as the Byelorussian Soviet Socialist Republic. Belarus is the legal successor of the Byelorussian SSR and in the Constitution it states, "Laws, decrees and other acts which were applied in the territory of the Republic of Belarus prior to the entry into force of the present Constitution shall apply in the particular parts thereof that are not contrary to the Constitution of the Republic of Belarus."
Ukraine	19 November 1988	Yes	—, Palestine–Ukraine relations Further details Recognition extended as the Ukrainian Soviet Socialist Republic, of which Ukraine is the legal successor. The modern republic continues all "rights and duties pursuant to international agreements of Union SSR which do not contradict the Constitution of Ukraine and interests of the Republic".
Vietnam	19 November 1988	Yes	ASEAN; Palestine–Vietnam relations
China	20 November 1988	Yes	BRICS, G20, UNSC (permanent); China–Palestine relations Further details Under the One China principle, the State of Palestine also recognizes the People's Republic of China as the sole legitimate government of the Chinese state and does not recognize the legitimacy of the Republic of China on Taiwan.
Burkina Faso	21 November 1988	Yes	AU, OIC; Burkina Faso–Palestine relations
Comoros	21 November 1988	Yes	Arab League, AU, OIC; Comoros–Palestine relations Further details Recognition extended by the Federal and Islamic Republic of the Comoros.
Guinea	21 November 1988	Yes	AU, OIC
Guinea-Bissau	21 November 1988	Yes	AU, OIC
Cambodia	21 November 1988	Yes	ASEAN Further details Recognition extended by the People's Republic of Kampuchea, the predecessor to modern Cambodia. Its civil-war rival, internationally recognized Democratic Kampuchea, announced its recognition three days prior.
Mali	21 November 1988	Yes	AU, OIC
Mongolia	22 November 1988	Yes	— Further details Recognition extended by the Mongolian People's Republic.
Senegal	22 November 1988	Yes	AU, OIC
Hungary (disputed)	23 November 1988	Yes	EU, NATO; Hungary–Palestine relations Further details Recognition extended by the Hungarian People's Republic. From 2024, the Hungarian government opposed recognition of Palestinian statehood. In 2025, Agence France-Presse and CNN excluded Hungary from their lists of states that recognize Palestine. However, certain sources contend that Hungary has not formally withdrawn its recognition of Palestine. In 2026, following the formation of a new Hungarian government, the State Secretary for Bilateral Relations at the Hungarian Foreign Ministry stated that Hungary aspired to "balanced relations with all parties" and referred to Palestine as a country.
Cape Verde	24 November 1988	Yes	AU
North Korea	24 November 1988	Yes	—, North Korea–Palestine relations
Niger	24 November 1988	Yes	AU, OIC
Romania	24 November 1988	Yes	EU, NATO; Palestine–Romania relations Further details Recognition extended by the Socialist Republic of Romania.
Tanzania	24 November 1988	Yes	AU; Palestine–Tanzania relations
Bulgaria	25 November 1988	Yes	EU, NATO; Bulgaria–Palestine relations Further details Recognition extended by the People's Republic of Bulgaria.
Maldives	28 November 1988	Yes	OIC, SAARC; Maldives–Palestine relations
Ghana	29 November 1988	Yes	AU; Ghana–Palestine relations
Togo	29 November 1988	Yes	AU, OIC
Zimbabwe	29 November 1988	Yes	AU; Palestine–Zimbabwe relations
Chad	1 December 1988	Yes	AU, OIC
Laos	2 December 1988	Yes	ASEAN
Sierra Leone	3 December 1988	Yes	AU, OIC
Uganda	3 December 1988	Yes	AU, OIC
Republic of the Congo	5 December 1988	Yes	AU Further details Recognition extended by the People's Republic of the Congo.
Angola	6 December 1988	Yes	AU Further details Recognition extended by the People's Republic of Angola.
Mozambique	8 December 1988	Yes	AU, OIC Further details Recognition extended by the People's Republic of Mozambique.
São Tomé and Príncipe	10 December 1988	Yes	AU
Gabon	12 December 1988	Yes	AU, OIC
Oman	13 December 1988	Yes	Arab League, GCC, OIC; Oman–Palestine relations
Poland	14 December 1988	Yes	EU, NATO; Palestine–Poland relations Further details Recognition extended by the Polish People's Republic.
Democratic Republic of the Congo	18 December 1988	No	AU Further details Recognition extended by the Republic of Zaire, which was ruled by Mobutu Sese Seko until his removal in 1997 when the state was succeeded by the Democratic Republic of the Congo during the First Congo War.
Botswana	19 December 1988	Yes	AU
Nepal	19 December 1988	No	SAARC Further details Recognition extended by the Kingdom of Nepal.
Burundi	22 December 1988	No	AU
Central African Republic	23 December 1988	No	AU
Bhutan	25 December 1988	No	SAARC
Rwanda	2 January 1989	No	AU
Ethiopia	4 February 1989	Yes	AU, BRICS; Ethiopia–Palestine relations Further details Recognition extended by the People's Democratic Republic of Ethiopia.
Iran	4 February 1989	Yes	BRICS, OIC; Iran–Palestine relations Further details Some documents list the date of Iran's recognition as 4 February 1988, but this predates the PLO's declaration of independence on 15 November 1988.
Benin	12 May 1989	Yes	AU, OIC Further details Recognition extended by the People's Republic of Benin.
Kenya	12 May 1989	Yes	AU; Kenya–Palestine relations
Equatorial Guinea	May 1989	Yes	AU
Vanuatu	21 August 1989	Yes	MSG, PIF
Philippines	4 September 1989	Yes	ASEAN; Palestine–Philippines relations
Eswatini	1 July 1991	Yes	AU Further details Recognition extended as Swaziland.
Kazakhstan	6 April 1992	Yes	CSTO, OIC, OTS; Kazakhstan–Palestine relations
Azerbaijan	15 April 1992	Yes	OIC, OTS; Azerbaijan–Palestine relations
Turkmenistan	17 April 1992	Yes	OIC
Georgia	25 April 1992	Yes	—, Georgia–Palestine relations
Bosnia and Herzegovina	27 May 1992	Yes	Bosnia and Herzegovina–Palestine relations Further details Recognition extended by the Republic of Bosnia and Herzegovina.
Tajikistan	2 April 1994	Yes	CSTO, OIC
Uzbekistan	25 September 1994	Yes	OIC, OTS
Papua New Guinea (disputed)	4 October 1994	Yes	MSG, PIF Further details In July 2025, Agence France-Presse removed Papua New Guinea from its list of states recognizing Palestine based on comments it received from the Papua New Guinean foreign secretary that it was "not aware of any position by PNG to establish any relations with Palestine". The Australian Broadcasting Corporation and Deutsche Welle exclude Papua New Guinea from their lists of states recognizing Palestine.
South Africa	15 February 1995	Yes	AU, BRICS, G20; Palestine–South Africa relations
Kyrgyzstan	November 1995	Yes	CSTO, OIC, OTS; Kyrgyzstan–Palestine relations
Malawi	23 October 1998	Yes	AU
Timor-Leste	1 March 2004	Yes	ASEAN
Paraguay	25 March 2005	Yes	Mercosur, OAS Further details On 28 January 2011, Paraguay's Ministry of Foreign Affairs issued a written reaffirmation of its government's recognition of the State of Palestine. The statement noted that the establishment of diplomatic relations between the two governments in 2005 had implied mutual recognition.
Montenegro	24 July 2006	Yes	NATO; Montenegro–Palestine relations
Costa Rica	5 February 2008	Yes	OAS
Lebanon	30 November 2008	Yes	Arab League, OIC; Lebanon–Palestine relations Further details Date given is that of first official recognition. In Palestine's application to UNESCO in May 1989, Lebanon was listed as having recognized the State of Palestine, but without a date. The list was submitted without objection from Lebanon, but later sources have shown that official recognition was not accorded until 2008. At that time, the Lebanese cabinet approved the establishment of full diplomatic relations with the State of Palestine, but did not set a date for when this was to occur. On 11 August 2011, the cabinet agreed to implement its earlier decision and Abbas formally inaugurated his government's embassy in Beirut on 16 August.
Ivory Coast	1 December 2008	Yes	AU, OIC
Venezuela	27 April 2009	Yes	—, Palestine–Venezuela relations
Dominican Republic	15 July 2009	Yes	OAS
Brazil	1 December 2010	Yes	BRICS, G20, Mercosur, OAS; Brazil–Palestine relations
Argentina	6 December 2010	Yes	G20, Mercosur, OAS; Argentina–Palestine relations
Bolivia	17 December 2010	Yes	Mercosur, OAS; Bolivia–Palestine relations
Ecuador	24 December 2010	Yes	OAS; Ecuador–Palestine relations
Chile	7 January 2011	Yes	OAS; Chile–Palestine relations
Guyana	13 January 2011	Yes	CARICOM, OAS, OIC
Peru	24 January 2011	Yes	OAS; Palestine–Peru relations
Suriname	26 January 2011	No	CARICOM, OAS, OIC
Uruguay	15 March 2011	Yes	Mercosur, OAS; Palestine–Uruguay relations
Lesotho	3 May 2011	Yes	AU
South Sudan	14 July 2011	Yes	AU
Syria	18 July 2011	Yes	Arab League, OIC; Palestine–Syria relations Further details Recognition extended by Ba'athist Syria.
Liberia	19 July 2011	No	AU
El Salvador	25 August 2011	Yes	OAS; El Salvador–Palestine relations
Honduras	26 August 2011	Yes	OAS; Honduras–Palestine relations
Saint Vincent and the Grenadines	29 August 2011	Yes	CARICOM, OAS
Belize	9 September 2011	Yes	CARICOM, OAS
Dominica	19 September 2011	Yes	CARICOM, OAS
Antigua and Barbuda	22 September 2011	Yes	CARICOM, OAS
Grenada	25 September 2011	Yes	CARICOM, OAS
Iceland	15 December 2011	Yes	EFTA, NATO; Iceland–Palestine relations
Thailand	18 January 2012	Yes	ASEAN; Palestine–Thailand relations
Guatemala	9 April 2013	No	OAS
Haiti	27 September 2013	Yes	CARICOM, OAS
Sweden	30 October 2014	Yes	EU, NATO; Palestine–Sweden relations
Saint Lucia	14 September 2015	Yes	CARICOM, OAS
Colombia	3 August 2018	Yes	OAS
Saint Kitts and Nevis	29 July 2019	Yes	CARICOM, OAS
Barbados	19 April 2024	Yes	CARICOM, OAS
Jamaica	22 April 2024	No	CARICOM, OAS
Trinidad and Tobago	2 May 2024	Yes	CARICOM, OAS
Bahamas	7 May 2024	No	CARICOM, OAS
Ireland	28 May 2024	Yes	EU; Ireland–Palestine relations
Norway	28 May 2024	Yes	EFTA, NATO; Norway–Palestine relations
Spain	28 May 2024	Yes	EU, NATO; Palestine–Spain relations
Slovenia (disputed)	4 June 2024	Yes	EU, NATO; Palestine–Slovenia relations Further details In June 2024, the Slovenian government under Prime Minister Robert Golob extended recognition of Palestine. In June 2026, the new Prime Minister Janez Janša stated that he views this move to have been illegal, and announced that he plans to withdraw recognition of Palestine.
Armenia	21 June 2024	Yes	CSTO; Armenia–Palestine relations
Mexico	5 February 2025	Yes	G20, OAS; Mexico–Palestine relations Further details Mexico was listed in documents circulated at the United Nations in 2024 as having recognized Palestine on 2 June 2023, the same date that the State of Palestine announced the conversion of its "Special Delegation" in Mexico into an "Embassy" without specifying whether that was by agreement with the Mexican government. The State of Palestine was reportedly soon added to a list of embassies in Mexico on a Mexican government website, and at least one source would later credit Mexican president Andrés Manuel López Obrador with having affected the change. In a press release from 25 April 2024, the Mexican government stated that "Mexico has supported actions in several multilateral forums that have, among others, the legal effect of recognizing Palestine as a State.", and on 11 October 2024 Mexican President Claudia Sheinbaum said "we believe that the Palestinian State should be recognized in its full scope, just like the State of Israel." On 5 February 2025 Sheinbaum stated that "Mexico has had a position since years ago, not only of the governments of the Fourth Transformation, but it comes from before, of recognition of the State of Palestine and at the same time of the State of Israel. So that is the policy of the Mexican government of years ago and of now." Some media outlets reported that Mexico recognized Palestine on 19 March 2025 in reference to the accreditation ceremony for the first Palestinian representative to Mexico under the title of "Ambassador".
Canada	21 September 2025	No	G7, G20, NATO, OAS; Canada–Palestine relations
Australia	21 September 2025	No	G20, PIF; Australia–Palestine relations
United Kingdom	21 September 2025	Yes	G7, G20, NATO, UNSC (permanent); Palestine–United Kingdom relations
Portugal	21 September 2025	No	EU, NATO; Palestine–Portugal relations
France	22 September 2025	Yes	EU, G7, G20, NATO, UNSC (permanent); France–Palestine relations
Monaco	22 September 2025	No	—
Luxembourg	22 September 2025	Yes	EU, NATO; Luxembourg–Palestine relations
Malta	22 September 2025	Yes	EU; Malta–Palestine relations Further details While Malta was listed as having recognized Palestine on 16 November 1988 in documents circulated by the United Nations, they only acknowledged "the right of the Palestinian people to establish a sovereign state" at that time.
Andorra	22 September 2025	No	—
San Marino	23 September 2025	Yes	—

=== Non-UN member states ===
Name	Date of recognition	Diplomatic relations	Relevant membership, further details
Sahrawi Republic	15 November 1988	No	AU; Palestine–Sahrawi Republic relations Further details Palestine does not recognize the Sahrawi Republic.
Holy See	February 2013	Yes	—, Holy See–Palestine relations

== States that do not recognize Palestine ==
=== UN member states ===
Name	Official position	Diplomatic relations (Note: Either with the Palestinian National Authority, the Palestine Liberation Organization, or the State of Palestine. The institution is specified where known.)	Relevant memberships
Austria	Austria conferred full diplomatic status on the PLO representation in Vienna on 13 December 1978, under then-chancellor Bruno Kreisky. In June 2011, Foreign Minister Michael Spindelegger said that Austria "had not yet made up its mind whether to support a UN recognition of a Palestinian state", adding that he preferred to wait for a joint EU approach to the issue. He said: "We will decide at the last moment because it might still give [the two parties] the opportunity to bring the Middle East peace process back on track." Spindelegger also suggested that the EU draft its own version of the resolution. In July 2025, the Federal Chancellery of Christian Stocker stated that "many steps still lie ahead of recognition". Further details Austria was initially listed as having recognized the State of Palestine on 14 December 1988, in documents submitted to UNESCO in 1989 supporting to Palestine's application for membership. However, the submitting states (Algeria, Indonesia, Mauritania, Nigeria, Senegal and Yemen) later requested that Austria be removed from the list.	Yes	EU; Austria–Palestine relations
Belgium	In May 2024, Foreign Minister Hadja Lahbib stated that recognition was not up for discussion, but it would not be granted at the time, while Prime Minister Alexander De Croo stressed that recognition was "symbolic" and would not have "any impact in the field". In July 2025, Belgium stated that it would determine its position on recognition in early September 2025. In August 2025, Foreign Minister Maxime Prévot urged the Federal Parliament that Belgium must recognize Palestine as soon as possible, warning that any delay would jeopardize the country's credibility in the two-state solution. On 1 September 2025, Foreign Minister Maxime Prévot announced that Belgium will recognize Palestinian statehood at the 2025 UN General Assembly, provided that the last Israeli hostage has been released and Hamas "no longer exercises any form of governance over Palestine." On 22 September 2025, Prime Minister Bart De Wever declared that Belgium would not yet recognize Palestine de jure, reiterating the demands regarding Hamas. On 6 July 2026, De Wever instructed his government to begin the process of recognizing Palestine as Hamas was stepping away from governing Gaza.	Yes	EU, NATO; Belgium–Palestine relations
Cameroon	Cameroon officially supports a two-state solution. Although a member of the OIC, President Paul Biya has developed strong ties with Israel since the mid-1980s. This perceived friendship has soured the country's traditionally close ties with Arab states, many of whom have withdrawn longstanding economic development assistance and pressed Biya to support Palestinian interests. In August 2011, Israeli Prime Minister Netanyahu asked Biya to oppose the UN resolution that would admit Palestine as a member state.	Yes	AU, OIC
Croatia	Croatia formalized relations with the PLO on 31 March 2011. Former Croatian Prime Minister Jadranka Kosor stated in 2011 that her government supported the co-existence of Israel and Palestine as two independent states; however, Croatia abstained during voting on upgrading Palestine to non-member observer state status in the UN and on admission of Palestine to UNESCO. Former Croatian Foreign Minister Vesna Pusić stated on 24 October 2014 that "Croatia will most likely recognize Palestine soon". The Croatian government tends to favour Israel over Palestine as a commitment to the U.S., to whom Croatia is aligned, and the central quarters of the European Union of which Croatia has been a member since 2013. Croatia believes that if it were to recognize Palestine, this would frustrate its position with the EU and ties to the U.S., and also because the situation in the Middle East is complicated it feels there is no guarantee that there would be peace and further existence of the Jewish state if Israel eventually decides to withdraw from the occupied territories. In June 2025, President Zoran Milanović stated that Croatia should recognize Palestine. On 27 August 2025, Milanović declared that he will vigorously push for Croatia to recognize Palestine as soon as feasible within the bounds of his constitutional authority. He is also urging the government to start the process of recognizing Palestine in the Croatian Parliament. On 26 September 2025, a parliamentary motion to recognise Palestine, introduced by the political platform We Can!, was rejected by the governing majority led by the Croatian Democratic Union.	Yes	EU, NATO
Denmark	Danish Foreign Minister Lene Espersen met Abbas on 9 March 2011 to persuade him to return to negotiating with Israel. Espersen also extended Danish support to Palestinian national development. During the campaign for the 2011 elections, the largest opposition party argued that Denmark should recognize the State of Palestine. Foreign Minister Lene Espersen warned that such a unilateral decision could have "more negative than beneficial" consequences, and stressed the need to co-ordinate policy with the EU. In December 2014, a bill that called on Denmark to recognize Palestine as a state was rejected in the Danish parliament. In July 2025, Foreign Minister Lars Løkke Rasmussen responded to the planned recognition of Palestine by France, stating that Denmark preferred such recognition to stem from a negotiated two-state solution or a coordinated EU effort. In August 2025, Prime Minister Mette Frederiksen announced that Denmark would not recognize Palestine at this time because "it will not help the thousands of children who are currently fighting for their survival, no matter how much we might wish it." On 22 September 2025, Rasmussen stated Denmark would recognise Palestine after several conditions are met, including all hostages being released, disarming of Hamas, reforming of the Palestinian Authority, and Hamas having no role in the governance of Gaza in the future.	Yes	EU, NATO; Denmark–Palestine relations
Eritrea	Eritrea is one of only two African countries that do not recognize Palestine, the other being Cameroon. In October 2010, President Isaias Afewerki stated, "Israel needs a government, we must respect this. The Palestinians also need to have a dignified life, but it can not be the West Bank or Gaza. A two-state solution will not work. It's just to fool people. Israelis and Palestinians living in the same nation will never happen for many reasons. One option that may work is a Transjordan. Israel may be left in peace and the Palestinian and Jordanian peoples are brought together and can create their own nation." In his address to the UN General Assembly in 2011, Isaias stated that "Eritrea reaffirms its long-standing support to the right of the Palestinian people to self-determination and an independent, sovereign state. It also upholds the right of Israel to live in peace and security within internationally recognized boundaries." On 29 November 2012, Eritrea voted in favour of a resolution to make Palestine a non-member observer state at the UN. On 23 September 2024, the Minister for Foreign affairs H. E. Osman Saleh emphasized the Palestinians' right to self-determination. On 19 January 2025, the Ministry of Information released a press statement welcoming a ceasefire in the Gaza war implemented that day.	Yes	AU
Estonia	During a meeting with Riyad al-Malki in June 2010, Minister Urmas Paet said the country approved an agreement between the two countries and "self-determination for Palestine". Officials stated that the government would not adopt a position regarding the UN bid until the final wording of the resolution was published. On 30 July 2025, Estonian prime minister Kristen Michal emphasized that Estonia has no plans to recognize Palestine.	Yes	EU, NATO
Fiji	Fijian policy on the Israeli–Palestinian conflict is largely based on UN resolutions.	No	MSG, PIF
Finland	Finland supports a two-state solution to the conflict. In 2025, President Alexander Stubb stated that he is willing to approve recognition of Palestine if the government presses forward with such a proposal. Prime Minister Petteri Orpo stated that Finland is not preparing to recognize Palestine. In September 2025, he announced a set of conditions before recognition would be implemented.	Yes	EU, NATO; Finland–Palestine relations
Germany	In April 2011, Chancellor Angela Merkel labelled the Palestinian bid for recognition a "unilateral step", and stated unequivocally that Germany will not recognize a Palestinian state without its prior acceptance by Israel, "Unilateral recognitions therefore definitely do not contribute to achieving this aim ... This is our stance now and it will be our stance in September. There needs to be mutual recognition, otherwise it is not a two-state solution." She also reaffirmed her government's commitment to see an agreement reached as soon as possible, "We want a two-state solution. We want to recognize a Palestinian state. Let us ensure that negotiations begin. It is urgent." In August 2025, Chancellor Friedrich Merz said Germany would not recognize Palestine as it does not "see the requirements met". Further details The German Democratic Republic recognized the State of Palestine on 18 November 1988, but it later unified with the Federal Republic of Germany and the current government does not recognize it.	Yes	EU, G7, G20, NATO; Germany–Palestine relations
Greece	Under previous governments, Greece garnered a reputation as a staunch supporter of the Palestinian cause. Within the wider Arab–Israeli conflict, Andreas Papandreou maintained a stronger stand against Israel than any other government in the European Community. Diplomatic relations were founded with the PLO in 1981, while relations with Israel were maintained only at the consular level until Greece's formal recognition of Israel in 1990 under Konstantinos Mitsotakis. Since the formation of current foreign policy under George Papandreou, Greece has seen a rapid improvement in relations with Israel, leading the media to mark the conclusion of Greece's pro-Palestinian era. In December 2015, Greece's parliament voted in favour of a motion requesting that the government recognize Palestine. On 7 September 2025, Prime Minister Kyriakos Mitsotakis declared that Greece will recognize Palestinian statehood at the right time.	Yes	EU, NATO; Greece–Palestine relations
Israel	See above	Yes	
Italy	In May 2011, at an event in Rome celebrating Israel's independence, then Prime Minister Silvio Berlusconi pledged his country's support to Israel. In June, he reiterated Italy's position against unilateral actions on either side of the conflict, stressing that "peace can only be reached with a common initiative through negotiations". This position was shared by parliamentarians, who drafted a letter to the UN stating that "a premature, unilateral declaration of Palestinian statehood would ... undermine rather than resolve the Israeli–Palestinian peace process". Nevertheless, Italy upgraded the diplomatic status of the Palestinian delegation in Rome to a mission, similarly to what other EU countries were doing, giving the head of the delegation ambassadorial status. On 31 October 2011, Italy did not oppose Palestine's UNESCO membership bid. On 29 November 2012, Italy voted in favour of UN Resolution 67/19, giving Palestine a non-member observer state status at the UN. Italy's opposition to unilateral actions was reiterated on 21 December 2017, when it voted in favour of a UN draft resolution calling on all countries to comply with Security Council resolutions regarding the status of Jerusalem, following the decision by the U.S. to move its embassy to Israel from Tel Aviv to the city. In July 2025, both Prime Minister Giorgia Meloni and Foreign Minister Antonio Tajani stated that Italy was not ready to recognize Palestine and that such a move would be counterproductive. In September 2025, Meloni stated that Italy would recognize Palestine, given that all Israeli hostages are released and Hamas is excluded from the Palestinian government.	Yes	EU, G7, G20, NATO; Italy–Palestine relations
Japan	Japan supports a two-state solution to the conflict, and supports the establishment of a Palestinian state. In October 2007, a Japanese Justice Ministry official said: "Given that the Palestinian Authority has improved itself to almost a full-fledged state and issues its own passports, we have decided to accept the Palestinian nationality." The Japanese government declared that it would not recognize any act that would jeopardize a Palestinian state with the pre-1967 borders nor the annexation of East Jerusalem by Israel. Japan voted favourably for the UN General Assembly resolution to accord Palestine non-member observer state status in the UN in November 2012, and since then has referred to the country as "Palestine". Japan voted for Palestine’s full UN membership bid at the Security Council in April 2024. In August 2024, a Japanese official stated that the country was considering recognition. On 30 July 2025, Foreign Minister Takeshi Iwaya stated that, in contrast to France, Japan requires additional time before recognizing Palestine as a sovereign state; however, he reaffirmed Japan's continued commitment to a two-state solution. On 22 September 2025, Iwaya stated that Japan's recognition of Palestine as a state is a matter of "when" rather than "if".	Yes	G7, G20; Japan–Palestine relations
Kiribati	During the summit of the Pacific Islands Forum in early September 2011, the foreign minister of Kiribati reportedly expressed support for the Palestinian position.	No	PIF
Latvia	Latvia supports a two-state solution to the conflict and provides development assistance to the Palestinian National Authority. In July 2025, the Latvian foreign ministry reiterated that there were no plans to recognize Palestine.	Yes	EU, NATO
Liechtenstein	Liechtenstein relies on Switzerland to carry out most of its foreign affairs. In January 2011, it co-sponsored a draft resolution guaranteeing the Palestinian people's right to self-determination, and stated that this right must be exercised with a view to achieving a viable and fully sovereign Palestinian state. In September 2025, Foreign Minister Sabine Monauni stated that Palestine fundamentally met the requirements for statehood.	No	EFTA
Lithuania	Lithuania supports a two-state solution including an independent Palestinian state. In 2011, Foreign Minister Audronius Ažubalis called for a strong, unanimous European position that encouraged both parties to resume peace talks. In August 2025, a senior advisor to President Gitanas Nausėda stated that "at this time, the question of recognising Palestine is not on our agenda".	Yes	EU, NATO; Lithuania–Palestine relations
Marshall Islands	The Marshall Islands has, like the U.S., long been a close voting ally of Israel at the UN. In December 2017, the Marshall Islands was one of just nine countries (including the U.S. and Israel) to vote against a motion adopted by the UN General Assembly condemning the U.S.'s recognition of Jerusalem as Israel's capital city. Additionally, it was one of only five countries (the others being Israel, the U.S., Micronesia, and Nauru) to oppose a UN draft resolution in November 2020 on the creation of a Palestinian state.	No	PIF
Federated States of Micronesia	The Federated States of Micronesia (FSM) is a consistent supporter of Israel, especially in international resolutions, though this is due in part to its association with the U.S. Former FSM President Manny Mori said that the relationship goes back to 1986, when Israel made "[an] early decision to support Micronesia's membership in the UN". During the summit of the Pacific Islands Forum in September 2011, the leader of the Micronesian delegation reportedly stated his country's solidarity with the Palestinian people's suffering and support for their right to self-determination. Regarding the PNA's endeavour to gain admission to the UN, the official stated that the agreements signed with the U.S. prevented the FSM from voting according to its government's wishes in cases where they conflicted with those of the U.S. In reference to Israel's continued development assistance to Micronesians, another diplomat noted, "We need Israeli expertise, so I don't see a change in our policy anytime soon."	No	PIF
Moldova	On 27 May 2024, Foreign Minister Mihai Popșoi reaffirmed support of Moldova for the two-state solution; however, he also stated that there was no internal consensus on recognizing the State of Palestine.	Yes	
Myanmar	Myanmar is one of only two Asian members of the Non-Aligned Movement that has not recognized the State of Palestine, alongside Singapore. Former foreign affairs minister Win Aung stated in 2000 that Myanmar supports a two-state solution within internationally recognized borders.	No	ASEAN
Nauru	During the Pacific Islands Forum in early September 2011, Foreign Affairs Minister Kieren Keke confirmed his nation's solidarity with the Palestinian people and their right to self-determination. The PNA's foreign ministry published a statement prior to the summit claiming that most Pacific island nations would vote against a UN resolution regarding the Palestinian state.	No	PIF
Netherlands	The Netherlands supports a two-state solution, with the recognition of Palestine as a state seen as contingent upon successful negotiations that ensure the security and mutual recognition of both states. In August 2025, the Dutch foreign minister stated "The Netherlands is not planning to recognise a Palestinian state at this time."	Yes	EU, NATO; Netherlands–Palestine relations
New Zealand	New Zealand supports a two-state solution to the peace process. It also maintains a policy of tacit rather than explicit recognition of new states. For Palestine, this would mean upgrading its accredited delegation to a diplomatic status. In early September 2011, Foreign Minister Murray McCully said that the government would not make a decision until the wording of the resolution was released. "We've got a reputation for being fair minded and even handed on this matter and all we can do is wait to see the words. He also told Riyad al-Malki that his country had refused to give Israel any pledges to refuse to vote in favor of the draft resolution. Since 2017, Prime Minister Jacinda Ardern had reiterated her support for a two-state solution and opposition to settler expansions. On 26 September 2025, Foreign Minister Winston Peters announced that New Zealand was not ready to recognize a Palestinian state stating it did not meet the minimum criteria of statehood.	Yes	PIF; New Zealand–Palestine relations
North Macedonia	North Macedonia is one of the few countries with no political or diplomatic relations with Palestine, of any kind. Whilst he was Foreign Minister, Nikola Poposki stated that the country's position will be built in accordance with the views of the European Union and its strategic partners.	No	NATO
Palau	Palau is one of four countries (alongside the Marshall Islands, the Federated States of Micronesia and Nauru) that has almost always voted with the U.S. in bills at the UN. Palau, the Marshall Islands, Micronesia and the U.S. make up the Compact of Free Association, which some observers have suggested amounts to "checkbook diplomacy", whereby the U.S. bought the tiny island states' votes for cash. When the UN overwhelmingly voted to condemn Donald Trump's decision to recognize Jerusalem as Israel's capital and relocate the U.S. embassy there, Palau was one of only nine countries to support the move.	No	PIF
Panama	Panama is the only nation in Latin America which does not recognise Palestine, and is reported to be undecided on the matter. President Ricardo Martinelli has a record of supporting Israel in UN resolutions, and has reportedly resisted pressure from other Latin American governments to recognize Palestine. The Central American Integration System (SICA) was expected to adopt a joint position on the issue at its summit on 18 August, but Panama insisted that discussion should retain a regional focus and the matter was not included on the final agenda. In early September, Foreign Minister Roberto Henriquez said that the government's decision would not be made public until its vote is cast, but added, "It is very important that the birth of this country and its recognition in the international forum is previously accompanied by a full peace agreement with its neighbour, Israel." On 4 July 2015, Panama's Vice President and Foreign Minister Isabel De Saint Malo de Alvarado said that her government is looking at ways to recognize the State of Palestine without affecting their "close relationship" with Israel.	No	OAS
Samoa	In 2010, Prime Minister Tuilaʻepa Saʻilele Malielegaoi expressed support for a two-state solution to the conflict.	No	PIF
Singapore	Singapore has not recognized the State of Palestine. The island state has a strong relationship with Israel; however, Singapore established a representative office in Ramallah as a move to improve coordination of capacity-building initiatives and fortify relations with the Palestinian National Authority. On 2 July 2024, Foreign Minister Vivian Balakrishnan stated that Singapore could recognize Palestine if it in turn accepted Israel's right to exist. In July 2025, Singapore announced that it was "prepared in principle" to recognize Palestine. On 22 September 2025, Balakrishnan declared that Singapore will recognize Palestine once it has a competent administration, supports Israel's right to exist, and abandons terrorism.	Yes	ASEAN
Solomon Islands	Foreign Minister Peter Shannel Agovaka met Riyad al-Malki in early September 2011 at the summit of the Pacific Islands Forum in Wellington. Agovaka reportedly confirmed his government's support of Palestinian efforts at the UN, and that possible recognition of the State of Palestine would be considered in the next cabinet meeting. On 6 October 2025, Prime Minister Jeremiah Manele reaffirmed Solomon Islands' support for a two-state solution but said that the country was not yet prepared to recognise the State of Palestine, citing the need for a ceasefire, clearly defined boundaries for Palestine and the safety of humanitarian workers before recognition.	No	PIF
South Korea	The government of South Korea does not recognize the State of Palestine; however, it has a representative office in Ramallah. South Korea voted for Palestine's full UN membership bid at the Security Council in April 2024.	Yes	G20; Palestine–South Korea relations
Switzerland	Switzerland does not recognize Palestine as an independent state but voted in favour of granting it a non-member observer status at the UN in November 2014. Swiss President Simonetta Sommaruga voiced her support for a two-state solution in 2015, saying: "Switzerland has worked for years for a solution to the conflict between Israel and Palestine. Our aim is to achieve peace." On April 28, 2026, in Switzerland's National Council, most conservatives and centrists rejected recognizing State of Palestine over neutrality and mediation concerns, while left-leaning lawmakers supported recognition as a step toward a two-state solution.	Yes	EFTA; Palestine–Switzerland relations
Tonga	In September 2011, following the summit of the Pacific Islands Forum in Wellington, the PNA's foreign ministry noted that it had made significant strides in its efforts to attain recognition from Tonga.	No	PIF
Tuvalu	On 10 September 2015, the UN General Assembly passed a Palestinian resolution to allow its flag to fly in front of the UN headquarters in New York. The vote was passed with 119 votes in support, 8 opposing, and 45 abstentions. Tuvalu was one of the eight opposing votes.	No	PIF
United States	In September 2011, President Barack Obama declared U.S. opposition to the bid in his speech to the General Assembly, saying that "genuine peace can only be realized between Israelis and Palestinians themselves", and that "[u]ltimately, it is Israelis and Palestinians – not us – who must reach an agreement on the issues that divide them". Obama told Abbas that the U.S. would veto any UN Security Council move to recognize Palestinian statehood. Presidents Donald Trump and Joe Biden have maintained that UNSC veto policy. In August 2025, U.S. Vice President JD Vance reaffirmed that the U.S. would not recognize Palestine, stating: "I don't know what it would mean to really recognise a Palestinian state, given the lack of functional government there."	Yes	G7, G20, NATO, OAS, UNSC (permanent); Palestine–United States relations

=== Non-UN member states ===
Name	Official position	Relations	Relevant memberships
Kosovo		No	
Sovereign Military Order of Malta	The Order of Malta has relations at ambassador level with the Palestinian Authority.	Yes	
Republic of China (Taiwan)	Taiwan does not recognise the State of Palestine, while the government of Taiwan is "closely monitoring the latest developments on the issue" and calls on "all parties to show self-restraint ... and resolve differences through ongoing communication". On 22 September 2025, the Ministry of Foreign Affairs (MOFA) criticised a map released by the Permanent Observer Mission of Palestine colouring the island of Taiwan as "recognised", which suggested that Taiwan is part of China, and said that Taiwan "has no immediate plan to recognise a Palestinian state". MOFA also cited a strategic partnership between China and Palestine in which Palestine affirmed that Taiwan is an "inalienable part of China's territory."	No	Palestine–Taiwan relations

== Multilateral treaties ==
The State of Palestine is a party to several multilateral treaties, registered with five depositaries: the United Kingdom, UNESCO, UN, the Netherlands and Switzerland. The ratification of the UNESCO conventions took place in 2011/2012 and followed Palestine becoming a member of UNESCO, while the ratification of the other conventions were performed in 2014 while negotiations with Israel were at an impasse.

Depositary country/organization	Depositary organ	Number of treaties	Examples	Date of first ratification/accession
Netherlands	Ministry of Foreign Affairs	1	Convention respecting the laws and customs of war on land	2 April 2014
Russia		1	Treaty on the Non-Proliferation of Nuclear Weapons	10 February 2015
Switzerland	Federal Council	7	Geneva Conventions and Protocols	2 April 2014
UNESCO	Director-General	8	Convention concerning the Protection of the World Cultural and Natural Heritage	8 December 2011
United Nations	Secretary-General	>50	Vienna Convention on Diplomatic Relations, Statute of the International Criminal Court	9 April 2014
United Kingdom	Foreign and Commonwealth Office	2	UNESCO Constitution, Treaty on the Non-Proliferation of Nuclear Weapons	23 November 2011

In an objection of 16 May 2014, Israel informed the Secretary General of the UN that it did not consider that Palestine met the definition of statehood and that its requested accession to the UN Convention against Torture as being "without legal validity and without effect upon Israel's treaty relations under the Convention". The U.S. and Canada lodged similar objections.

Palestine participated in the negotiation of the UN Treaty on the Prohibition of Nuclear Weapons and voted in favour of its adoption on 7 July 2017.

== See also ==
- Foreign relations of Palestine
- History of the State of Palestine
- International recognition of Israel
- List of states with limited recognition
- Palestine–European Union relations
- Palestinian nationalism – Movement for self-determination and sovereignty of Palestine
- Right to exist – Conceptual right of nations
- Status of Jerusalem – Legal and diplomatic status
