= Brunei–Palestine relations =

- Brunei: Palestine

Brunei–Palestine relations refer to foreign relations between Brunei Darussalam and the State of Palestine. Brunei supports the creation of an independent Palestine based on the 1967 borders with East Jerusalem as its capital.

Brunei does not have diplomatic ties with Israel. It does recognize the State of Palestine. Walid Abu Ali is the non-resident Ambassador of Palestine to Brunei.

== History ==
The Sultan of Brunei spoke at the United Nations General Assembly session in September 1984 after joining the United Nations where he condemned Israel and expressed support for a Palestinian State. On 17 November 1988, Brunei recognized Palestine following the Palestinian Declaration of Independence.

Brunei voted against the United States recognizing Jerusalem as the capital of Israel at the United Nations. The resolution stated the issue of Jerusalem would be settled through negotiations between Palestinians and Israelis.

Brunei provides donations to Palestine through the United Nations Relief and Works Agency for Palestine Refugees in the Near East (UNRWA). It provided food for Ramadan in 2019 and funding for education and healthcare in 2020. It raised funds through The Palestine Humanitarian Fund 2021 initiative and provided 115,860 food packets to UNRWA.

Brunei, Indonesia and Malaysia issued a joint statement during the Gaza war, condemning Israeli actions and calling for a ceasefire. All three Muslim majority Southeast Asian countries do not have diplomatic ties with Israel. McDonald's franchisee in Brunei donated to a fund for Palestinians in Gaza. Thousands protested in Bandar Seri Begawan in solidarity with the Palestinians.

== See also ==
- Foreign relations of Brunei
- Foreign relations of Palestine
- International recognition of Palestine
- Barisan Revolusi Nasional
