= Nigeria–Palestine relations =

- Nigeria: Palestine

Nigeria–Palestine relations refer to foreign relations between Nigeria and Palestine. Nigeria supports a two-state solution to the Israel-Palestine conflict. Abu Shawesh is the Ambassador of Palestine to Nigeria. Nura Abba Rimi is the ambassador of Nigeria to Palestine.

== History ==
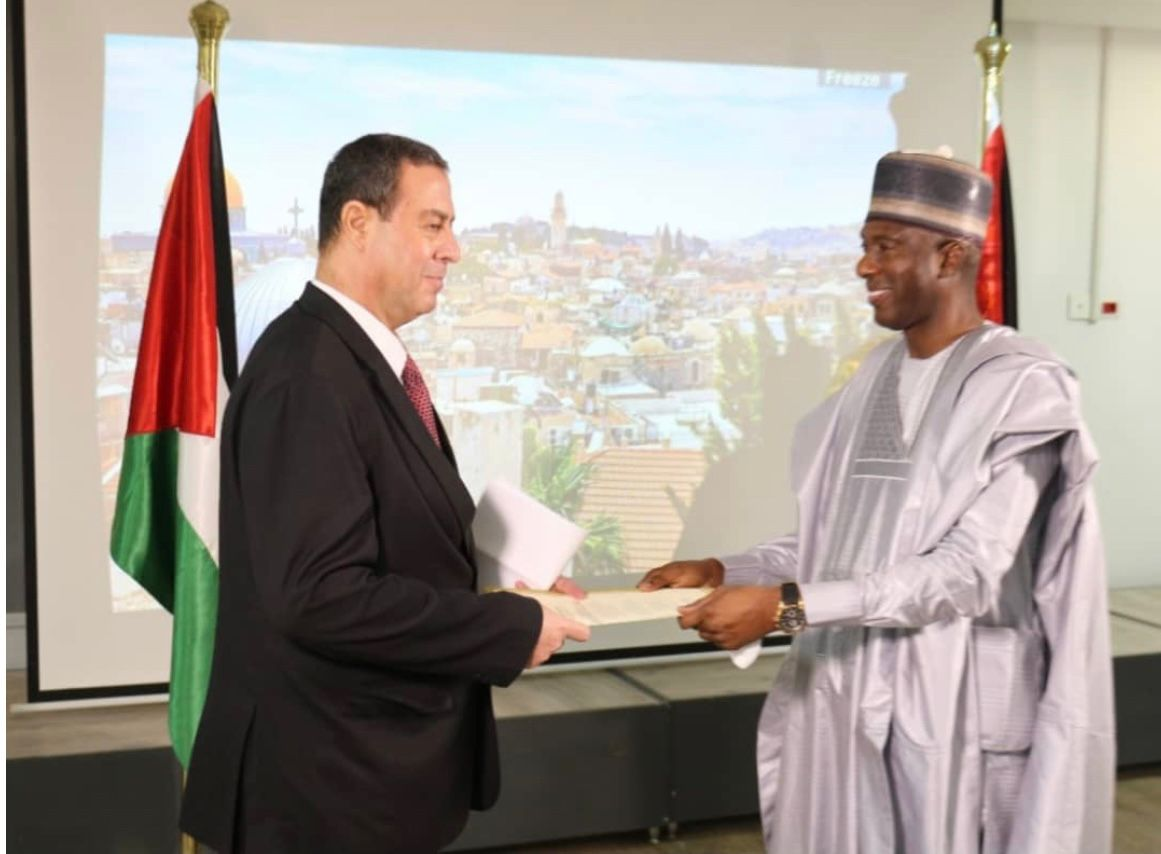
Presentation of Letter of Credence to the State of Palestine by Ambassador Nura Abba RImi

Nigeria recognized Palestinian statehood on 18 November 1988. Nigeria has voted in favor of Palestine at the United Nations.

In 2012, Nigeria voted in favor of Palestine becoming a non-member observer at the United Nations, member of UNESCO, but voted against full member status at the United Nations.

== See also ==
- Foreign relations of Nigeria
- Foreign relations of Palestine
- International recognition of Palestine
