= Bolivia–Palestine relations =

- Bolivia: Palestine

Bolivia–Palestine relations refer to foreign relations between Bolivia and Palestine. Mahmoud Elalwani is the ambassador of Palestine to Bolivia. Bolivia supports the establishment of a two-state solution and has recognised the independence of Palestine since 2010.

== History ==
On 28 November 1918, the Committee for the Liberty of Palestine, according to the organization representing four thousand Syrians and Palestinians in Bolivia, petitioned the British Counsel in La Paz. They, many Christians, mentioned they were worried that "oppressive Ottoman rule" would be replaced with "Isralitish Danger".

Ayman Altaramsi, a doctor from Gaza, represented Palestine in Bolivia in the 2010s. Mahmoud Elalwany was Palestine's ambassador to Bolivia in 2024, and Ahmed Al-Asaad was the ambassador to Bolivia in 2026.

Movement to Socialism member Evo Morales broke ties with Israel during the 2008 Gaza War. Bolivia formally recognised Palestine as an independent country using the 1967 borders on 17 December 2010. During the 2014 Gaza War, Bolivia called Israel a terrorist state and increased cooperation on health, media, and sport. Ties between the two countries were re-established in 2019 by then-president Jeanine Áñez, but were severed again on 31 October 2023 during the Gaza war, with president Luis Arce accusing the Israeli government of committing war crimes against Palestinians in Gaza. María Nela Prada, another member of the Movement to Socialism, called for an end to Israeli bombing of Gaza and called for actions to avoid genocide in Gaza. Israel condemned Bolivia and called its decision a "surrender to terrorism".

== See also ==
- Foreign relations of Bolivia
- Foreign relations of Palestine
- International recognition of Palestine
