= Namibia–Palestine relations =

- Namibia: Palestine

Namibia–Palestine relations refer to foreign relations between Namibia and Palestine.

Namibia supports a two-state solution to the Israel-Palestine conflict. Hanan Jarrar is the ambassador of Palestine to Namibia based in South Africa.

== History ==
Namibia established ties with Palestine on 19 November 1988.

Some organizations in Namibia called for an end to relations with Israel due to the Israeli–Palestinian conflict. The National Society for Human Rights of Namibia called for the ending of relations in 2002 due to "the persistent denial, by the State of Israel, of the inalienable right to self-determination for the people of Palestine". During the 2008–2009 Gaza War, opposition parties SWANU and the Namibian Democratic Movement for Change called for the severing of relations with Israel.

A number of op-eds were written criticizing Israel and Namibia's relationship with it. In January 2008, Alexactus Kaure, a Namibian academic and writer, wrote an op-ed piece published in the state-run New Era newspaper which criticized Namibia's relations with Israel, calling them controversial and comparing them to relations with apartheid South Africa. A year later during the Gaza War, Herbert Jauch, head of research and education at Namibia's Labour Resource and Research Institute published an op-ed in the New Era calling Israel's actions "...an act of cold-blooded murder and a crime against humanity", while calling for the international isolation of Israel.

The South West Africa People's Organisation and the Palestine Liberation Organization have had historical ties. Palestinian International Cooperation Agency visited Namibia in 2019.

During the Gaza war, Namibia called for a ceasefire. Namibia was critical of Germany for defending Israel at the International Court of Justice against the charges of genocide of Palestinians brought by South Africa. President Hage Geingob urged Germany to reconsider its intervention. Namibia has supported South Africa's case.

== See also ==
- Foreign relations of Namibia
- Foreign relations of Palestine
- International recognition of Palestine
