= Burkina Faso–Palestine relations =

- Palestine: Burkina Faso

Burkina Faso and Palestine relations refers to the current and historical relationship between Palestine and Burkina Faso. Neither state maintains an embassy in the capital of the other, but the Palestine Liberation Organization (PLO) has a non-resident representative to the Burkinabé government.

Relations between the Palestinian movement and Burkina Faso have been close since the government of President Sangoulé Lamizana, long time ruler of what was then the Republic of Upper Volta. Lamizana, who seized power in the 1966 Upper Voltan coup d'état, replaced the strongly pro-Israeli position of President Maurice Yaméogo with new friendly relations with the Arab world, especially regarding countries involved in the Arab–Israeli conflict. For example, in 1972 he visited Egypt, pledging full support to the anti-Israeli cause.

On 21 November 1988, a week after the Palestinian Declaration of Independence, President Blaise Compaoré recognized the State of Palestine declared by the PLO. Since then Burkina Faso has gone on to support a number of United Nations General Assembly resolutions in favour of Palestine, such as in 2012.

== See also ==
- Foreign relations of Burkina Faso
- Foreign relations of the Palestine Liberation Organization
- International recognition of Palestine
