= Palestine–Zimbabwe relations =

- Palestine: Zimbabwe

Palestine–Zimbabwe relations refer to foreign relations between Palestine and Zimbabwe.

Palestine has an embassy in Harare, Zimbabwe. Tamer Almassri is the ambassador of Palestine to Zimbabwe.

== History ==
In 1988, Zimbabwe recognized Palestine, the first African country to do so. ZANU-PF ties to the Palestinian movement date back to their liberation struggle against Rhodesia. Palestinian International Cooperation Agency opened a branch in Zimbabwe in July 2019. Zimbabwe joined the Southern African Development Community in supporting Palestine in 2021.

In February 2023, President Emmerson Mnangagwa met with the Prime Minister of Palestine Mohammad Shtayyeh, in Ethiopia at the African Union summit. Riyad al-Maliki, Minister of Foreign Affairs of Palestine, visited Zimbabwe in March 2023 and signed a number of memorandum of understandings. He met President Emmerson Mnangagwa.

In December, Zimbabwe donated US$35 thousand to the Palestinian embassy in Harare during the Gaza war.

== See also ==
- Foreign relations of Zimbabwe
- Foreign relations of Palestine
- International recognition of Palestine
