= Kyrgyzstan–Palestine relations =

- Kyrgyzstan: Palestine

Kyrgyzstan–Palestine relations refer to foreign relations between Kyrgyzstan and the State of Palestine.

Kyrgyzstan supports the creation of an independent Palestinian State. Javad Awad is the Ambassador of Palestine to Kyrgyzstan. The ambassador of Palestine to Kyrgyzstan is based in Tashkent, Uzbekistan.

== History ==
Kyrgyzstan established diplomatic ties with Palestine on 12 September 1995.

In October 2021, Ambassador of Palestine to the Kyrgyzstan, Mohammad Tarshakhani, met the Deputy Minister of Foreign Affairs, Foreign Trade and Investments, Aibek Artykbaev, discussed ways to increase cooperation in agriculture and healthcare.

Riyad Al-Maliki, Minister of Foreign Affairs and Expatriates of Palestine, visited Kyrgyzstan and met with the President Sadyr Japarov in August 2023. Palestine also announced plans to open an embassy in Kyrgyzstan. President of Palestine Mahmoud Abbas met with President Sadyr Japarov in June 2023.

In October 2023, the Jogorku Kenesh, the national assembly of Kyrgyzstan, voted to provide aid to Palestine. The government of Kyrgyzstan have provided tacit approval to pro-Palestinian protests. Kyrgyzstan asked for the stopping of hostilities and to begin dialogue for peace during the Gaza war. It voted at the United Nations for a humanitarian truce. President Sadyr Zhaparov expressed "deep concern" over the war in Gaza. It also warned its citizens to not join the conflict. Zhaparov promised to support Palestine in the United Nations and the Organization of Islamic Cooperation. He also accused the international community of double standards. It provided aid to the Palestinians during the war. Javad Awad, Ambassador of Palestinian to Kyrgyzstan, met with the Foreign Minister of Kyrgyzstan in November 2023.

== See also ==
- Foreign relations of Kyrgyzstan
- Foreign relations of Palestine
- International recognition of Palestine
