= Afghanistan–Palestine relations =

- Afghanistan: Palestine

Afghanistan–Palestine relations refer to diplomatic relations between Afghanistan and the State of Palestine.

== History ==
Afghanistan recognized the Palestinian National Council's declaration of independence in October 1948, making it the first non-Arab country to do so. Afghanistan officially recognized Palestinian statehood on 16 November 1988.

In 2019, Afghanistan donated US$ one million to United Nations Relief and Works Agency for Palestine Refugees (UNRWA). This was preceded by the United States stopping aid to UNRWA.

Amidst the 2021 Israel–Palestine crisis, the Islamic Republic of Afghanistan expressed its condemnation of Israeli attacks against Palestinians.

In August 2021, Mullah Abdul Ghani Baradar of the Taliban met with Ismail Haniyeh of Hamas in Doha, Qatar. In October 2022, Taliban official Zabihullah Mujahid met with Ismail Haniyeh in Turkey. Sirajuddin Haqqani, Interior Minister of Afghanistan, met with religious scholars from Palestine in January 2023.

Since the onset of the Gaza war in October, the Taliban has increasingly expressed its opposition to Israel. The group has urged both the United Nations, the Organization of Islamic Cooperation (OIC) and Muslim countries to take a firm stance in support of Palestine. On April 10, 2024, Foreign Minister Mawlawi Amir Khan Muttaqi conveyed his condolences to then-Hamas leader Ismail Haniyeh during a conversation regarding the killing of children and other family members of Haniyeh by the IDF. Several rallies have also been held in Kabul in solidarity with the Palestinian cause.

The Taliban have condemned various actions which they consider violations of international law, including the expansion of settlements in the West Bank, the attack on Rafah, and the bombing of Al-Mamdani Hospital in Gaza. The group has repeatedly called for a ceasefire, describing the invasion of Gaza as a genocide and characterizing Israeli policies as apartheid.

The Taliban have also denounced Israeli attacks on Lebanon, Syria and Yemen.

On October 17, 2024, following the killing of Hamas leader Yahya Sinwar, the official newspaper of the Taliban issued a statement in which the Taliban offered their condolences. The following day, Prime Minister Muhammad Hasan Akhund also released a message of condolence on the killing of Yahya Sinwar. In January 2025, Gaza Mosque was inaugurated in Kabul in order to express solidarity with the Palestinian people.

== See also ==
- Foreign relations of Afghanistan
- Foreign relations of Palestine
- International recognition of Palestine
- Iran–Palestine relations
