= Palestine–Thailand relations =

- Palestine: Thailand

Palestine–Thailand relations were formalized on 1 August 2012, after the Kingdom of Thailand recognized the State of Palestine as a sovereign state on 18 January 2012. Palestine has a non-resident embassy in Kuala Lumpur, which is accredited to the Thai side, and the Thai embassy in Amman is accredited to the Palestinian side. Both countries are members of the Asia Cooperation Dialogue and the Non-Aligned Movement.

== History ==
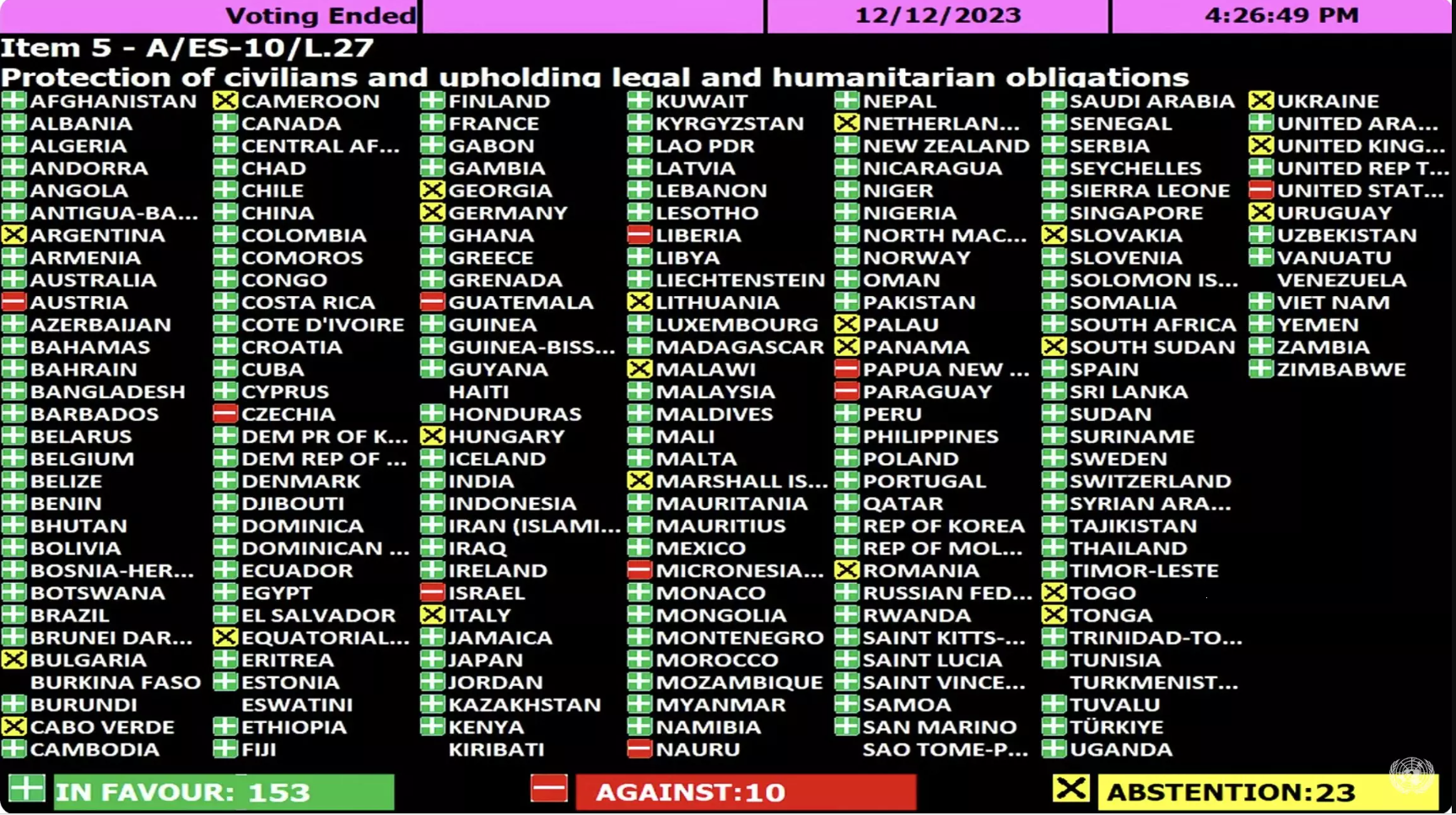
153 countries, including Thailand, supported the resolution calling for a ceasefire in Gaza that was overwhelmingly passed by the UN General Assembly on 12 December 2023

During the 2014 Gaza War, the Thai government supported a peaceful solution to the conflict and called on both Israel and Palestine to show restraint. It further stated that it will continue to support both sides, but will not condone terrorist activities by either side.

In 2016, President Mahmoud Abbas visited Thailand and met with then Prime Minister Prayut Chan-o-cha.

== Post-October 7 attacks ==
During the October 7, 2023 Hamas attacks on Israel , 44 Thai citizens were killed, and 31 were kidnapped into the Gaza Strip and held hostage by Hamas. Two of them died in captivity. 23 of the 31 Thai nationals held hostage were released during the November 2023 ceasefire.

As a response to the Gaza War, Thai Prime Minister Srettha Thavisin expressed his deepest condolences to the government and people of Israel, and condemned Hamas' attack. He also put the Royal Thai Air Force on standby to evacuate its citizens if needed. Deputy foreign affairs minister Jakkapong Sangmanee later said that the country's position was "one of neutrality" and that the government favoured "a solution that would allow Palestine and Israel to coexist."

On 27 October 2023, Thailand was one of 121 countries to vote in favor of a General Assembly resolution calling for an immediate ceasefire to the Gaza war.

In order to strengthen bilateral ties, Walid Abu Ali, Palestine's ambassador to Thailand, who resides in Kuala Lumpur, paid a courtesy call on Parnpree Bahiddha-nukara, the Thai government's deputy prime minister and minister of foreign affairs, on 12 January 2024. In addition to expressing satisfaction with the more than 12-year-old connection, both parties stated that they were willing to work toward furthering it in any areas where there may be mutual interest, especially in the promotion of trade and tourism.

In February 2025, five Thai nationals returned home after being held hostage by Hamas.

== See also ==
- Israel–Thailand relations
