= Comoros–Palestine relations =

- Comoros: Palestine

Comoros–Palestine relations refer to foreign relations between the Comoros and Palestine.

Both nations are members of the Arab League, Non-Aligned Movement and the Organization of Islamic Cooperation.

== History ==
The Comoros recognized Palestinian statehood on 21 November 1988.

In May 2013, the Comoros asked the International Criminal Court to investigate Israel for the 2010 Gaza flotilla raid on MV Mavi Marmara which was headed to Gaza. Although Israel is not a member of the ICC, the lawyer said the Mavi Marmara was sailing under flag of the Comoros and many Turks were on board. In May 2013, Fatou Bensouda, the Chief Prosecutor of the International Criminal Court, opened a preliminary examination into the incident after the Government of Comoros, under whose flag the Mavi Marmara was sailing, filed a complaint. In November 2014, Bensouda decided not to pursue the case, declaring that the possible crimes were not grave enough to fall within the scope of the court. The government of the Comoros appealed the decision, and in June 2015, three judges of a Pre-Trial Chamber of the ICC ruled that the prosecutor made material errors in her assessment of the incident's gravity and requested that the investigation be reopened in a 2–1 majority. Bensouda appealed the decision in July 2015, citing the opinion of the dissenting judge and errors made by the majority, claiming that the Pre-Trial Chamber had exceeded its mandate by applying a strict and mistaken standard to review the decision, and that the interpretation of the legal standard required of her was faulty. Prosecutor Fatou Bensouda refused to prosecute the case again in 2019.

In October 2021, Israeli media reported that the Comoros planned to establish ties with Israel.

In June 2023, the Comoros agreed to attend the Negev Forum which includes Israel. In November 2023, the Comoros joined the South African case at the International Criminal Court to investigate the situation in Gaza during the Gaza war.

== See also ==
- Foreign relations of the Comoros
- Foreign relations of Palestine
- International recognition of Palestine
