= Morocco–Palestine relations =

Diplomatic relations between the Kingdom of Morocco and the State of Palestine

- Morocco: Palestine

Relationship between the Kingdom of Morocco and the State of Palestine has been historically deep, yet complicated. Morocco has a consulate in Gaza while Palestine has an embassy in Rabat.

== History ==
Morocco and Palestine share a common Arab heritage, where the Arabs from Levant brought Arabic language and Islam to North Africa, bringing Islam and Arabian/Levantine culture to the native North African population. However, once the Arab Caliphates fell in 13th century due to Mongol conquest, histories of both countries diverged the same time: Morocco became the independent Arab-Berber Kingdom while Palestine would be exchanged between the Mamluks and the Persians, before finally annexed into the Ottoman territory for the next 400 years. The two later found themselves occupied by Spain, France, and Britain, experiencing varied forms of colonialism in process, though both were equally oppressive.

== Contemporary relations ==
When the European empires began to abandon their colonial possessions in the MENA after World War II, with Britain leaving Palestine in 1947, news about the 1948 Arab–Israeli War and the defeat of the Arab armies to the Jewish force had culminated into the anti-Jewish riots in Oujda and Jerada in solidarity with their Palestinian brethren, when Morocco was still a Franco-Spanish protectorate. Hassan II commanded Moroccan troops to assist the Arab coalition in the Ramadan War in solidarity with Palestine.

Meanwhile, Palestinians have shown greater sympathy to Morocco's neighbour and arch-rival Algeria and her ally Sahrawi Arab Democratic Republic due to similar revolutionary ideology, which affected the relations with Morocco despite Moroccan population's general support for Palestinian cause. Early leaders of the Palestine Liberation Organization (PLO) such as George Habash (who later founded Popular Front for the Liberation of Palestine) and Nayef Hawatmeh encountered El-Ouali Mustapha Sayed and Brahim Ghali in 1970s, where he expressed support for Western Saharan struggle and Polisario against Morocco. The rift between Morocco and the Palestinian nationalists almost widened when Hassan II sought to make a separate peace with Israel by hosting President Shimon Peres in 1986, but the Moroccan King subsequently backtracked from the original plan. Following the end of Cold War, Morocco and Palestine entered two decades of relatively stable relations.

=== Recent years ===
On 6 October 2023, the day before the Hamas launched an attack on Israel, Morocco's Minister of Foreign Affairs Nasser Bourita met with Hussein al-Sheikh, Secretary of the Executive Committee of the Palestine Liberation Organization, and reaffirmed Morocco’s unwavering support for the Palestinian cause. Thousands of Moroccans took it to the street to protest against Israeli occupation and to stand in solidarity with Palestine. Many Israeli flags were burned during the protest and many called to denounce the Israel–Morocco normalization agreement. Many political parties called on the people to boycott Israeli products. On 24 October 2023, King Mohammed VI instructed to send two military planes filled with humanitarian aid to Palestinian populations. Morocco provided water, food and medicine to Gaza in coordination with the Egyptian Red Crescent.

Humanitarian Cooperation

Morocco regularly launches humanitarian initiatives to support the Palestinian people, such as sending medical and food aid to the residents of Gaza and the West Bank. These initiatives are directed by King Mohammed VI, reflecting Morocco's enduring commitment to supporting Palestinians. On June 24, 2024, King Mohammed VI instructed the launch of a humanitarian operation aimed at providing medical assistance to the Palestinian population in Gaza. This aid comprises forty tons of medical supplies, including equipment for treating burns, emergency surgical and orthopedic supplies, and essential medicines. These medical materials are intended for both adults and young children.

Political Relations

The political relations between Palestine and Morocco are characterized by their strength and robustness, grounded in deep historical ties and strong fraternal bonds. This cooperation spans various fields, with mutual official visits at different levels, enhancing dialogue and cooperation between the Palestinian and Moroccan leaderships. Invited by the Bayt Mal Al-Quds Agency, a Palestinian delegation made an official visit to the Kingdom of Morocco from June 26 to June 28, 2024. This visit is part of the ongoing cooperation and consultation between the Bayt Mal Al-Quds Agency and Palestinian partners to prioritize interventions in Jerusalem, particularly in light of recent developments.

== See also ==
- Embassy of Palestine, Rabat
- Israel–Morocco relations
- Palestine–Sahrawi Arab Democratic Republic relations
