= Oman–Palestine relations =

- Oman: Palestine

Oman–Palestine relations refer to foreign relations between the Sultanate of Oman and the State of Palestine. Palestine has an embassy in Muscat. Dr Tayser Farahat is the Ambassador of the State of Palestine to Oman.

Oman does not recognize the State of Israel and refuses to do so until the Palestinian issue is resolved. It has stated that the creation of an independent Palestinian state is required for the normalization of relationship with Israel.

== History ==
Said bin Taimur, Sultan of Oman, did not allow Palestinians to enter Oman. While his successor, Qaboos bin Said, supported Palestinian aspirations it was against the Palestinian Liberation Organization which support separatists in the Dhofar War. In 1988, Oman recognized the state of Palestine and in 1989 Yasser Arafat visited Oman. In 1995, Oman and Palestine agreed to the opening of diplomatic outposts in Oman and West Bank.

Yusuf bin Alawi bin Abdullah, Minister Responsible for Foreign Affairs of Oman, visited President Mahmoud Abbas in Ramallah in October 2018. The same year, Benjamin Netanyahu, Prime Minister of Israel, visited Oman. In June 2019, Oman announced plans to open an embassy in Ramallah and a diplomatic delegation visited Ramallah in August to begin formalities. In 2020, Oman's parliament voted to criminalize ties with Israel. Oman participated in an extraordinary meeting of the Organisation of Islamic Cooperation following the Gaza war and called for the establishment of an independent Palestinian state and end of the Israeli occupation. It described Israel's occupation of Palestinian territories illegal and reiterated its support for a two-state solution. It called for a neutral investigation of Israel's actions in the war.

== See also ==
- Foreign relations of Oman
- Foreign relations of Palestine
- International recognition of the State of Palestine
