= Palestine–Qatar relations =

- Palestine: Qatar

Palestine–Qatar relations refer to foreign relations between Qatar and Palestine. Palestine has an embassy in Doha, Qatar. Munir Abdullah Ghannam is the ambassador of Palestine to Qatar. Mohamed Al-Emadi is the ambassador of Qatar to Palestine.

== History ==
The relations of Qatar and Palestine Liberation Organization declined during the First Gulf War in the early 1990s due to the PLO supporting Iraq.

In 2006, after the election of Hamas in Gaza both Turkey and Qatar claimed Hamas to be a legitimate government. This drew both countries closer on the Palestine issue.

Qatar severed diplomatic ties with Israel in 2009 due to Operation Cast Lead. It had established ties in 1996. In 2010, Qatar twice offered to restore trade relations with Israel and allow the reinstatement of the Israeli mission in Doha, on the condition that Israel allow Qatar to send building materials and money to Gaza to help rehabilitate infrastructure, and that Israel make a public statement expressing appreciation for Qatar's role and acknowledging its standing in the Middle East. Israel refused on the grounds that Qatari supplies could be used by Hamas to build bunkers and reinforced positions from which to fire rockets at Israeli cities and towns, and that Israel did not want to get involved in the competition between Qatar and Egypt over the Middle East mediation. However, Qatar did mediation talks with Hamas and Israeli officials. Khaled Mashal lobbied Hamas to move closer towards Qatar.

In 2012, Hamas opened a political office in Qatar. It provides a US$30 million stipend to Gaza which pays for fuel and salaries for civil servants. Hamad bin Khalifa Al Thani, Emir of Qatar, visited Gaza in 2012. It pays Hamas US$1 billion a year. Arrangements exist between Qatar and Israel for aid to Palestinians in Gaza supported by the United States.

On 9 March 2015, Qatar's ambassador to Gaza reportedly sought direct approval from Israel to import construction material into the Gaza Strip after Egypt had refused to allow the Qatari delegation through the Rafah border crossing. The Palestinian Authority and Fatah lashed out at Qatar, condemning their efforts to engage in direct communication with Israel. Jihad Harb, a political analyst and author, claimed that Qatar "might assume the role of mediator between Gaza and Israel, thus usurping the roles of the PA and Egypt."

In January 2017, the Qatar Committee for the Reconstruction of Gaza of Qatar announced plans to build an embassy in Gaza.

In December 2018, Israel permitted a €13 million payment from Qatar to Gazan workers as part of a six monthly payment to help with humanitarian crisis in the Gaza region. There have been frequent talks between Israel and Qatar on matters relating to Gaza since 2014 via Qatar's envoy to Gaza Mohammed al-Emadi who has been in regular contact with Israel.

Qatar hosted the chiefs of Central Intelligence Agency and Mossad during the Gaza war to negotiate the release of hostages from Hamas. In November 2023, Israeli soldiers graffitied the consulate of Qatar in Gaza with the Star of David. The consulate building was heavily damaged in the war. The headquarters of the Qatar Committee for the Reconstruction of Gaza of Qatar was targeted in Gaza by Israel. This was condemned by Oman.

On 6 March 2024, Qatar delivered 34 tons of aid, including food, to Gaza through the Qatari Red Crescent. In total, the Qatar Emiri Air Force sent more than 80 aid planes and evacuated 18 batches of injured Palestinians.

In December 2024, Fatah, which governs the Palestinian Authority, condemned the Qatari network Al Jazeera for its coverage of clashes between Palestinian security forces and Islamist militants in the Jenin refugee camp. Accusing the network of sowing division "in our Arab homeland in general and in Palestine in particular," Fatah called on Palestinians to avoid cooperating with Al Jazeera.

== Qatar's Mediation in the Palestinian-Israeli Conflict ==
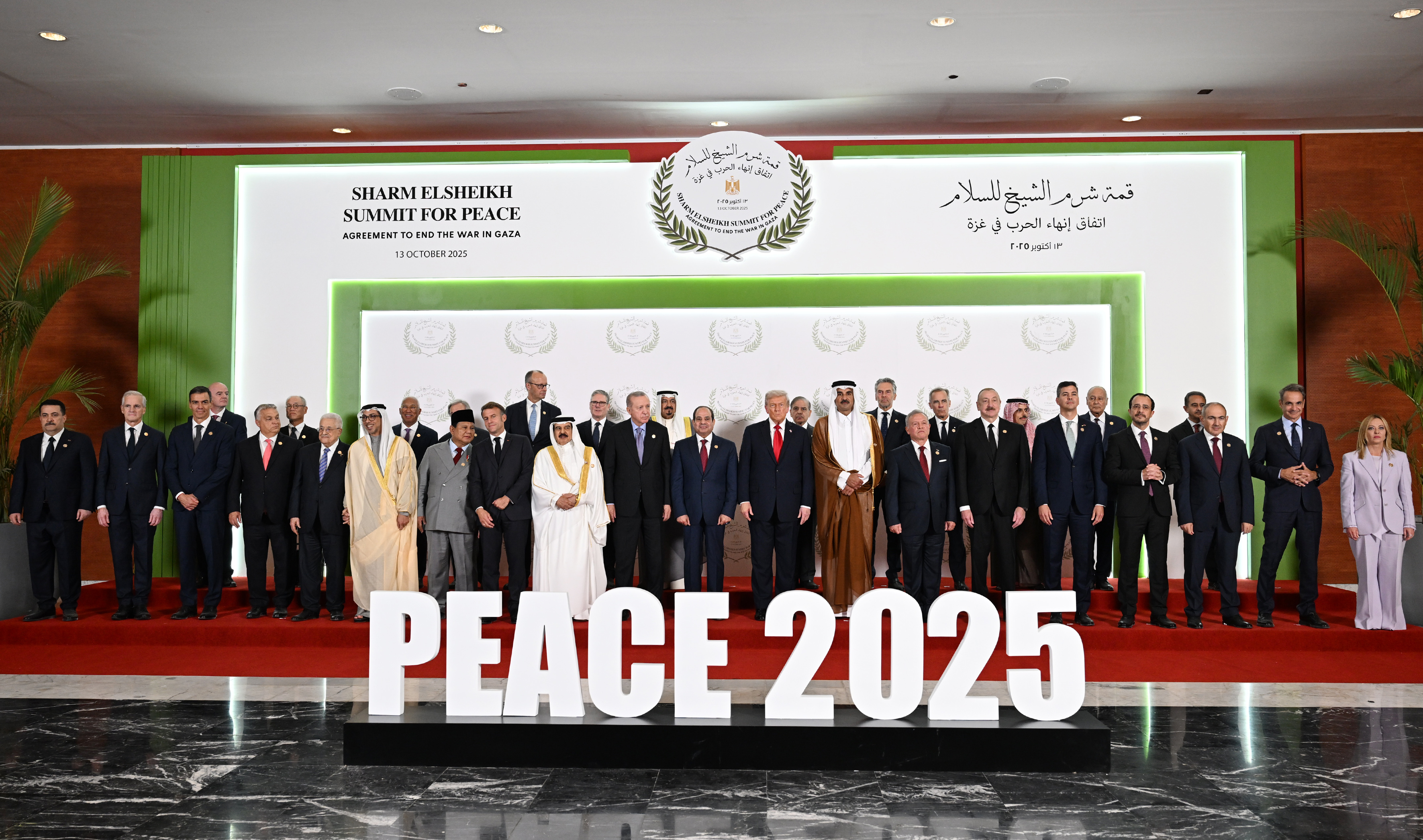
Qatari Emir Tamim bin Hamad Al Thani and Palestinian President Mahmoud Abbas at the Gaza peace summit in Egypt, 13 October 2025

Qatar, in its official stance, considers the resolution of the Palestinian issue a fundamental condition for lasting peace in the Middle East and has made the normalization of relations with Israel conditional upon this matter. According to Majed Al-Ansari, spokesman for the Qatari Foreign Ministry, this position aligns with the prevailing view in the Arab world. He also described the recent Israeli attack on the residence of Hamas members in Doha as a sign of insincerity in the negotiations and emphasized Qatar's role in mediating the release of prisoners.

== See also ==
- Foreign relations of Qatar
- Foreign relations of Palestine
- International recognition of the State of Palestine
