= Djibouti–Palestine relations =

- Djibouti: Palestine

Djibouti–Palestine relations refer to foreign relations between Djibouti and Palestine.

Ruwaid Abu Amsha is the ambassador of Palestine to Djibouti. There is a Palestinian embassy in Djibouti Ville, Djibouti. Djibouti supports ending the Israel-Palestine conflict through the implementation of the two-state solution.

== History ==
Djibouti and Palestine established ties on 13 June 1978.

Djibouti criticized president Donald Trump for recognizing Jerusalem as the capital of Israel and it said it supported East Jerusalem as the capital of a future Palestinian State.

President Ismail Omar Guelleh said in 2020 Djibouti will not establish ties with Israel until the Israel-Palestine conflict is resolved. Citizens of both countries are able to travel to both countries. Mahmoud Ali Youssouf, foreign minister of Djibouti, confirmed this again in March 2023.

Kamil Abdallah Gazaz, the ambassador of Palestine to Djibouti was given the Officer of the National Order medal by the government of Djibouti. During the Gaza war, Djibouti referred the war to the International Criminal Court. It blamed Israel for the outbreak of recent hostilities due to its treatment of Palestinians. Japan used its base in Djibouti to evacuate citizens from the war. Hamas praised Djibouti for taking a stance in favor of Palestine.

At the emergency meeting of the Arab League and the Organisation of Islamic Cooperation held in Riyadh in November 2023, Djibouti—along with Egypt, Jordan, the United Arab Emirates, Bahrain, Sudan, Morocco, Mauritania and Saudi Arabia—voted against adopting the measures to stop Israeli air traffic over the skies of the Gulf, prevent the US Air Force to deliver arms to Israel through air force bases in the Gulf region, and cut back oil sales to the US over Washington's support for Israel. Djibouti had reservations about the United States led Operation Prosperity Guardian to prevent attacks on Israel linked ships by the Houthis.

== See also ==
- Foreign relations of Djibouti
- Foreign relations of Palestine
- International recognition of Palestine
