= Palestine–South Korea relations =

- Palestine: South Korea

Palestine and South Korea do not maintain diplomatic relations.

Waleed Ali Siam is the non-resident ambassador of the State of Palestine to South Korea. While the government of the Republic of Korea does not recognize Palestine as a sovereign state, it voted in favour of a failed UNSC resolution that would have admitted Palestine as a UN member state, despite the objections of its ally, the United States.

== History ==
South Korea has a representative office in Ramallah. A survey found that 82 percent of South Koreans believe their country should not take a side in the Israel-Palestine conflict.

South Korea expressed concerns during the 2021 Israel–Palestine crisis. South Korea condemned Hamas for the Gaza war but did not fully support Israel preferring a more balanced stance. Hundreds protested against Israel's bombing in Gaza and tried to march to the Israeli embassy but were thwarted by the police.

South Korea issued a joint statement with Saudi Arabia calling for a peaceful solution to the conflict.

National Intelligence Service reported North Korea was providing support to Hamas. Akiva Tor, Israeli Ambassador to South Korea, reported North Korean weapons in Palestine, which was denied by Waleed Siam. Siam also called for a ceasefire. Ziad Hab al-Reeh, the Minister of Interior of the Palestinian National Authority, met with the head of the South Korean mission to Palestine, Geon Gyu-seok.

== See also ==
- Foreign relations of Palestine
- International recognition of Palestine
- Foreign relations of South Korea
