= Ethiopia–Palestine relations =

- Ethiopia: Palestine

Ethiopia–Palestine relations refer to foreign relations between Ethiopia and Palestine.

Palestine has an embassy in Addis Ababa, Ethiopia. The Palestinian ambassador to Ethiopia is also accredited to the African Union.

== History ==
Ethiopia did not vote in favor of the partition of British Mandate for Palestine and did not vote in favor of membership for Israel at the United Nations. Ethiopia recognized Palestine on 4 February 1989.

Zuhair Saleh Al-Shun, ambassador of Palestine to Ethiopia, presented his credentials to the United Nations Economic Commission for Africa in October 2015. Nasri Abu Jaish had served as the Ambassador of Palestine to Ethiopia.

In July 2017, President Mulatu Teshome met President Mahmoud Abbas and expressed support for a two-state solution. Palestine support Egypt in their dispute with Ethiopia over the dam on the Nile.

Nasir Abujaish, the Palestinian Ambassador to Ethiopia, asked for support in opposing the move of United States Embassy in Israel to Jerusalem. He asked African Union and Ethiopia to mediate peace negotiations between Israel and Palestine as he did not consider the United States to be a neutral party.

Prime Minister of Palestine, Mohammad Shtayyeh, visited Addis Ababa, Ethiopia to attend a summit of the African Union in 2020.

Seven Ethiopians were killed in the Gaza war while serving in the Israeli Defense Force.

== See also ==
- Foreign relations of Ethiopia
- Foreign relations of Palestine
- International recognition of Palestine
