= Libya–Palestine relations =

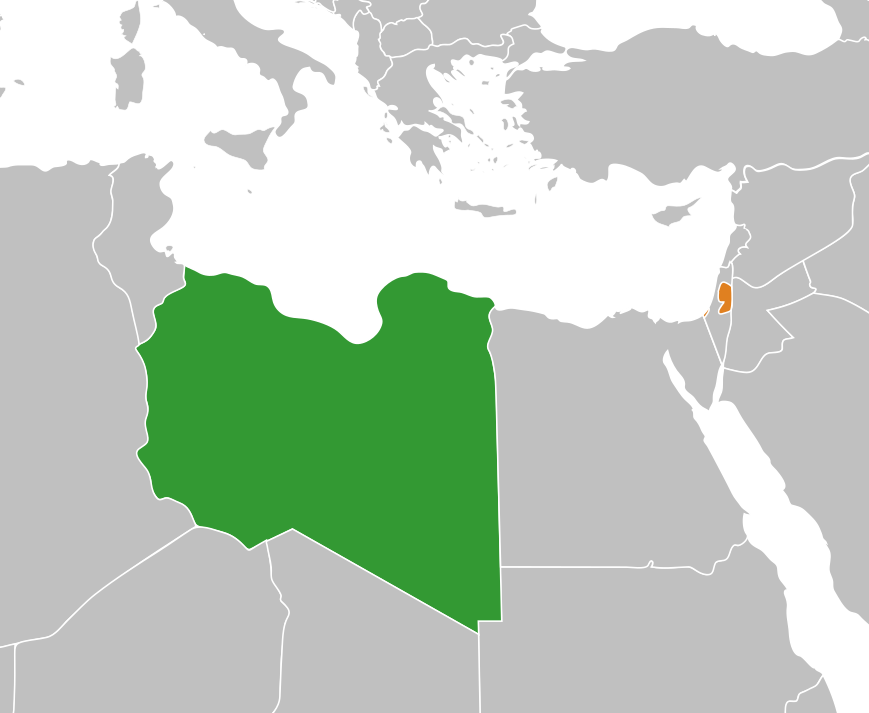

- Libya: Palestine

Libya–Palestine relations are bilateral relations between Libya and Palestine. Palestine has an embassy in Tripoli and a consulate in Benghazi. Both countries are members of the Arab League, the Organisation of Islamic Cooperation, and the Non-Aligned Movement.

== History ==
Some Libyan fighters fought in the 1948 Palestine War under the command of Egyptian and Iraqi forces. Palestine recognized the new Libyan government after the fall of Gaddafi regime on 23 August 2011.

== See also ==
- Palestinians in Libya
