= Canada–Palestine relations =

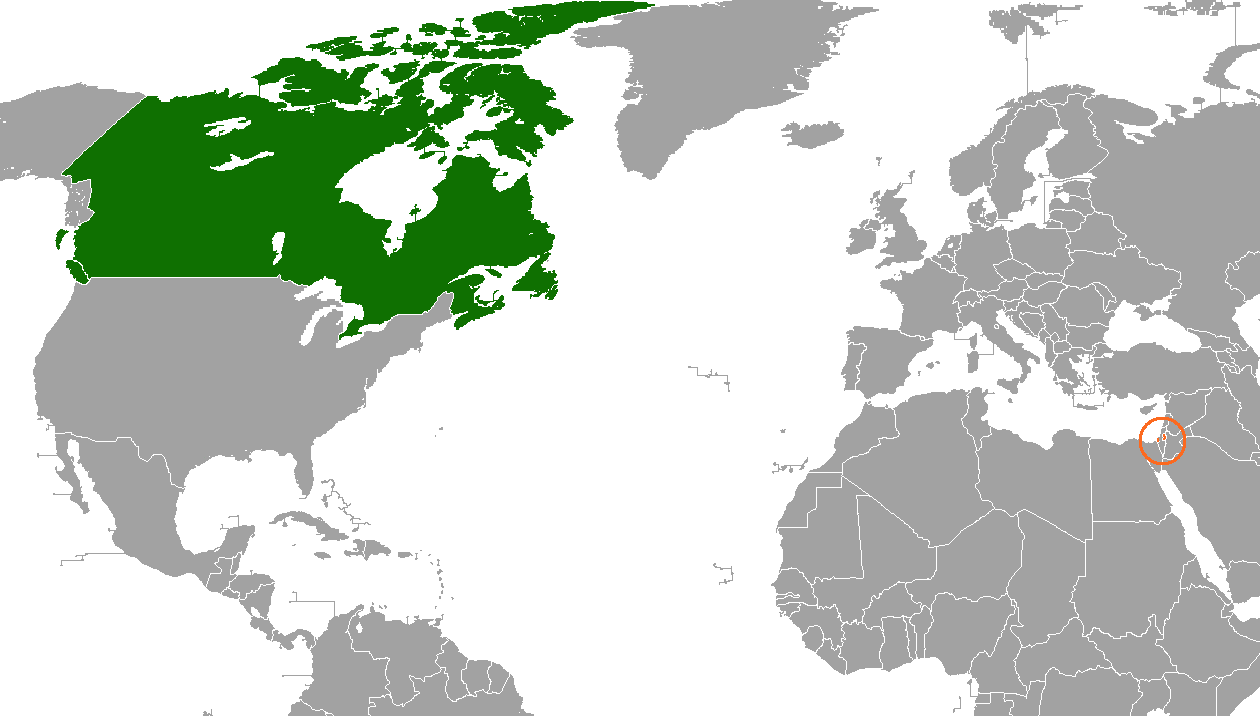

- Canada: Palestine

Canada–Palestine relations refer to the diplomatic, cultural and economic relations between Canada and the State of Palestine. Various circumstances, including Canada's colonial legacy, foreign relations, and the ongoing Israeli–Palestinian conflict, have shaped it. Canada supports a two-state solution and officially recognized a Palestinian state on 21 September 2025.

During the Ottoman Empire's rule over Palestine, which lasted until World War I, Canada did not have a significant relationship with the region. However, following the war, the British Empire gained control over Palestine, and Canada became a member of the League of Nations, which granted Britain the mandate to administer Palestine. In 1947, the United Nations General Assembly voted in favor of the partition of Palestine, leading to the creation of the state of Israel in 1948. Canada endorsed the partition plan.

In recent years, Canada has continued to maintain diplomatic relations with Israel and has been criticized by some for not taking a more active role in supporting Palestinian rights. However, Canada has also provided humanitarian aid to Palestinians and has expressed support for a two-state solution, and does not recognize West Bank settlements as part of Israel.

The Canadian government recognizes the Palestinian Authority (PA) as the representative of the Palestinian people and has maintained contact with the PA since its establishment in 1994. Canada has also provided financial assistance to the PA in support of institution-building, economic development, and humanitarian assistance.

Despite the strong support for Israel in Canada, some First Nations are sympathetic with Palestinians, due to perceived historic parallels in both peoples struggles. Conversely, other First Nations people have shown support to Israel claiming Jewish return to the land of historic Israel is actually a form of decolonization.

== Diaspora ==
There are about 30,000 Palestinians living in Canada.

== History ==
From 1948 to 1967, Canada recognized Israel shortly after its establishment, but did not formally recognize the Palestinian refugees as a distinct group or advocate for their rights. However, Canada did support the United Nations Relief and Works Agency (UNRWA), which provided assistance to Palestinian refugees.

In the aftermath of the 1967 Arab-Israeli War, Canada began to express concern about the situation of the Palestinians and the need for a peaceful resolution to the conflict. In 1969, Canada supported the UN Security Council Resolution 242, which called for Israeli withdrawal from the territories occupied in the war and the recognition of the right of all states in the region to live in peace within secure and recognized boundaries.

During the 1970s through the 1980s, saw Canada become more actively engaged in efforts to promote a peaceful resolution to the conflict.

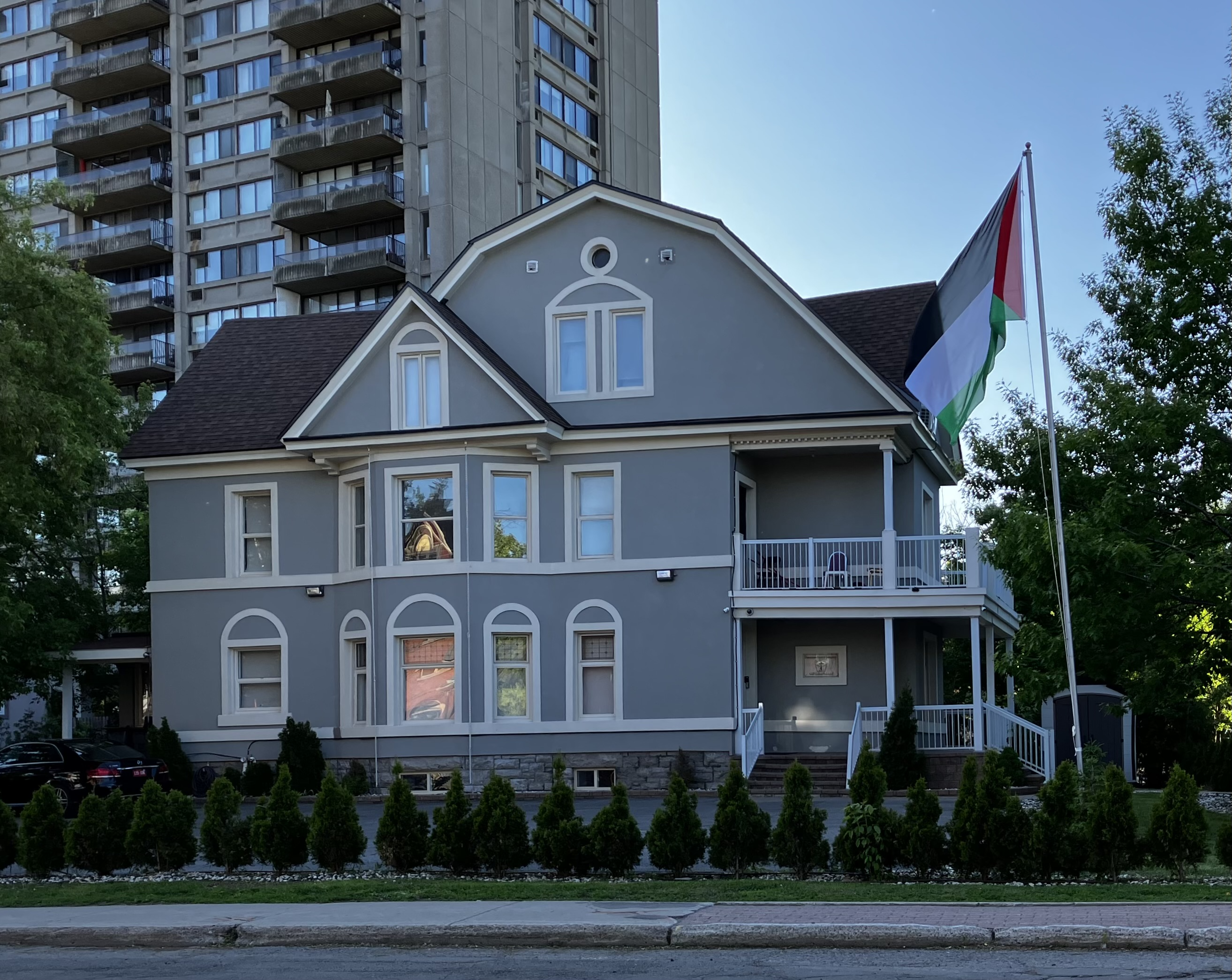
The Palestinian General Delegation in Ottawa, Canada.

Official Palestinian-Canadian ties can be traced back to the aftermath of the Oslo Accords; in 1993, a Canadian representative office was established in Ramallah. On the other side, in 1995, an office in Ottawa was established to represent Palestinian interests.

In March 2024, resolution under the government of Justin Trudeau called for Canada to "work with international partners to actively pursue the goal of a comprehensive, just and lasting peace in the Middle East, including towards the establishment of the State of Palestine as part of a negotiated two-state solution." Though the original proposal of this bill, by the New Democratic Party under Jagmeet Singh, called for the House of Commons to "officially recognize the State of Palestine," this line was removed prior to the passing of the bill.

In October 2024, the Canadian House of Commons standing committee conducted expert hearings on the issue. Shortly after, House of Commons Petition e-5244 gathered three times the required 500 signatures, which would have forced the government to respond to the matter. However, the petition was eventually withdrawn by the House of Commons due to the call of the early federal election in 2025. In June 2025, 412 Canadians, including former ambassadors, ministers, United Nations human rights experts, academics, and faith leaders urged the prime minister in an open letter to recognize Palestine. On 29 July, more than 200 former ambassadors and diplomats called the prime minister to recognize Palestine.

On 30 July 2025, Prime Minister Mark Carney announced that Canada would officially recognize Palestine during the eightieth session of the United Nations General Assembly in September 2025 if certain conditions being met such as demilitarization, Hamas not being allowed to have a role, and presidential and legislative elections scheduled for 2026.

On 21 September 2025, Canada officially recognized the state of Palestine, alongside Australia and the United Kingdom.

== See also ==
- Foreign relations of Canada
- Foreign relations of Palestine
- International recognition of Palestine
- Canada–Israel relations
