= Kenya–Palestine relations =

- Kenya: Palestine

Kenya–Palestine relations refer to foreign relations between Kenya and Palestine.

Hazem Shabat is the ambassador of Palestine to Kenya. Palestine has an embassy in Nairobi. Kenya supports a two-state solution to the Israel-Palestine conflict.

== History ==
Kenya recognized Palestinian statehood in May 1989.

In 2016, Palestine complained about President Uhuru Kenyatta visiting the Western Wall and Israeli settlements in West Bank without visiting Palestinians towns.

Kenyan police disbursed protest against Israeli attacks on Gaza in May 2021 during the 2021 Israel–Palestine crisis. Kenya urged for a de-escalation in the conflict.

On 24 May 2023, Kenya abstained from a vote on Palestinian health at the World Health Organization. Hazem Shabat, the Palestine Ambassador to Kenya, asked Israel to stop building illegal settlements in the West Bank in May 2023 at a lecture in the University of Nairobi. President William Ruto of Kenya condemned the Hamas attack on Israel on 7 October 2023 and endorsed Israel's policy. The Communist Party of Kenya organized protests in favor of Palestine which were broken up by the police. Kenyans for Palestine organized screenings of film on Palestine and called for boycott of Israeli companies. Muslim Imams also expressed support for Palestinians during the Gaza war. Three protestors were detained from a protest organized by Kenya Palestinian Solidarity Committee at the Cheche Bookshop and Cafe. Member of Parliament Farah Maalim was censured by the speaker for wearing a Palestinian keffiyeh. Eugene Wamalwa, former cabinet secretary of Kenya, has said that Kenya should not pick a side in the Israel-Palestine conflict.

== See also ==
- Foreign relations of Kenya
- Foreign relations of Palestine
- International recognition of Palestine
