= Cuba–Palestine relations =

- Cuba: Palestine

Cuba–Palestine relations refers to the bilateral relations between Cuba and Palestine. Palestine has an embassy in Havana.

== Timeline ==
In the UN General Assembly vote on the resolution to partition Mandatory Palestine, on 29 November 1947, Cuba voted against the resolution. The reason for this was "because they could not be a party to the coercion of the majority in Palestine." The Cuban delegation reported that it was pressured to vote yes.

In 1973, Fidel Castro announced at the fourth summit of the Non-Aligned countries in Algeria the severance of diplomatic relations with Israel and the recognition of the Palestine Liberation Organization (PLO). The next year, following his speech to the UN in New York, Yasser Arafat visited Cuba for the first time, where the leader of the PLO was received as a head of state, and subsequent to which a permanent PLO diplomatic office was established in Havana.

== Cuba and the Palestinian National Movement ==
During the 1970s and 1980s, Cuba expressed strong support for the unfolding Palestinian national movement, largely due to its own experiences combating colonialism. It was for this reason that Cuban leaders, specifically Fidel Castro, felt a growing sense of solidarity toward Palestine and its indigenous people. At the 1973 Non-Aligned Movement summit in Algeria, Castro cut diplomatic ties with Israel while simultaneously declaring the PLO as the legitimate voice of the Palestinian people.

OSPAAAL, the Organization of Solidarity with the Peoples of Africa, Asia, and Latin America, was a group based in Havana that used art as a way of visualizing global struggles. In the case of Palestine, they elevated its struggle against colonialism by repeatedly depicting Palestinian fighters on posters and pamphlets. These depictions typically paired Palestine with other anti-colonial struggles, such as Vietnam and Angola, emphasizing a shared narrative of resistance against imperialism. OSPAAAL's messaging reflected Cuba's broader ideology that this resistance was not isolated but part of a transcendent movement occurring throughout the Global South.

This support interconnects to Cuba's broader commitment to Third Worldism, a Cold War ideological movement spearheaded by countries newly independent within Africa, Asia, and Latin America. Its focus revolved around anti-imperialist struggles and the rejection of both Western and Soviet influence. Cuba's support for Palestine fit into the broader strategy of South–South cooperation, referring to the collaboration of countries in the Global South unifying in their desire to remain independent of global superpowers. Through Cuba's allegiance to, and positioning of, Palestine within a broader framework of liberation struggles, Cuba helped to advance Palestine's image as a key symbol of anti-colonial resistance.
