= Ecuador–Palestine relations =

- Ecuador: Palestine

Ecuador–Palestine relations refer to foreign relations between Ecuador and Palestine.

Ecuador supports a two-state solution to the Israel-Palestine conflict. Neville Montenegro is the ambassador of Ecuador to Palestine.

== History ==
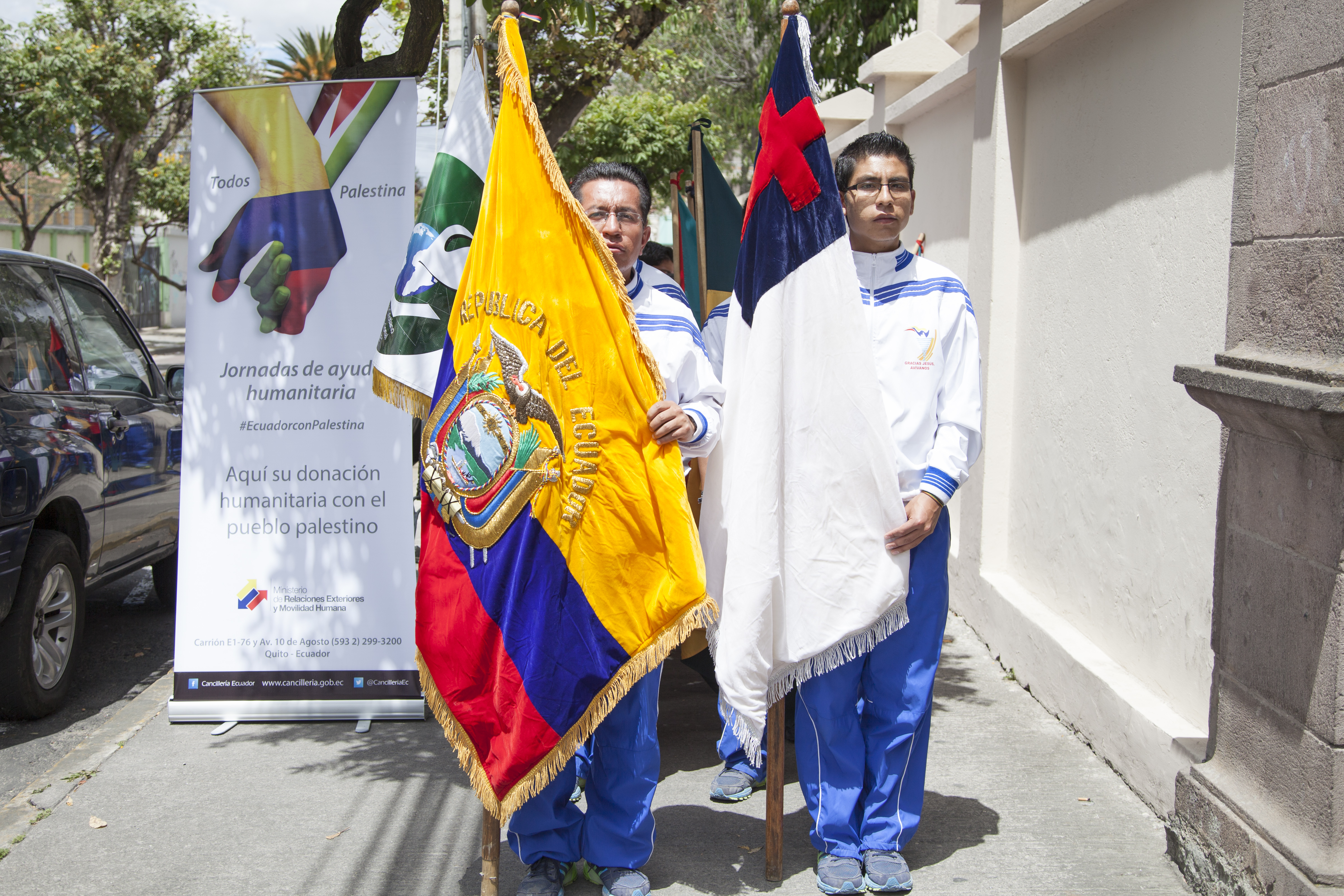
Ecuadorian Christians campaigning for humanitarian aid to Palestine in 2014.

Ecuador had voted for the 1947 partition of the Mandate of Palestine.

In 1980, after Israel declared Jerusalem its capital Ecuador relocated its embassy from Jerusalem to Tel Aviv.

Ecuador condemned the 2014 Gaza War and recalled its ambassador from Israel. President Rafael Correa cancelled a trip to Israel due to the war. It also announced plans to open an embassy in Ramallah.

In December 2015, President Rafael Correa of Ecuador officially recognized Palestine. It was the fifth country in Latin America to establish diplomatic ties with Palestine. It supports the creation of an independent state of Palestine along the 1967 borders.

Byron Vinicio Suquilanda Valdivieso, Ambassador of Ecuador to the State of Palestine, met the Prime Minister of Palestine Mohammad Shtayyeh on 3 March 2022. Veronica Abad, vice-president of Ecuador, announced in November 2023 that she would visit Israel to negotiate peace between Israel and Hamas on the instructions of President Daniel Noboa. Ecuador had expressed solidarity with Israel after Hamas's attack.

Ecuador recognized Palestine as a State with the frontier lines of 1967, on December 24, 2010.
