= Walid Abu Ali =

Palestinian diplomat

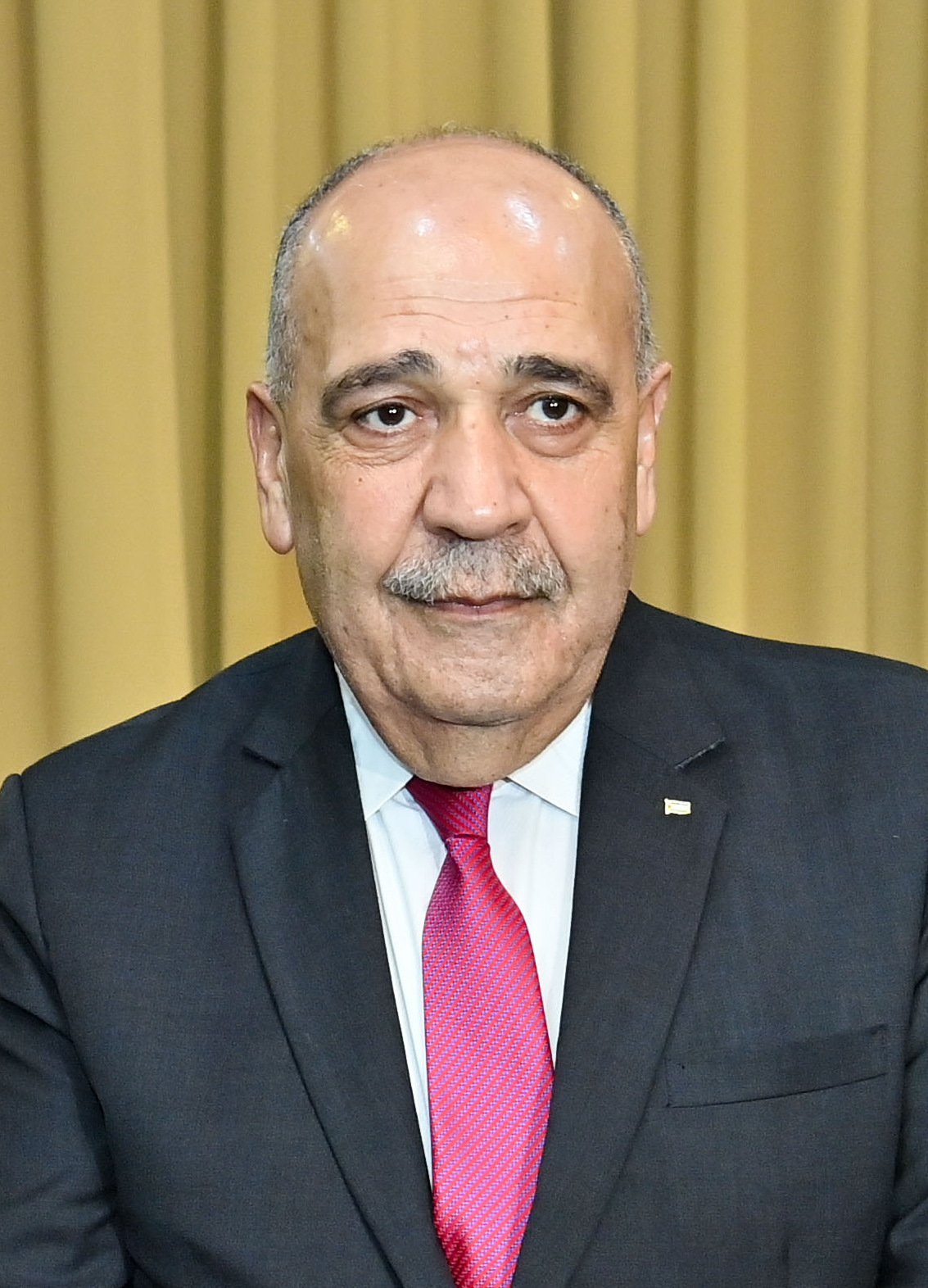

Ambassador of Palestine to Malaysia
- Incumbent
- Assumed office 2018

Ambassador of Palestine to Maldives
- Incumbent
- Assumed office 2019

Ambassador of Palestine to Brunei
- Incumbent
- Assumed office 2019

Ambassador of Palestine to Pakistan
- In office 2012–2018

Personal details
- Born: June 26, 1957 (age 69) Al-Walaja

Walid Abu Ali (Arabic: وليد أبو علي) is the present ambassador of Palestine to Malaysia since 2018 and is a non-resident ambassador of Palestine in the Maldives. From 2012 to 2018, he was ambassador of Palestine to Pakistan.

On 30 December 2017 he was recalled by the Palestinian Government after sharing a dais with Hafiz Saeed who is wanted by India in connection with the Mumbai Attacks.
