= Palestine–Tanzania relations =

- Palestine: Tanzania

Palestine–Tanzania relations are the bilateral relations between Palestine and Tanzania. Tanzania and its ruling party are staunch supporters of the establishment of a Palestinian state. A close connection was developed between Yasser Arafat and Julius Nyerere, the president of Tanzania. One of the earliest in Africa, the embassy of Palestine in Tanzania was opened in 1973. During the Uganda–Tanzania War, Palestinian fighters supported the Ugandan side.

== Sports relations ==
Tanzania hosted the Palestinian national team in February 2011 for a friendly game that took place in Dar es Salaam and finished with a 1–0 victory for Tanzania.
