= Palestine–United Arab Emirates relations =

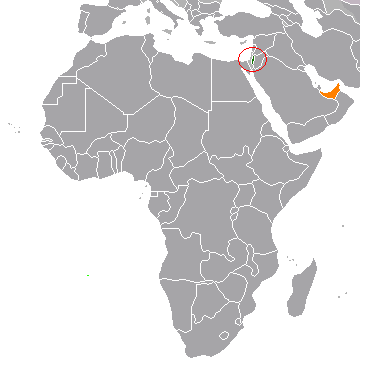

- Palestine: United Arab Emirates

Palestine–United Arab Emirates relations (Arabic: العلاقات بين الأراضي الفلسطينية والإمارات العربية المتحدة) are the economic and political relations between the United Arab Emirates and Palestine. The United Arab Emirates (UAE) has a Liaison Office in Ramallah while Palestine maintains an embassy in Abu Dhabi. Both the UAE and Palestine form part of the Middle East region and share strong cultural ties. Like other Muslim countries, the UAE supported the independence of Palestinian people. Many Palestinians travel, work, and reside in the UAE. Relations deteriorated in 2020 when the United Arab Emirates entered into a normalization process with Israel through the Abraham Accords. Palestinians perceived it as a betrayal of the Palestinian cause because they were no longer recognized as the sole legitimate government in the historic Palestinian territories.

On 15 May 2022, Palestinian President Mahmoud Abbas visited the United Arab Emirates to offer condolences on the death of Emirati President, Khalifa bin Zayed, and to congratulate the new president, Mohammed bin Zayed. This was the first day-long visit since 2011.

== Geography ==
Palestine and the UAE both lie in the Middle East. Palestine lies in the western part of the Middle East, shares the eastern coast of the Mediterranean Sea with Egypt and Israel, and is bordered by Egypt to the south, Jordan to the east, and Israel. Whereas the UAE lies in the southeastern part of the peninsula and shares borders with Oman and Saudi Arabia. The Gulf of Oman and the Persian Gulf also surround the UAE.

Both have most of the trade through maritime trade and import resources.

== Relapse in relationships ==
Since 2018, the United Arab Emirates has improved its relations with Israel, culminating in the Abraham Accords between the UAE and Israel in September 2020. Ramallah recalled its ambassadors from the UAE over the deal with Israel. On 30 October 2020, it was reported that long-time rival of Palestinian President Mahmoud Abbas, and ex-Fatah chief in the Gaza Strip Mohammed Dahlan aided efforts to normalize ties between Arab countries and Israel, angering Abbas. In light of normalization efforts with Israel, Palestine has rejected aid from the UAE multiple times.

On 5 February 2021, it was reported that UAE funding for the United Nations Relief and Works Agency for Palestine Refugees in the Near East (UNRWA) was slashed by 98% in 2020, amidst normalization of ties with Israel.

== See also ==
- Foreign relations of the State of Palestine
- Foreign relations of the United Arab Emirates
- Israel–United Arab Emirates relations
- Foreign relations of Israel
