= Palestine–Somalia relations =

- Palestine: Somalia

Palestine–Somalia relations refer to foreign relations between Somalia and Palestine. Somalia was the second country to recognise the Palestinian declaration of independence after Algeria on the same day, 15 November 1988.

== History ==
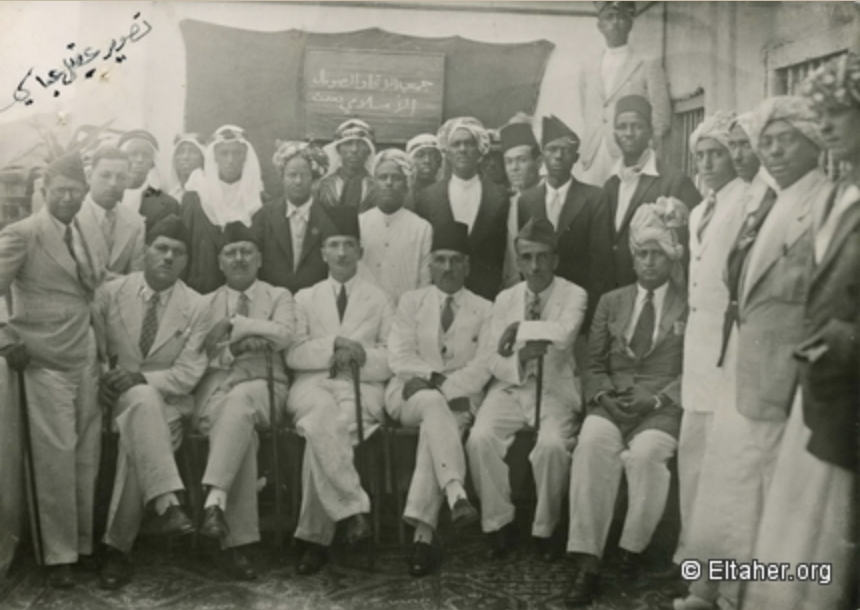
The Somali Islamic Union reception for the Palestinian leaders returning from exile in the Seychelles in 1939.

Somalia under the administration of Siad Barre had close and fraternal relations with the Palestine Liberation Organization and its Chairman Yasser Arafat. Both the PLO and Somalia supported materially and diplomatically the liberation and self-determination movements of Africa and Asia such as ZANU and the African National Congress. This would also cause friction with Israel as Israel would usually support the opposing force, e.g. the Rhodesian & South African apartheid regimes.

Somalia has opposed the existence and legitimacy of the State of Israel since Somalia's independence in 1960 and has supported the Palestinian cause unabated since. This has led Israel to develop a strategic relationship with Ethiopia (both Imperial and Marxist) and later Somaliland.

In 1977, militants from the Popular Front for the Liberation of Palestine hijacked Lufthansa Flight 181. The Somali Army counter-terrorist forces alongside GSG-9 and SAS conducted Operation Feuerzauber and rescued all 86 hostages.

Shortly after the outbreak of the Gaza War the Prime Minister of Somalia, Hamza Abdi Barre, declared in November 2023 that the Palestinian organization Hamas was a liberation organization and publicly expressed support for the group. He declared at a ceremony held at the National Theatre in Mogadishu, "...they want to convince us to label Hamas as a terrorist organization. We don't say it, and we don't accept it," and that "We will not compromise until we see a Palestinian government with Jerusalem as its capital. The blood of the people of Gaza is the beginning of the liberation of Al-Aqsa."

Somalia does not maintain an embassy in Palestine and Palestine maintains a non-resident embassy in Djibouti City. Palestine also sends development aid to Somalia via the Palestinian International Cooperation Agency (PICA).

== See also ==
- Foreign relations of Palestine
- Foreign relations of Somalia
