= Belarus–Palestine relations =

- Belarus: Palestine

Belarus–Palestine relations are the bilateral relations between Belarus and State of Palestine. The Byelorussian Soviet Socialist Republic recognized Palestinian statehood on 19 November 1988. The State of Palestine has an embassy in Minsk, which opened in 2003.

== History ==
Belarus' Deputy Foreign Minister Andrei Dapkiunas reaffirmed in 2017 that the country's position on Jerusalem had not changed. "A fair and long-term solution to the Palestine-Israel conflict through diplomacy and politics based on international law, including UN resolutions, is the view of Belarus".

On 2 September 2022, Palestinian Ambassador Ahmed Mohammed al-Madbuh presented his credentials to Belarusian Foreign Minister Vladimir Makei and they held talks during which they stressed taking practical steps to strengthen cooperation between the two countries.
