= Palestinians in Libya =

الفلسطينيون في ليبيا

Total population
- 45,000 to 70,000 (2012)

Regions with significant populations
- Tripoli, Benghazi, Sirte, and Misrata

Languages
- Arabic

The Palestinian population in Libya is concentrated primarily in major cities, including Tripoli, Benghazi, Sirte, and Misrata. Groups of Palestinians began arriving in Libya following its independence in the 1950s, working primarily in the education and construction sectors, as well as in government departments. Another group arrived in the early 1970s as oil production increased. At certain periods, the number of Palestinians reached nearly 100,000. In 1995, the Gaddafi regime expelled 30,000 Palestinians, using the Oslo Accords, which it strongly opposed, and Yasser Arafat's unilateral action as justification to prove that it was an agreement that would not solve the root of the problem.

== Notable people ==
- Mohammed Assaf
- Mahmud Suleiman Maghribi
- Tarek Ben Halim
- Shadi Alzaqzouq
