= Palestine–Sudan relations =

- Palestine: Sudan

Palestine–Sudan relations are the political and economic relations between Palestine and Sudan. Palestine has an embassy in Khartoum, but Sudan does not have a representative office or embassy in Palestine. The two countries form part of the Middle East region and share strong and similar cultural ties together. Sudan supports the independence of Palestine. Many Palestinians reside in Sudan to study or to work.

== Historical relations ==
Between 29 August and 1 September 1967, the Fourth Arab Summit (Arab League summit 1967) was held in the Capital of Sudan, Khartoum, which was known as the Summit of the Three No's.

Relations between with Palestine Liberation Organization and Sudan began in 1969. After the declaration of the independence of Palestine and the establishment of the State of Palestine on 15 November 1988, Sudan raised the diplomatic representation of an embassy with all immunities and privileges.

== Political relations ==
On 21 January 2017, the Joint Ministerial Higher Committee between the governments of Palestine and Sudan signed 18 memoranda of understanding in the areas of commercial, security, international, health, justice, judicial, tourism, banking, documentation, culture, planning, information, counseling and endowments, and visas. Travel, care and social security.

Both Hamas and Palestinian Islamic Jihad criticized Sudan for agreeing to establish relations with Israel.

On November 10, 2023, Sudan's general Abdel Fattah Al Burhan condemned Israel's action in Gaza, calling it "aggression". He also claimed that Palestine should have the right to establish a state with the 1967 borders.

In March 2025, a report emerged that the United States and Israel discussed forcibly relocating Palestinians from Gaza to Sudan, Somalia, and the breakaway region of Somaliland. These discussions followed a proposal from US President Donald Trump in 2024 about displacing Palestinians, which sparked widespread condemnation, including claims of ethnic cleansing. While Sudan rejected the proposal, officials from Somalia and Somaliland denied any involvement.

== See also ==
- Foreign relations of Palestine
- Foreign relations of Sudan
- Embassy of Palestine, Khartoum
