= Bosnia and Herzegovina–Palestine relations =

- Bosnia and Herzegovina: Palestine

The Bosnia and Herzegovina–Palestine relations are the bilateral relations between Bosnia and Herzegovina and Palestine. The countries recognized each other on 27 May 1992. Palestine has an embassy in Sarajevo. Bosnia does not have diplomatic representation in Palestine, but its embassy in Cairo is accredited to the Palestinian side. In the past, both countries were part of the Ottoman Empire.

== History ==
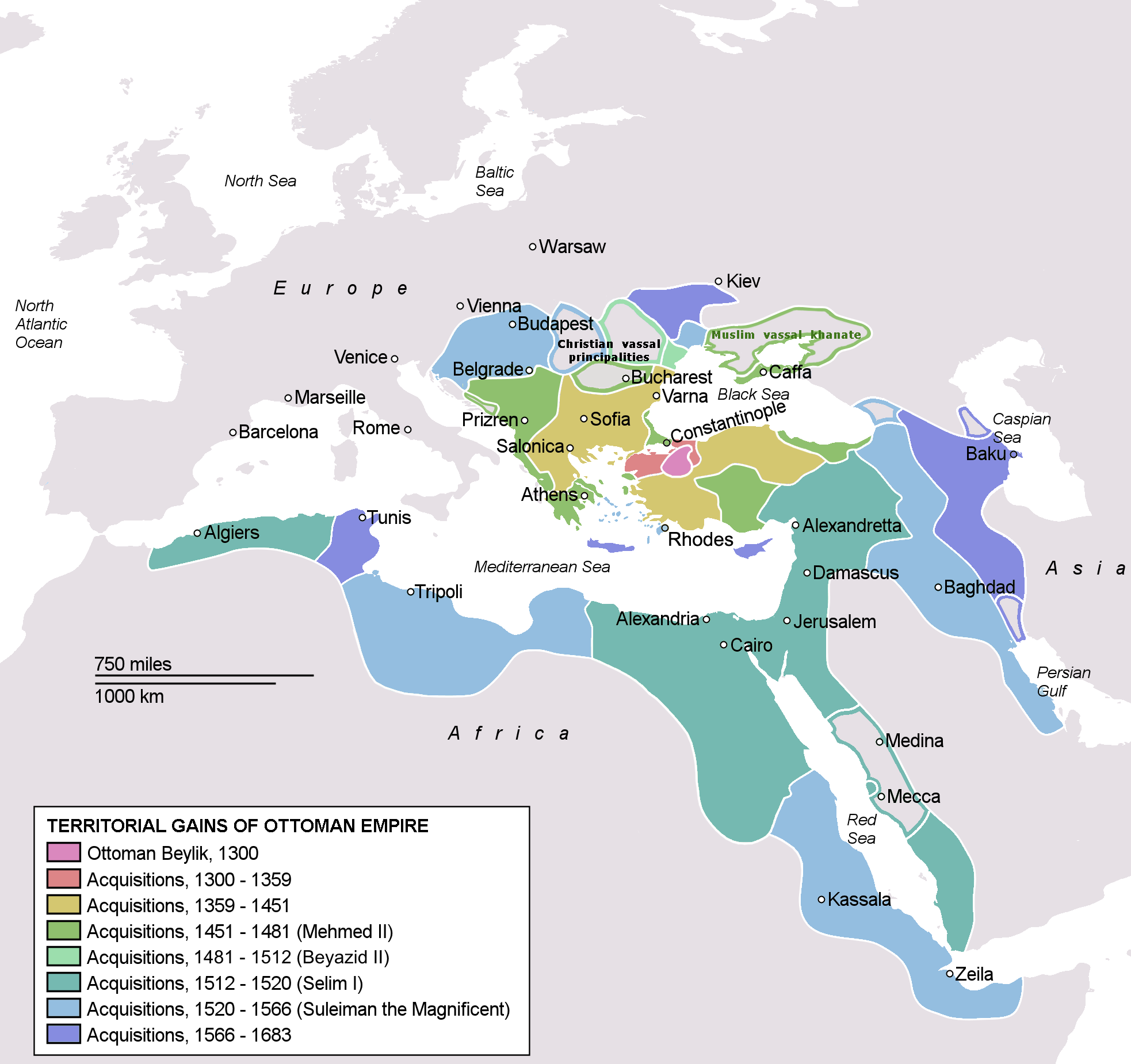
After Ottoman conquest of Bosnia and Herzegovina and later Ottoman–Mamluk War, both Bosnia and Herzegovina and Palestine were part of the Ottoman Empire.

During the 1948 Palestine war, Bosnian volunteers, joined by Albanian and Croatian cohorts, fought against the Zionist forces that later formed the IDF. In January 1948, it was reported that Arab agents were recruiting Bosnians to fight in Palestine, which was embroiled in a civil war after the resolution calling for the partition of the country. The motivation behind the recruitment was the Arab paramilitary units in Palestine, the modern regular Syrian army which needed expertise, and the Arab Salvation Army. Originating from displaced persons camps in Italy, the volunteers were gathered and sent by way of Egypt, Beirut, and Syria. Estimates indicate the arrival of 500 to 1,000 volunteers from Bosnia and Herzegovina who formed a unit within the Arab Salvation Army; many of them were Muslims, including veterans of World War II. Some of these individuals settled in Palestine after the war. Earlier, in the early 1880s, a group of Herzegovinian families had established the village of Qisarya south of Haifa. They integrated into Palestinian society and ultimately shared the same fate during the events of 1948 and the subsequent decades.

In 1999, following reports of Bosnia and Herzegovina's intention to open its embassy in Israel in Jerusalem, the Presidency of Bosnia and Herzegovina categorically denied this and confirmed that its embassy would be in Tel Aviv. The presidency also stressed that the establishment of diplomatic relations with Israel would not be against the Arab–Israeli peace process and would promote efforts to achieve a peaceful settlement in the Middle East.

On 27 October 2023, Bosnia and Herzegovina was one of 121 countries to vote in favor of a General Assembly resolution calling for an immediate ceasefire to Gaza war.
