= Kazakhstan–Palestine relations =

- Kazakhstan: Palestine

Kazakhstan–Palestine relations are the bilateral relations between Kazakhstan and Palestine. Diplomatic relations were established on 6 April 1992. Both countries are members of the Organisation of Islamic Cooperation. Palestine has an embassy in the capital Astana, while Kazakhstan is represented in Palestine by its embassy in Amman, Jordan.

== History ==
PLO chairman Yasser Arafat first visited Kazakhstan in December 1991.
