= Palestine–Sahrawi Arab Democratic Republic relations =

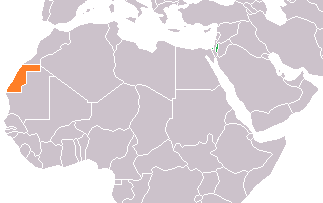

- Palestine: Sahrawi Arab Democratic Republic

Official relations between the two countries of Palestine and the Sahrawi Arab Democratic Republic (Western Sahara) do not exist. Despite this, there are informal connections.

== History and modern relations ==
Both nations have an Arab majority. The future founder of Polisario Front, El-Ouali Mustapha Sayed, used to meet Palestinian leaders during 1970s in Lebanon, Fearing a future Moroccan occupation of Western Sahara, the Polisario Front was established, in a similar format to the PFLP. The flag of Western Sahara draws from the flag of Palestine. The influence of the Sahrawi independence movement draws a level of sympathy toward Sahrawis among Palestinians.

George Habash, one of the founders of Palestine's PLO, met with Brahim Ghali in 1979 and indicated solidarity with the Western Saharan cause. Both countries share similar styles of struggling, including conducting guerrilla warfare, against both Israel and Morocco.

In 2016, the Palestinian Solidarity Committee with Western Sahara was banned from entering Gaza by Hamas.

=== 2023 Israel–Hamas war ===
On 10 October 2023, the Polisario Front expressed support for the Palestinian people. On 15 October, Sahrawi Ambassador to Algeria, Abdelkader Taleb Omar, met with the PFLP political representative to Algeria, Nader Qaisi, at the Sahrawi Embassy in Algiers. SADR was among the countries that condemned Al-Ahli Arab Hospital explosion.
