= Palestine–European Union relations =

European Union–Palestine relations
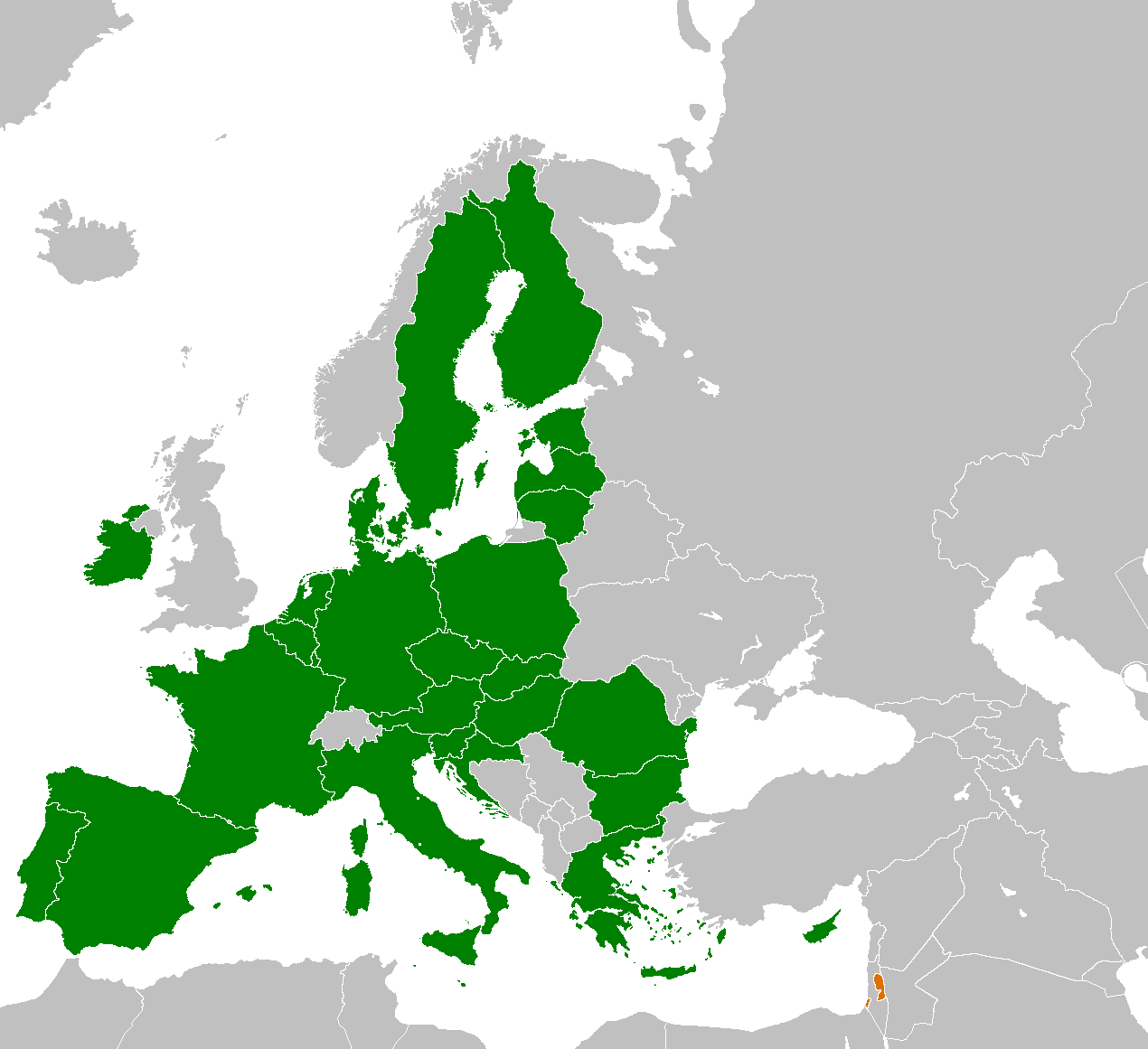

- European Union: Palestine

Relations between the European Union (EU) and the Palestine Liberation Organisation (PLO) were established in 1975 as part of the Euro-Arab Dialogue. The EU is a member of the Quartet and is the single largest donor of foreign aid to the Palestinian Authority.

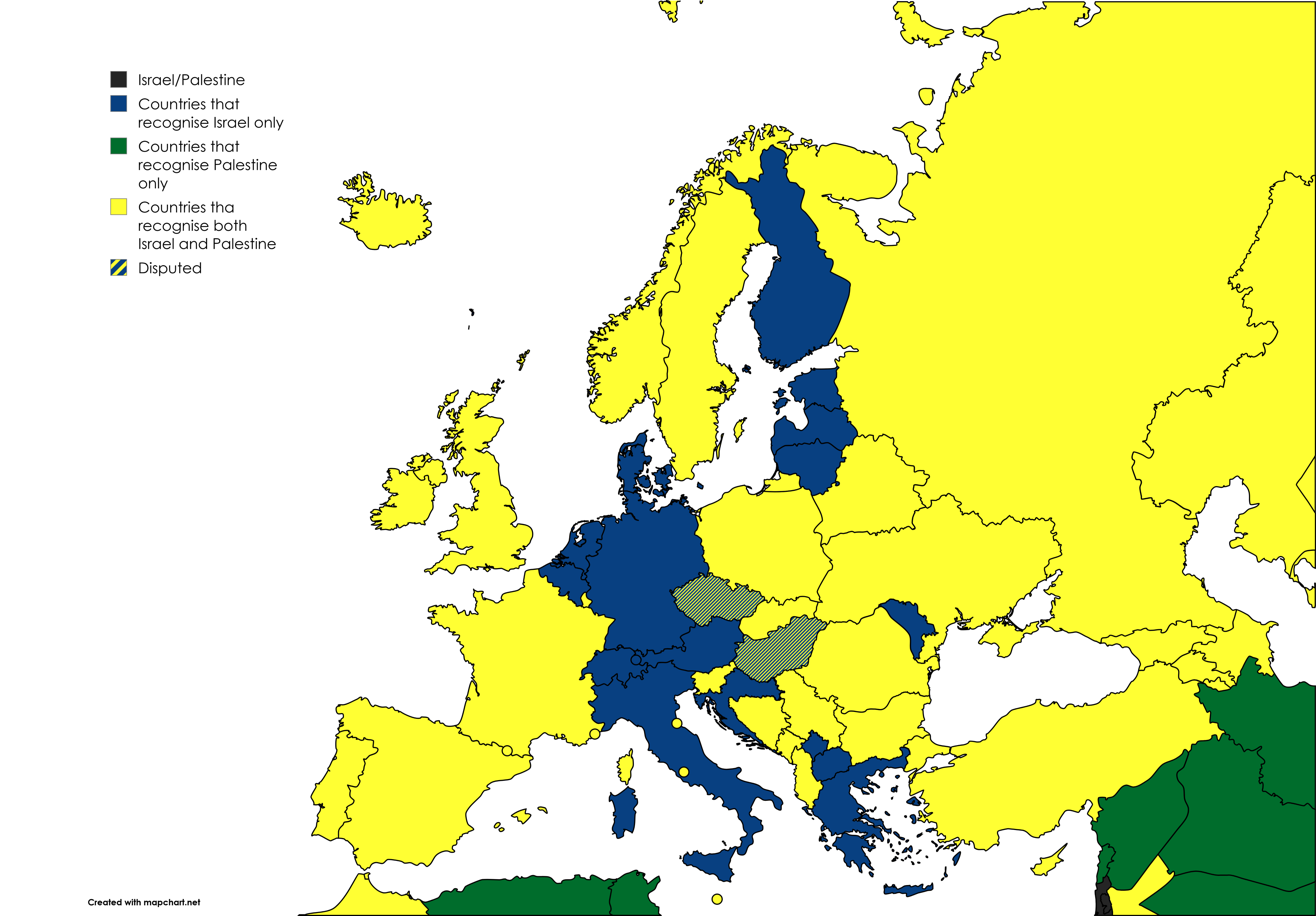
International recognition of Israel and Palestine in Europe. Recognition of Israel and Palestine Recognition of Israel only Recognition of Palestine only Israel/Palestine

Fifteen out of twenty-seven EU member states recognise the State of Palestine, or 55% of EU member states. In 2014, Sweden became the first country to recognise Palestine while being an EU member state. Cyprus had recognised Palestine prior to joining the EU, as did a number of Central European member states when they were allied with the Soviet Union in the Eastern Bloc. However, some of these states, particularly the Czech Republic and Hungary, have emerged as Israel's closest allies in Europe. On 28 May 2024, Norway, Ireland and Spain recognised the State of Palestine, the latter two being EU member states. On 4 June 2024, Slovenia recognised Palestine in an overwhelming vote, reflecting a common historical aspiration. On 21 September 2025, Portugal recognised Palestine through an announcement by Foreign Minister Paulo Rangel. France, Luxembourg and Malta recognised the State of Palestine during the eightieth session of the United Nations General Assembly on 22 September 2025, while Belgium has announced that they will recognize provided certain conditions are met.

== Representation ==
The EU maintains a representative office in Ramallah, accredited to the PNA. The PLO's general delegation in Brussels, accredited to the EU, was first established as an information and liaison bureau in September 1976. Other representations are maintained in almost every European capital, many of which have been accorded full diplomatic status. The EU's special envoy to the Middle East Peace Process is Sven Koopmans.

In Western Europe, Spain was the first country granting diplomatic status to a PLO representative, followed later by Portugal, Austria, France, Italy and Greece.

== Position on Israeli issues ==
The EU has insisted that it will not recognise any changes to the 1967 borders other than those agreed between the parties. Israel's settlement program has therefore led to some tensions, and EU states consider these settlements illegal under international law.

In 2008, during the French presidency of the Council, the European Union strived to increase cooperation with the US on Middle-Eastern issues, inter alia with a view to coordinating common pressures on Israel.

The EU has also been highly critical of Israeli military actions in the Palestinian territories and Lebanon, often referring to them as "disproportionate" and "excessive force" and calling for an immediate cease-fire. During Operation Defensive Shield in 2002, the European Parliament passed a non-binding resolution calling for economic sanctions on Israel and an arms embargo on both parties. Following the Gaza War of 2008-2009, the European Parliament endorsed the Goldstone Report. The EU has also been critical of Israel's Gaza blockade, referring to it as "collective punishment".

== Position on recognition ==
Votes on membership (UNESCO) and status (UNGA) of Palestine
Country	UNESCO Vote	UNGA Vote
Austria	Yes	Yes
Belgium	Yes	Yes
Bulgaria	Abstain	Abstain
Croatia	Abstain	Abstain
Cyprus	Yes	Yes
Czech Republic	No	No
Denmark	Abstain	Yes
Estonia	Abstain	Abstain
Finland	Yes	Yes
France	Yes	Yes
Germany	No	Abstain
Greece	Yes	Yes
Hungary	Abstain	Abstain
Ireland	Yes	Yes
Italy	Abstain	Yes
Latvia	Abstain	Abstain
Lithuania	No	Abstain
Luxembourg	Yes	Yes
Malta	Yes	Yes
Netherlands	No	Abstain
Poland	Abstain	Abstain
Portugal	Abstain	Yes
Romania	Abstain	Abstain
Slovakia	Abstain	Abstain
Slovenia	Yes	Abstain
Spain	Yes	Yes
Sweden	No	Yes

The EU first endorsed the idea of Palestinian statehood in its 1999 Berlin Declaration. Before that, the EU and its predecessor, the EC, had since 1973 through various declarations legitimised Palestinian rights in the form of recognising the Palestinians as "a people", the need for them to have a "homeland" and the freedom to exercise their "right to self-determination".

In July 2009, EU foreign policy chief Javier Solana called for the United Nations to recognise the Palestinian state by a set deadline even if a settlement had not been reached: "The mediator has to set the timetable. If the parties are not able to stick to it, then a solution backed by the international community should ... be put on the table. After a fixed deadline, a UN Security Council resolution ... would accept the Palestinian state as a full member of the UN, and set a calendar for implementation."

In December 2009, the Council of the European Union endorsed a set of conclusions on the Israeli–Palestinian conflict which forms the basis of EU policy in that year. It reasserted the objective of a two-state solution, and stressed that the union "will not recognise any changes to the pre-1967 borders including with regard to Jerusalem, other than those agreed by the parties." It recalled that the EU "has never recognised the annexation of East Jerusalem" and that the State of Palestine must have its capital in Jerusalem.

A year later, in December 2010, the Council reiterated these conclusions and announced its readiness, when appropriate, to recognise a Palestinian state, but encouraged a return to negotiations. Eight of its 27 member states have recognised the State of Palestine.

In 2011, the Palestinian government called on the EU to recognise the State of Palestine in a United Nations resolution scheduled for 20 September. Mahmoud Abbas reiterated such calls in Brussels again in early 2018. EU member states grew divided over the issue. Some, including Spain, France and the United Kingdom, stated that they might recognise if talks did not progress, while others, including Germany and Italy, refused. Catherine Ashton said that the EU position would depend on the wording of the proposal. At the end of August, Israel's defence minister Ehud Barak told Ashton that Israel was seeking to influence the wording: "It is very important that all the players come up with a text that will emphasise the quick return to negotiations, without an effort to impose pre-conditions on the sides."

EU member states were divided in their vote on United Nations General Assembly resolution 67/19 in 2012, which recognised Palestine as a non-member observer state at the UN General Assembly. 14 member states voted for, 13 abstained and the Czech Republic voted against.

In 2014, the European Union and the United States officially criticised Israel's settlement policies in East Jerusalem, which the Palestinians regard as their de jure capital, and warned against the further construction of Israeli homes on disputed land.

In December 2014, the European Parliament voted in favour of a non-binding resolution calling for the recognition of Palestinian statehood as part of a two-state solution and alongside the development of the peace process with 498 votes in favour, 88 against and 111 abstentions. In recent years, many European parliaments including France, Portugal, Spain, Italy, Greece, Luxembourg, Ireland and the United Kingdom have passed motions calling on their governments to recognise Palestine.

On 9 December 2019, new EU foreign policy chief Josep Borrell said ministers "will deeply discuss the situation in the Middle East" when they meet again in Brussels on 20 January 2020. Ireland and Luxembourg are among a small group of countries that want the issue put on the agenda; in a letter to Borrell, Luxembourg Foreign Minister Jean Asselborn said that hopes for a two-state solution are "being dismantled piece by piece, day after day," and that it is time to consider recognising Palestine as a state.

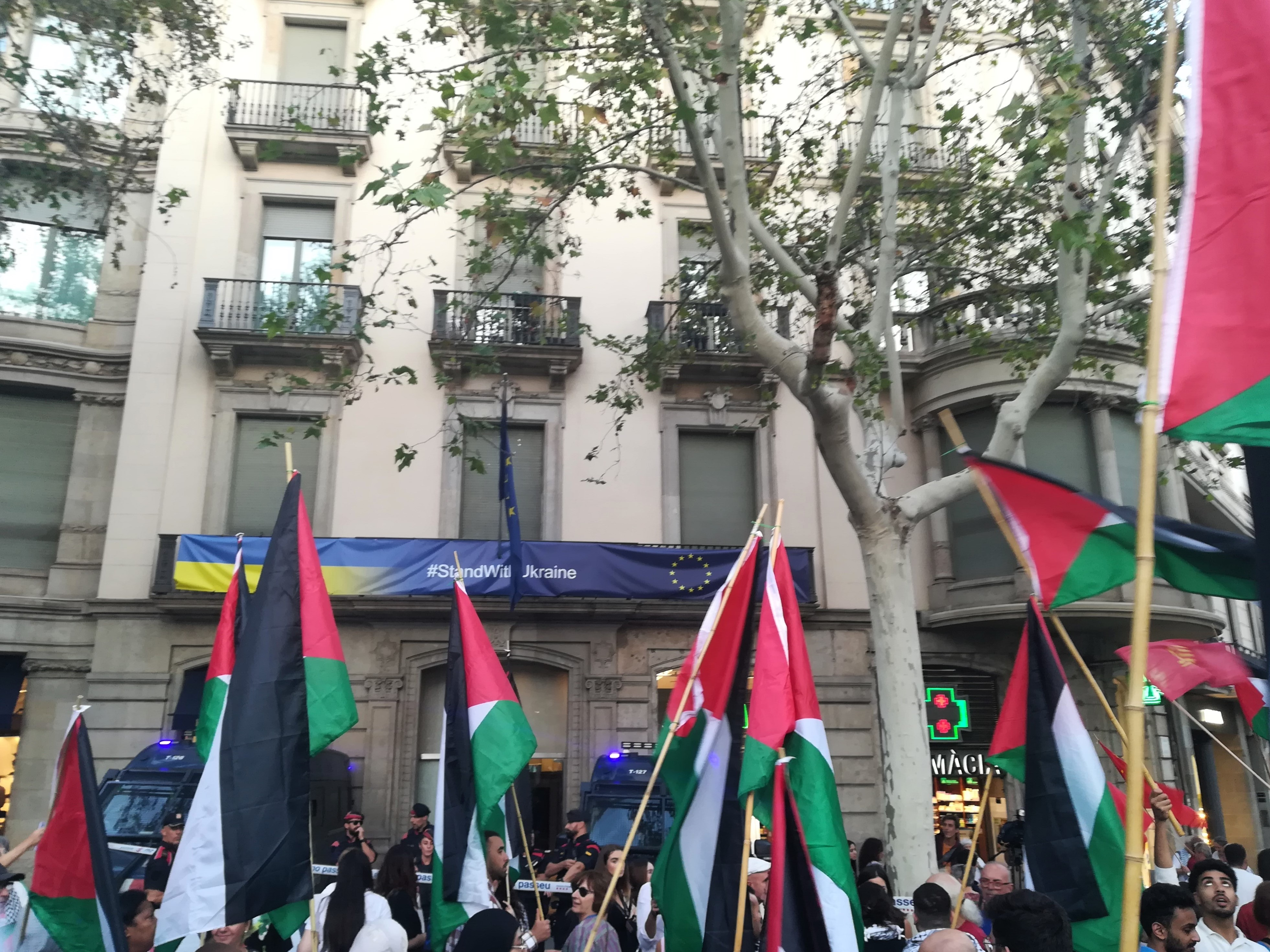
Pro-Palestine protest in front of the European Commission's regional office in Barcelona, 11 October 2023

In October 2023, EU foreign policy chief Josep Borrell condemned the "barbaric and terrorist attack" by the Palestinian militant group Hamas on Israel during the Gaza war. He accused Israel of breaking international law by imposing a total blockade of the Gaza Strip. The President of the European Commission, Ursula von der Leyen, condemned the indiscriminate attacks by Hamas on Israel, calling it "terrorism in its most despicable form" and saying "Israel has the right to defend itself against such heinous attacks". Spain’s Minister of social rights Ione Belarra accused EU of "being complicit in Israel's war crimes".

== Financial support from the EU ==
The Palestinian news agency Maan reported in 2011, citing a senior official at the Palestinian Ministry of Planning, that the PA has received about US$20 billion in donor funds since the peace process began. It is estimated that the EU, including individual contributions by its members, has given €10 billion to the Palestinians since the peace process began in 1994. Economic assistance to the PA and the Palestinian people constitutes the EU’s highest per capita foreign aid program. The current framework for EU engagement with Palestine is the "2017-2020 – Towards a democratic and accountable Palestinian State" which includes annual meetings to assess progress. In October 2023, Ursula von der Leyen announced that EU humanitarian aid to Gaza would be tripled. In July 2024, the European Commission announced loans and grants of €400 million to the Palestinian Authority as a measure to prevent its financial collapse.

== Palestine's bilateral relations with EU member states ==
- Austria
- Belgium
- Bulgaria
- Croatia
- Cyprus
- Czech Republic
- Denmark
- Estonia
- Finland
- France
- Germany
- Greece
- Hungary
- (Republic of Ireland) Ireland
- Italy
- Latvia
- Lithuania
- Luxembourg
- Malta
- Netherlands
- Poland
- Portugal
- Romania
- Slovakia
- Slovenia
- Spain
- Sweden

== See also ==
- Council for European Palestinian Relations
- Arab League–European Union relations
- Israel–European Union relations
