= Finland–Palestine relations =

- Finland: Palestine

Finland–Palestine relations refer to foreign relations between Finland and the State of Palestine. Finland supports a two-state solution to the Israel-Palestine conflict. Finland does not recognize Palestine as an independent state.

Taissir Al Adjouri is the Palestinian Ambassador to Finland. There is a Representative Office of Finland in Ramallah.

== History ==
Palestine opened a representative office in Finland in the 1980s. Finland started cooperating with the Palestinians in development in 1994. Finland opened a representative office in Ramallah in 1999.

In 2014, Finland upgraded its office in Ramallah to a diplomatic post and made the head an ambassador. Finland allocated €24 million to Palestine for the 2021 to 2024 period covering education, state building, civil society, and strengthening resilience. It provided €2 million to hospitals in East Jerusalem in 2021. It signed a multi year agreement with United Nations Relief and Works Agency for Palestine Refugees in the Near East on 29 March 2023. Finland's aid is focused on East Jerusalem, Gaza, and Area C of West Bank.

Finland condemned Hamas following the 2023 Hamas-led attack on Israel and launched a review of its aid to Palestine. The review submitted its report in December confirming no funds of Finland went to Hamas. Elina Valtonen, Foreign Minister of Finland, reiterated Finland's support for a two-state solution. She stated that a few citizens were trapped in Gaza. Finland is also purchasing a US$345 million David's Sling, an air defense system, from Israel. The deal has been criticized due to Israel's actions in Gaza.

In July 2025, the president of Finland, Alexander Stubb, announced that he is ready to approve recognition of a Palestinian state, but only if the Finnish government formally proposes it. However, on 8 August, prime minister Petteri Orpo, stated at a council of the National Coalition Party that the government is not preparing to recognise Palestine.

== See also ==
- Foreign relations of Finland
- Foreign relations of Palestine
- Palestine-EU relations
- AL-EU relations
- International recognition of Palestine
- Finland–Israel relations
