= Palestine–Poland relations =

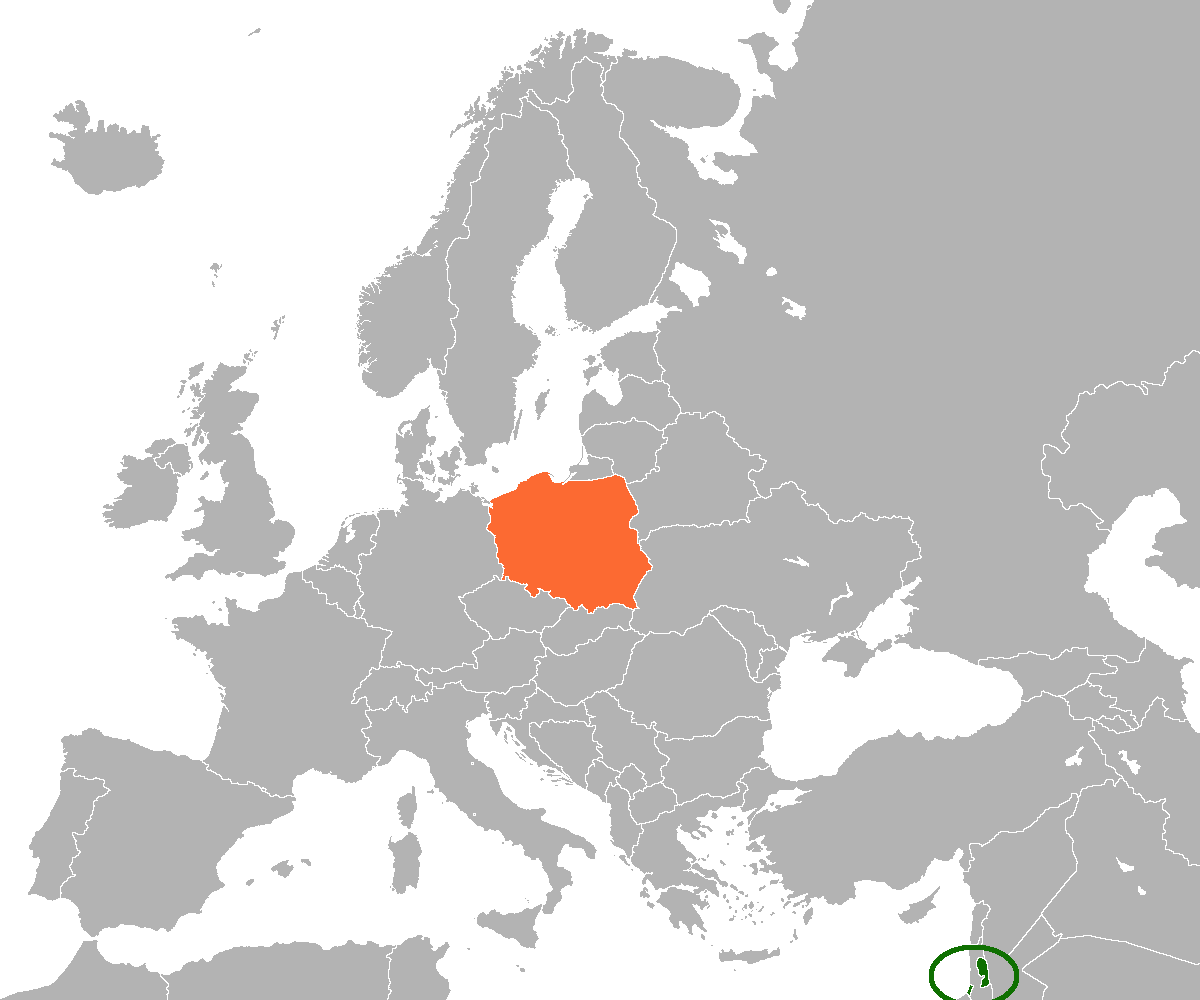

- Palestine: Poland

Diplomatic mission
- Representative office of Poland, Ramallah: Embassy of Palestine, Warsaw

Official relations between Poland and the Palestine Liberation Organization (PLO) date back to the 1970s, when a PLO representative office was opened in 1976.

== History ==
Diplomatic relations between Poland and the PLO began on 9 July 1982, when the representative office of the PLO in Warsaw (which had existed since 1976) was appointed as the official diplomatic mission of the PLO to Poland, and the head of the mission was appointed ambassador.

Poland recognized the Palestinian Declaration of Independence issued by the Palestinian National Council in Algiers in 1988, and in 1989 the embassy of the PLO was renamed as the Embassy of the State of Palestine (since 1995 using the name "Embassy of Palestine"), with all privileges and rights enjoyed by other missions accredited to Poland. Poland accepted that the Ambassador of the State of Palestine be the extraordinary ambassador to Poland since 2000. In 2013, president B. Komorowski visited Bethlehem, in 2016, president Abbas paid a visit to Poland which was reciprocated by president Duda’s visit to Bethlehem in 2017. Polish Foreign Ministers visited Ramallah in 2015 and 2016. Poland supports the right of the Palestinian people to self-governance and its aspirations to achieving an independent Palestinian state as a result of the Middle East peace process.

Poland is one of the European countries that support the resolution of the Palestinian-Israeli conflict peacefully based on the two-state solution. There is parliamentary cooperation between Palestine and Poland and the exchange of parliamentary delegations. There is also close cooperation in various fields such as tourism, education, sports and military security. Poland provides annual support through aid for development projects in Palestine. Since 2006, Poland has been providing support in education, health care, and humanitarian aid to Palestinian refugees via UNRWA. The Association of Palestinian Alumni from Polish Universities, as well as a scholarship assistance programs for students (including Łukasiewicz and Erasmus programme), were established. Poland assists the Palestinian National Authority with assistance grants, via Polish NGO’s as well as contributing to the voluntary fund for Palestinian refugees.

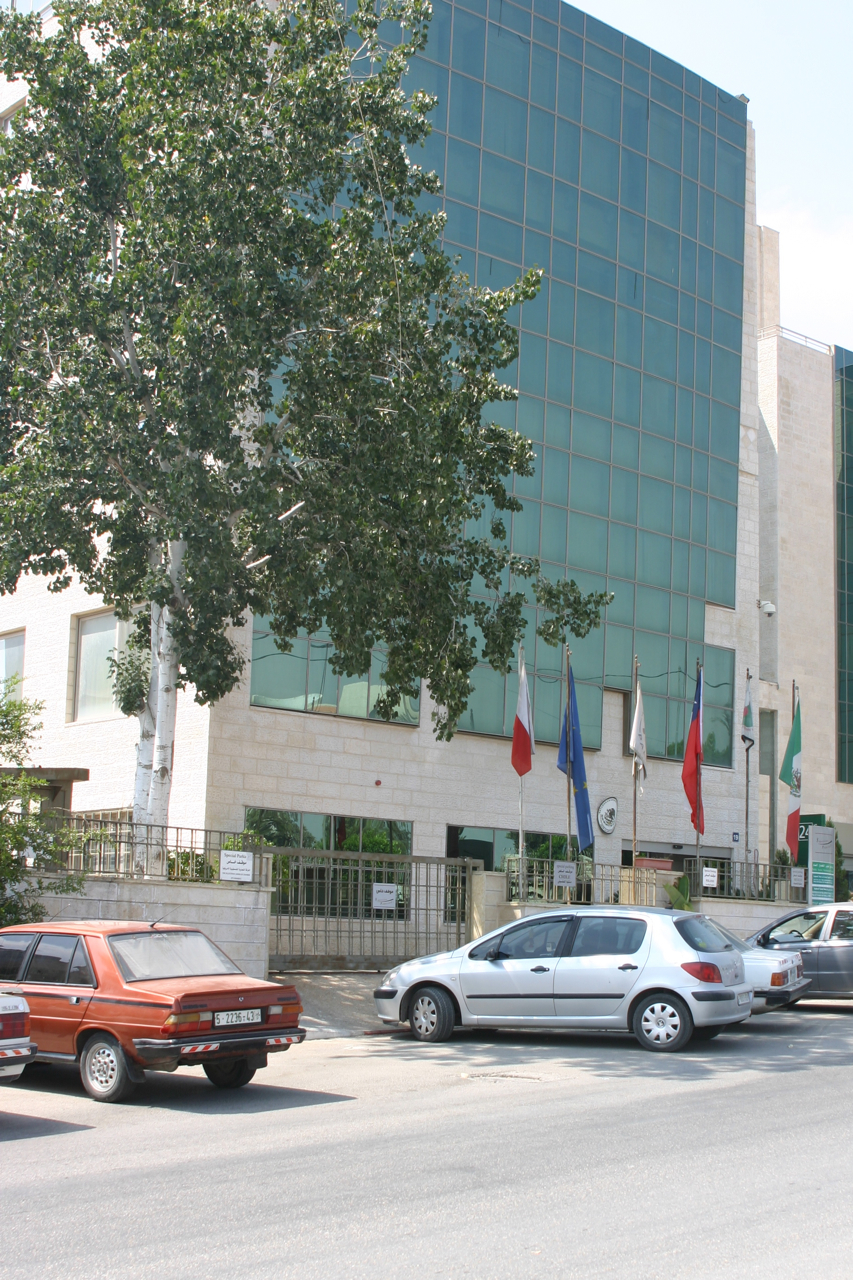
Building hosting the Representative Office of the Republic of Poland in Ramallah

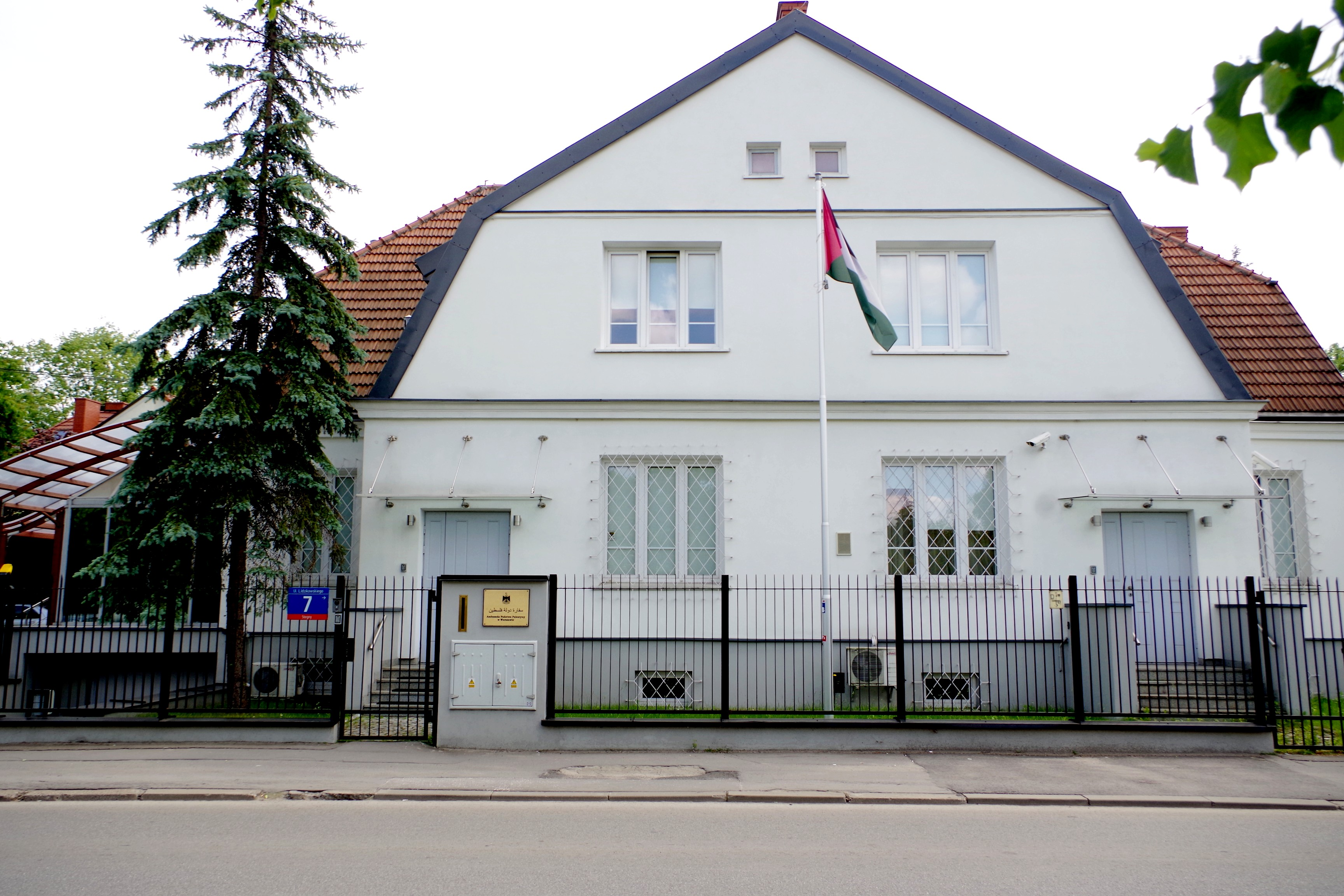
Embassy of Palestine in Warsaw

Poland participated in the training of a number of Palestinian diplomats, policemen and border guards. The Polish border guards trained 72 Palestinian policemen in 2016.

Poland's abstention in favor of a General Assembly resolution rejecting any measures to change the situation in Jerusalem stems from the Polish view that voting in favor of the resolution will not bring the solution between the two sides closer. In October 2021, the Polish ambassador to Palestine confirmed that the relations between the two countries were at their best stage and that there were further efforts to strengthen them at multiple levels.

To help fight the COVID-19 pandemic in Palestine, Poland in cooperation with Polish Caritas donated medical equipment in December 2020. In February 2022, Poland donated 300,000 COVID-19 vaccines to Palestine.

In July 2022, a Polish parliamentary delegation visited Palestine and paid tribute to the late President Yasser Arafat. They also described Israel as an apartheid state.

In April 2024, Poland provided an emergency funding of USD 1 million to UNRWA.

== See also ==
- Foreign relations of Poland
- Foreign relations of the State of Palestine
- Palestine-EU relations
- AL-EU relations
- International recognition of the State of Palestine
