= France–Palestine relations =

- France: Palestine

France–Palestine relations refer to the political, cultural and economic relations between France and the State of Palestine. France formally recognized the State of Palestine on 22 September 2025 and supports a two-state solution to the Israeli–Palestinian conflict.

== History ==
France supports the creation of an independent Palestine. France believes Jerusalem should be the shared capital of Israel and a future Palestinian state. France's attempts to introduce resolutions in the United Nations calling for an independent Palestinian state were opposed by the United States. A survey found 80% of French people support France recognizing Palestine.

In 1967 following the Six-Day War, Charles De Gaulle controversially said that when Israel was created "there were those who feared that the Jews, who through long years of dispersion had remained what they had always been-an elitist people, self-assured and domineering-would once gathered in the site of their former grandeur, transform into a burn for conquest the tender longing of nineteen centuries". It marked a change in France's stance as it started to develop its ties with the Arab world from a realistic perspective. It held talks with the Palestinian Liberation Organization despite it carrying out terrorist attacks in France targeting Israel.

France provided over €500 million to the Palestinian territory from 2008 to 2017. In March 2023, France condemned Bezalel Smotrich, Minister of Finance of Israel, for saying Palestine was a recent invention in Paris during the memorial service of Jacques Kupfer organized by Israel is forever. He spoke from a podium with a map of Greater Israel containing the Palestinian territories and Jordan.

In 2014, the French parliament passed a resolution urging their government to recognize Palestine as a state, with the intention of facilitating a definitive resolution to the conflict. A United Nations Security Council resolution proposed in 2014, calling for the end of Israeli occupation and statehood by 2017, did not pass due to opposition and abstentions.

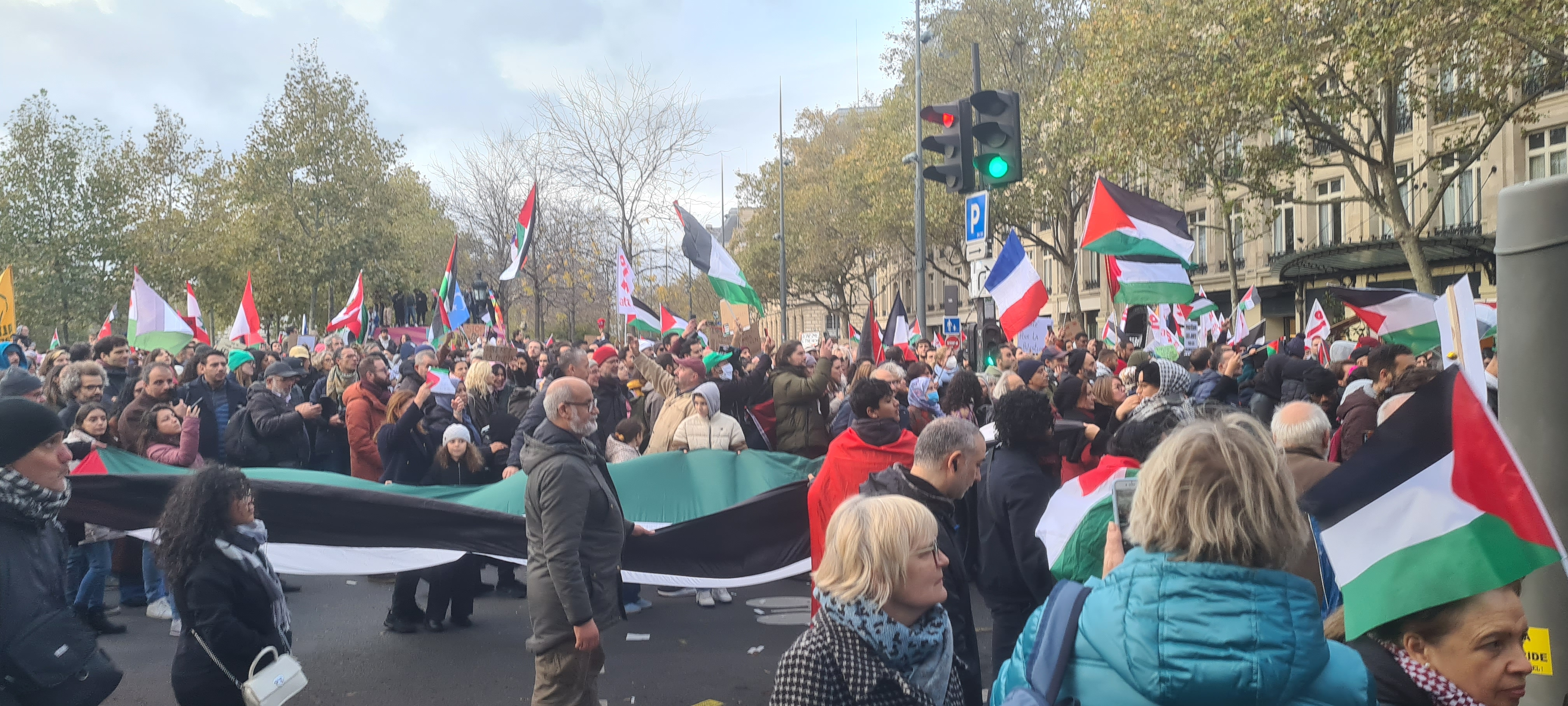
A November 2023 demonstration calling for a ceasefire in Gaza.

Alain Gresh described Emmanuel Macron's Renaissance as being anti-Palestinian. On 24 October 2023, France called for a ceasefire in the Gaza war. Macron criticized the civilian death toll in the conflict. He proposed using the Anti-IS coalition against Hamas which was rejected by the international community. The war showed divisions along ethnic and religious lines in France, which home to more than six million Muslims and the largest Jewish population in Europe. France launched a crackdown on pro-Palestinian groups and banned protests in favor of Palestine after the Hamas attacks.

France has delivered several airdrops with humanitarian aid to Gaza in cooperation with Jordanian and Dutch air forces during the Gaza war.

In March 2025, France supported the Arab plans for the rebuilding of Gaza. A UN conference organized by both France and Saudi Arabia on the two-state solution for Israel/Palestine began on July 28, 2025 (postponed from June because of the outbreak of the Iran-Israel war) and concluded two days later. In an address to the Parliament of the United Kingdom in July 2025, Emmanuel Macron called for France and the United Kingdom to recognise the State of Palestine. Macron then announced that France would officially recognize Palestine during the eightieth session of the United Nations General Assembly in September 2025. In response, the United States and Israel condemned the move, with the United States Secretary of State, Marco Rubio, rejecting Macron's plan, calling it a "reckless decision" and "only serves Hamas propaganda."

== See also ==
- Foreign relations of France
- Foreign relations of Palestine
- France–Israel relations
- Palestine–European Union relations
- Arab League–European Union relations
- Saved Treasures of Gaza: 5000 Years of History
