= Bulgaria–Palestine relations =

- Bulgaria: Palestine

Bulgaria–Palestine relations are the bilateral relations between Bulgaria and Palestine. Diplomatic relations were established in February 1973 following the recognition of the Palestine Liberation Organization (PLO) as the legal representative of the Palestinian people. In 1988, Bulgaria recognized the Palestinian Declaration of Independence, thus recognizing Palestinian statehood.

== History ==
The People's Republic of Bulgaria is alleged to have unofficially supported the "Palestinian cause" in the prelude to the Six-Day War in 1967. On the 10th of June, the day the on which the six-day war ended, Bulgaria officially broke off diplomatic ties with Israel.

In February 1973, Bulgaria officially established relations with the Palestine Liberation Organization, following the PLO's recognition as the legal representative of the Palestinian people. The same year, the leader of the Palestine Liberation Organization, Yasser Arafat, made an official visit to Bulgaria. A Palestinian diplomatic mission was established in the Bulgarian capital, Sofia, in August 1974.

In November, 1988, following the Palestinian Declaration of Independence, Bulgaria recognized a Palestine state. Following this, the Palestinian mission in Sofia received the status of Embassy.

In November 1990, amidst the fall of communism across the eastern bloc, the communist government was removed from power and the People's Republic of Bulgaria was abolished, in favour of the Republic of Bulgaria. However, despite the change in regime, the country's policies towards Palestine remained largely unchanged.

In 2008, Bulgaria opened a representative office in Ramallah, a Palestinian city in the West Bank.

In March 2018, President Rumen Radev visited Ramallah and met with President Mahmoud Abbas. Prime Minister Boyko Borisov made an official visit to Palestine in June 2018, meeting with his Palestinian counterpart Rami Hamdallah. On 27 November 2018, a group of representatives from Bulgaria visited the Yasser Arafat Memorial.

== See also ==
- Foreign relations of Bulgaria
- Foreign relations of Palestine
- Palestine-EU relations
- AL-EU relations
- Bulgaria–Israel relations
