= Aid to Palestinians =

Aid to Palestinians may refer to:

- United Nations Relief and Works Agency for Palestine Refugees in the Near East (UNRWA)
- International aid to Palestinians
- Medical Aid for Palestinians
- Aid to the Palestinians, from the European Union
