= Israel–European Union relations =

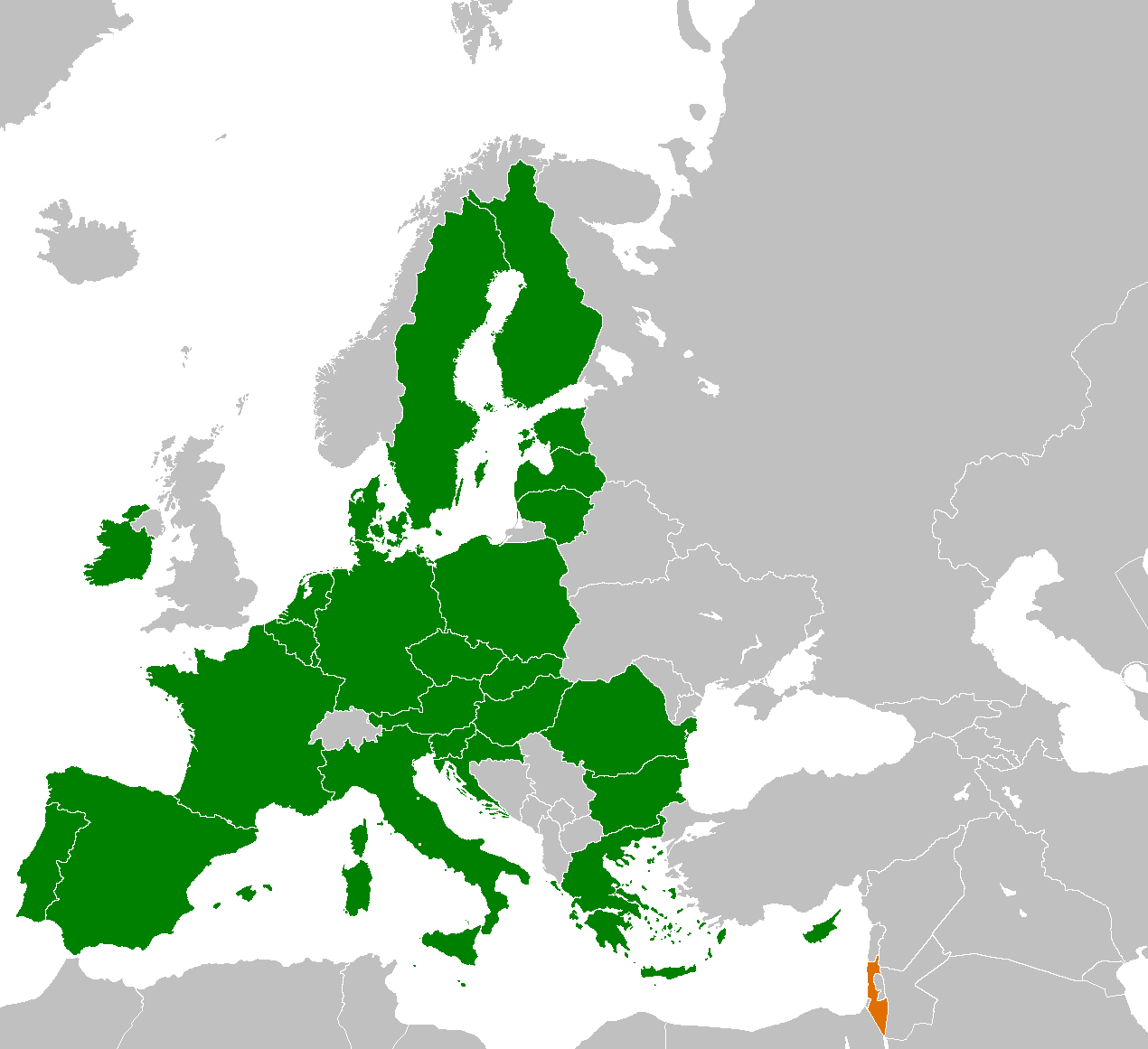
- European Union: Israel

Relations between Israel and the European Union are generally positive on the economic level, though affected by the Israeli–Palestinian conflict on the political level. In particular, Israel views four decades of EU declarations on the Israeli–Palestinian conflict as one-sided and pro-Palestinian.

Israel is associated with the EU through the 1995 Association Agreement; several other agreements cover sectoral issues. In addition, the relations between the two are framed in the European Neighbourhood Policy (ENP), the Euro-Mediterranean Partnership, and the Union for the Mediterranean.

== Historical background ==
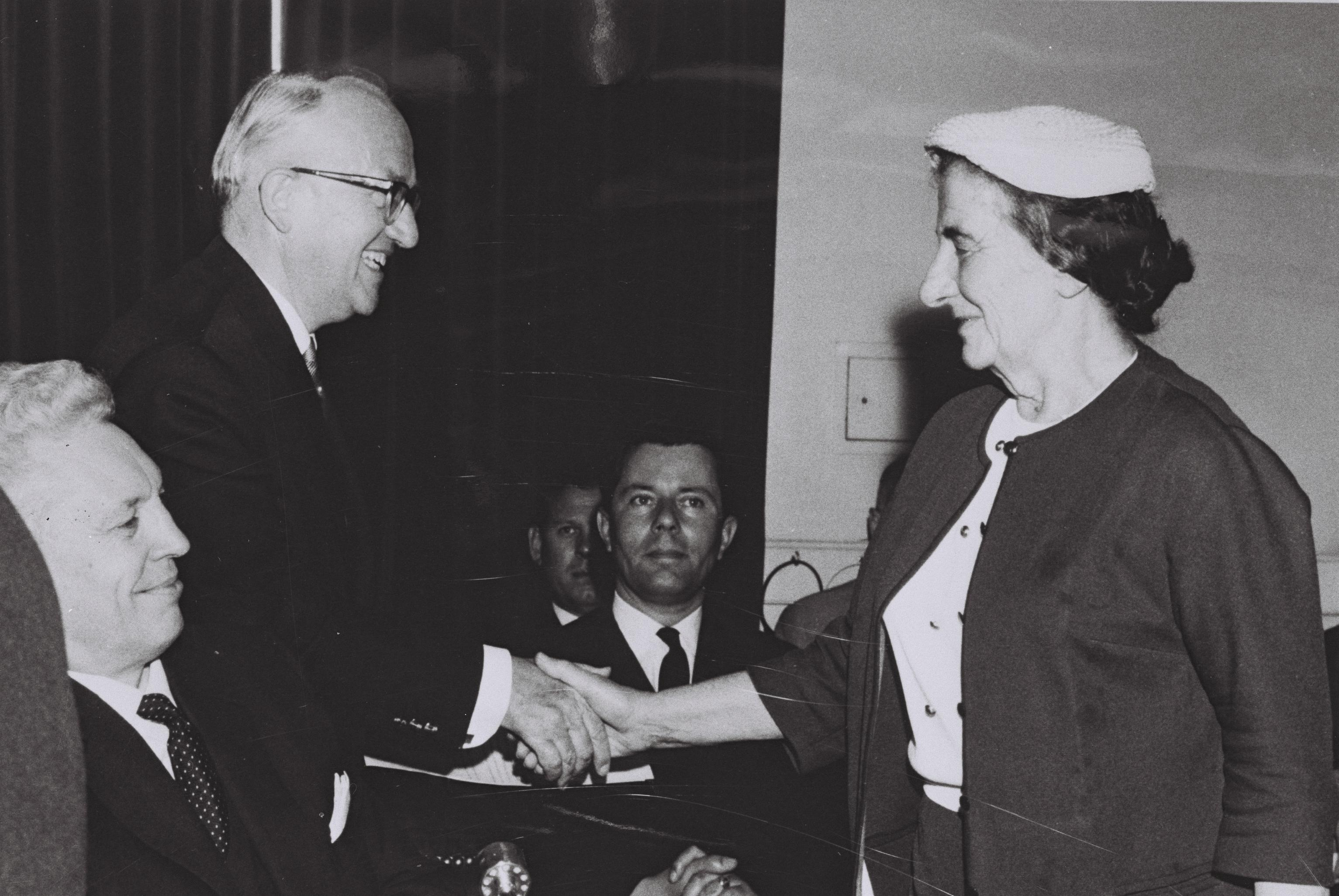
Golda Meir and Walter Hallstein, the first president of the Commission of the EEC, 1964

The State of Israel was founded in 1948, while the European Economic Community—the direct predecessor of the European Union—was established in 1957. Already before the formation of the EU, the 1956 Suez Crisis highlighted the European countries lack of unity on Middle East policy. While France and the UK took military action with Israel, other states, notably West Germany, distanced themselves, focusing instead on postwar recovery and maintaining strong relations with the United States.

Israel and the European Economic Community established diplomatic relations as early as 1959. A first free trade area agreement was signed in 1975. The Venice Declaration of June 1980 marked a turning point in the European Community’s approach to the Israeli–Palestinian conflict. It was the first joint recognition of the Palestinians’ right to self-determination and called for their inclusion in peace talks, while affirming Israel’s right to security. The declaration signaled a shift from earlier unilateral actions, such as during the Suez Crisis, toward a more 'balanced' stance, distinct from the strongly pro-Israel position of the United States. The EC presented itself as a neutral mediator grounded in international law and as a key economic partner to both sides. In the early 1990s, around the time of the Oslo Accords, the EU strengthened its position as a key financial contributor and backer of the peace process. Adopting the role of a “civilian power,” it aimed to advance peace through economic support, institution-building in the Palestinian territories, and diplomatic engagement. In the Essen Council in 1994, the EU signaled its willingness to establish special relations with Israel.

Multilaterally, Israel takes part in the 1995 Barcelona process (Euro-Mediterranean Partnership), and the subsequent 2008 Union for the Mediterranean, and since 2003 in the European Neighbourhood Policy (ENP).

Bilaterally, after a Cooperation Agreement in 1975, an Association Agreement came into force in 2000, providing for preferential economic, commercial, technological and research status between the parties. It included measures for the creation of a free trade area in industrial goods, and the liberalisation of trade in agricultural goods, of services, and of capital movements. The agreement also set the basis for cultural, research and political cooperation.

=== EU–Israel Association Agreement (2000) ===
The EU–Israel Association Agreement forms the legal basis governing relations between Israel and the European Union, modeled on the network of Euro-Mediterranean Agreements between the Union and its partners in the southern flank of the Mediterranean Sea.

The agreement with Israel incorporates free trade arrangements for industrial goods and concessionary arrangements for trade in agricultural products (a new agreement here entered into force in 2004), and opens up the prospect for greater liberalisation of trade in services and farm goods from 2005. The Association Agreement was signed in Brussels on 20 November 1995, and entered into force on 1 June 2000, following ratification by the 15 Member States’ Parliaments, the European Parliament and the Knesset. It replaces the earlier Co-operation Agreement of 1975.

The Association Agreement established two main bodies for the EU–Israel dialogue. The EU–Israel Association Council (held at ministerial level) and the EU–Israel Association Committee (held at the level of senior officials) meet at regular intervals to discuss political and economic issues, as well as bilateral and regional co-operation.

Article 2 of the Association Agreement states:

Relations between the Parties, as well as all the provisions of the Agreement itself, shall be based on respect for human rights and democratic principles, which guides their internal and international policy and constitutes an essential element of this Agreement.

In October 2024 Spain and Ireland requested the European Commission to suspend the Association Agreement as human rights (article 2) are being violated by Israel due to its invasion of Lebanon.

In June 2025, the former EU foreign policy chief Josep Borrell stated that, "since the EU foreign affairs ministers found [in June 2025] that Israel was not respecting these rights, EU leaders now have a legal obligation to suspend the agreement" and continued: "However, despite all my efforts to this end" as incumbent, "the EU and most EU governments have so far failed to...exert pressure on the Israeli government". In April 2026, Spain, Ireland, and Slovenia renewed the push to suspend the agreement at an EU foreign ministers' meeting, but the move was blocked by Germany and Italy, which vetoed the proposal.

==== Dispute on preferential treatment for Israeli products originating in Palestinian territories ====
Goods from Israeli settlements in the occupied Palestinian territories are not subject to the free trade agreement, as they are not considered Israeli.

Since 1998, Israel and the EU have been in dispute over the legal treatment of products exported to the EU from the occupied Palestinian territories. Israel argues that these are produced in its customs territory and should thus be subject to the Association Agreement and benefit from preferential treatment. The EU maintains that the territories are not part of Israel, and are illegal under international law, and such products do not therefore benefit from preferential treatment.

A 2001 avis by the European Commission confirmed the lack of preferential status for such products, inducing infuriated reactions from Israel, though the economic significance of the territories-based Israeli products is very limited (€100 mln/year over a total of €6 bln/year). Unlike the EU, the United States admits custom-free goods exported from the territories under their 1985 free trade agreement.

A solution was negotiated in 2004, whereby the Israeli authorities would specify on the certificate of origin the geographic location of the production site (e.g., Israel, Barkan), without having to specify whether the goods originated in the territories. The EU customs authorities are then able to discern the exact origin and provide preferential treatment only to goods from Israel proper, giving de facto meaning to the EU policy of non-recognition of the territories as part of the State of Israel

The 2010 ruling of the European Court of Justice in the Brita case confirmed that products originating in the West Bank do not qualify for preferential customs treatment under the EC–Israel Agreement, and that contrary assertions by Israeli authorities are not binding upon EU customs authorities. In its reasoning, the ECJ relied on the presence of two, distinct and equal association agreements, one with Israel, applying to the "territory of the State of Israel", and one with the PLO, applying to the territory of the West Bank and the Gaza Strip, and on the general principle of customary international law that an obligation cannot be imposed on a third party without its consent. The court concluded that the EC–Israel Agreement may not be interpreted in such a way as to compel the Palestinian authorities to waive their right to exercise the competence conferred upon them by virtue of the EC–PLO Agreement and, in particular, to refrain from exercising the right to issue customs documents providing proof of origin for goods manufactured in the West Bank and the Gaza Strip. It follows that products originating in the West Bank do not fall within the territorial scope of the EC–Israel Agreement and, therefore, do not qualify for preferential treatment under that agreement.

In 2015, the Israeli Foreign Ministry announced that "Israel is suspending its diplomatic dialogue with the EU in various forums" due to a policy passed by the EU to label products from the West Bank. Israel expressed displeasure that "the EU has chosen, for political reasons, to take such an exceptional and discriminatory step, inspired by the boycott movement, particularly at this time, when Israel is confronting a wave of terrorism targeting any and all of its citizens", adding that the labelling decision would "have implications for Israel–EU relations." The Prime Minister of Israel, Benjamin Netanyahu, reiterated that the decision was "hypocritical and [set] a double standard", adding that the EU "should be ashamed" of its actions. The United States said it did not regard the EU move as a boycott.

=== Sectoral agreements ===
==== ACAA free trade agreement in pharmaceuticals (2012) ====
The Agreements on Conformity Assessment and Acceptance of Industrial Products (ACAA) which focus on pharmaceutical products were adopted by the European Parliament on 23 October 2012, following a debate that had lasted for more than two years. Ratification of the ACAA will make it easier to export Israeli pharmaceuticals and other goods to the 27 EU member countries, and vice versa. Following a controversial debate, 379 members of the European Parliament voted in favor and 230 against ratification. The ACAA are in conformity with the Brita ruling on the non-preferential access of goods produced in the Israeli settlements.

==== Open skies agreement ====
In June 2013, Israel and the EU signed an open skies agreement. The agreement entered into force on 2 August 2020.

== Fields of cooperation ==
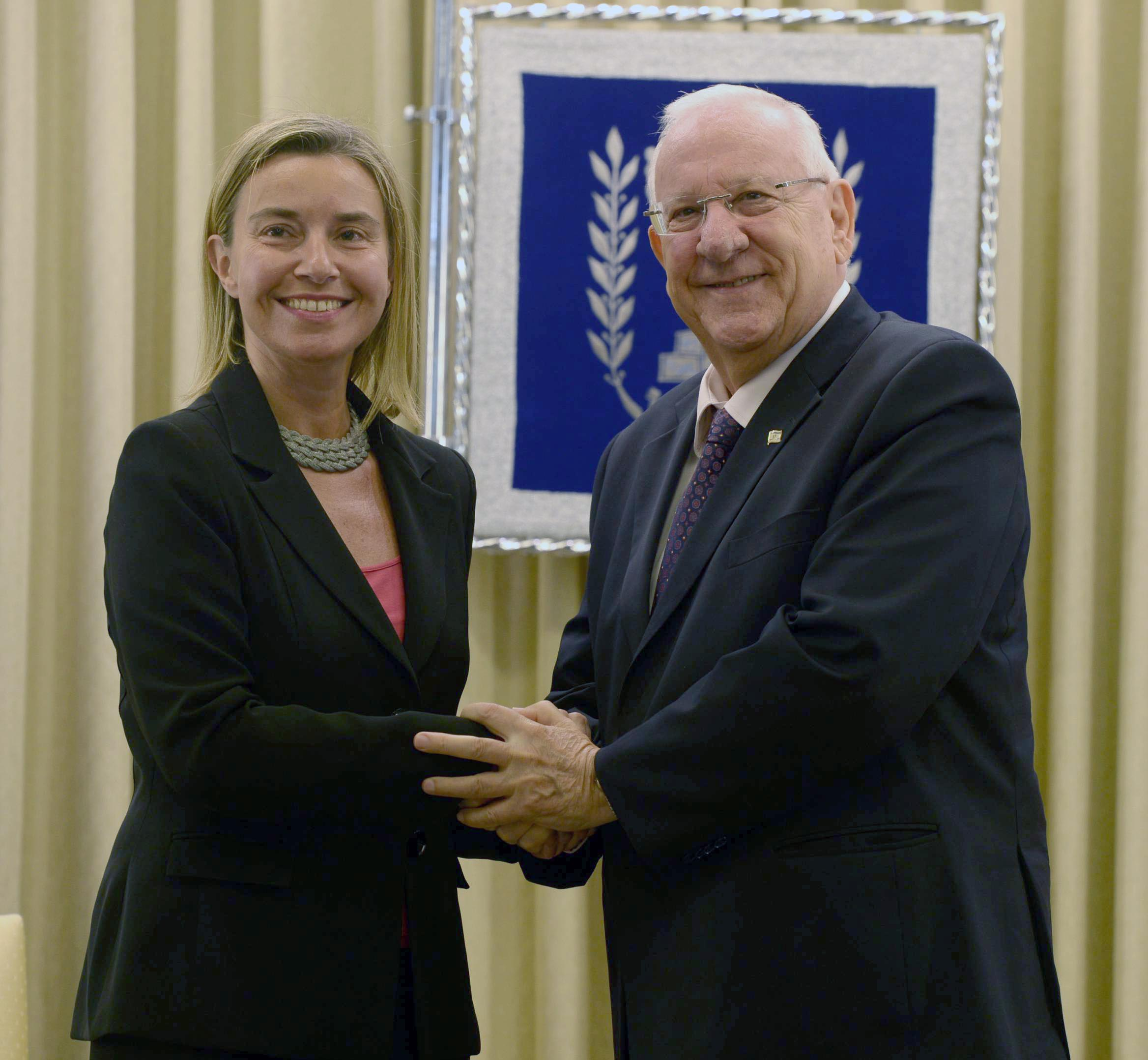
Israeli President Reuven Rivlin with Federica Mogherini, 2015

=== Trade ===
Trade between the EU and Israel is conducted on the basis of the Association Agreement. The European Union is Israel’s biggest trading partner. In 2013 the total volume of bilateral trade (excluding diamonds) came to over €27 billion. In 2013, 32% of Israel’s exports (excluding diamonds) went to the EU, and 34% of its imports (excluding diamonds) came from the EU.

Total EU trade with Israel rose from €19.4 billion in 2003 to €31.0 billion in 2012 and €31.4 billion in 2013. EU exports to Israel reached €17.9 billion in 2013, while imports from Israel were €13.5 billion. The trade deficit with Israel was €4.4 billion in the EU’s favour in 2013.

Under the Euro-Mediterranean Agreement, the EU and Israel have free trade in industrial products. The two sides have granted each other significant trade concessions for certain agricultural products, in the form of tariff reduction or elimination, either within quotas or for unlimited quantities.

=== Science and culture ===
Israel was the first non-European country to be associated to the European Union's Framework Programme for Research and Technical Development (RTD). Israel's special status is the result of its high level of scientific and research capability and the dense network of long-standing relations in scientific and technical co-operation between Israel and the EU. The European Commission signed an agreement with Israel in July 2004 allowing for its participation in the EU's Galileo project for a global navigation satellite system. As of 2014, Israel was a member of the European science organization, CERN, becoming the only non-European member.

=== Euro-Mediterranean regional programmes ===
Israel, because of its high national income, is not eligible for bilateral funding under MEDA. It has, however, been involved in a wide variety of Euro-Mediterranean regional programmes funded under MEDA:

- Young Israelis participate in youth exchange programmes with their European and Mediterranean counterparts under the Euro-Med Youth Action Programme.
- Israeli filmmakers have benefited from funding and training under the Euro-Med Audiovisual Programme.
- Israeli universities participate in the FEMISE forum of economic institutes while chambers of commerce and employers associations have participated in programmes like UNIMED and ArchiMedes.
- Such institutes as the Israel Antiquities Authority participate in Euromed Cultural Heritage.

== Open issues ==
=== Inter-relation with Middle East peace process policy ===
The European Union attaches great importance to the finding of a just and final settlement to the Arab–Israeli conflict and supports initiatives to further the Israeli–Palestinian peace process, through the role of the Special Envoy for the Middle East Peace Process through its involvement in support of the Quartet (EU, US, Russia, UN), its programmes of humanitarian and other assistance for Palestinians in the West Bank and the Gaza Strip, by virtue of the commitments entered into by Israel, the Palestinian Authority and the EU in the European Neighbourhood Policy Action Plans, as well as through programmes for civil society and people-to-people contacts. The EU is also the largest donor of aid to the Palestinian autonomous areas.

The EU has been more critical of Israel and more supportive of the Palestinians than the US. The general position of the EU is that a Palestinian state should be based on the 1967 borders with land swaps, Jerusalem should be divided and become the capital of both states, and a negotiated settlement be found for the Palestinian refugee issue, although member states have sometimes been divided on these issues. However, all EU states universally consider Israeli settlements illegal under international law. The EU has insisted that it will not recognize any changes to the 1967 borders other than those agreed between the parties. Israel's settlement program has, thus, led to tensions. The most difficult of these issues, however, is Jerusalem. Israel has insisted that the city will remain its undivided capital, and is fiercely opposed to its re-division. Israel does not regard Jewish neighborhoods in East Jerusalem as settlements, while the EU does. East Jerusalem has been a de facto part of Israel following Israel's unilateral annexation of the area, while the EU, along with the rest of the international community, regards it as occupied territory subject to negotiations. The EU has frequently criticized Jewish construction in East Jerusalem.

In 2008, during the French presidency of the Council, the European Union strived to increase co-operation with the US on Middle-Eastern issues, inter alia with a view to coordinating common pressures on Israel. In late 2009 and 2010, a Swedish-drafted EU paper called for Jerusalem to be divided and become the joint capital of Israel and a Palestinian state, and criticized Israel's building in East Jerusalem. The draft was met with Israeli opposition and was eventually not adopted.

European Union foreign ministers welcomed Prime Minister Benjamin Netanyahu's conditional endorsement of a future Palestinian state in June 2009, but said it was not enough to raise EU-Israel ties to a higher level and questioned the conditions set for backing a Palestinian state and Netanyahu's defense of Jewish settlements. In December 2010, a group of 26 former EU statesmen, including former Foreign Affairs Chief Javier Solana, submitted a written petition calling for the EU to ban imports of settlement products, force Israel to pay the majority of aid required by the Palestinians, link an upgrade in diplomatic relations to a settlement freeze, and send a high-level delegation to east Jerusalem to support Palestinian claims to sovereignty. The request was rebuffed by Foreign Affairs Chief Catherine Ashton.

Allegations of anti-Israel bias and a "new antisemitism" from within the EU have been raised by eurosceptics, such as Nigel Farage from the UK Independence Party. Eurosceptic MEPs such as Farage have also criticised an alleged 300 million euros per annum (as of 2009) going to the Palestinian National Authority from the EU.

The EU has also been highly critical of Israeli military actions in the Palestinian territories and Lebanon, often referring to them as "disproportionate" and "excessive force" and calling for an immediate cease-fire. During Operation Defensive Shield in 2002, the European Parliament passed a non-binding resolution calling for economic sanctions on Israel and an arms embargo on both parties. Following the Gaza War, the European Parliament endorsed the Goldstone Report. The EU has also been critical of Israel's Gaza blockade, referring to it as "collective punishment."

EU member states had no common response to the Palestinian Authority's announcement that it would declare independence in September 2011, through the Palestine 194 diplomatic campaign to gain membership for the State of Palestine in the United Nations. Some stated that they might recognize the state if talks did not progress, or to punish Israel for settlement construction. When Palestine was admitted to UNESCO as a full member in October 2011, five EU members states were among the 14 countries that joined Israel in voting against (Czech Republic, Germany, Lithuania, Netherlands and Sweden); eleven voted in favour of Palestinian membership (Austria, Belgium, Cyprus, Finland, France, Greece, Ireland, Luxembourg, Malta, Slovenia, Spain) and eleven abstained (Bulgaria, Denmark, Estonia, Hungary, Italy, Latvia, Poland, Portugal, Romania, Slovakia, United Kingdom).

In 2011 incoming president of the European Parliament Martin Schulz confirmed that relations with Israel will remain frozen until there is movement on the peace process.

A classified working paper produced by European embassies in Israel, parts of which were obtained by the Haaretz newspaper, recommended that the European Union should consider Israel's treatment of its Arab citizens a "core issue, not second tier to the Israeli-Palestinian conflict". Other issues considered material to relations with Israel include the lack of progress in the peace process, the continued occupation of the Palestinian territories, Israel's definition of itself as Jewish and democratic, and the influence of the Israeli Arab population. Israel's Foreign Ministry replied that the EU members of the Security Council called this "inappropriate bickering" that would make them "irrelevant", and accused the EU of "interfering" in Israel's internal affairs. However, the EU had a divided internal reaction to the working paper: countries including Britain were seeking concrete punitive measures against Israel if they did not address Israeli Arab issues, while other countries including Poland and the Netherlands made their opposition clear to such actions. The final paper did not include any specific EU planned actions on the matters it discussed.

A classified document by EU delegates, obtained by Yedioth Ahronoth, suggested funding Palestinian construction projects in Area C of the West Bank without Israel's cooperation, undermining Israeli control. Under the Oslo Accords, Area C is under full Israeli civil and security control. It contains all of Israel's West Bank settlements and a small Palestinian population. The document expressed concern that Israel's policies would undermine the prospect of a Palestinian state on the 1967 borders, and called on Israel to support Palestinian construction across Area C and in East Jerusalem.

A published EU report in early 2012 made an urgent call for the EU to adopt a more "active and visible" implementation of its policy towards Israel and the peace process. A potentially radical proposal for "appropriate EU legislation to prevent/discourage financial transactions in support of settlement activity" was the first indication that some member states were seeking European divestment from businesses actively involved in the settlement enterprise. Under one interpretation of the proposal, the Commission would use legislation to force companies in Europe to break their links with businesses involved in settlement construction and commercial activities. The report also recommended the EU prepare a blacklist of settlers involved in violence, in order to possibly ban them from entering EU member states, encourage PLO activity and representation in east Jerusalem, and for senior EU officials to avoid being escorted by Israeli representatives or security personnel in east Jerusalem. The issue of the PLO/Fatah and East Jerusalem has been a flashpoint between Israel and many EU countries because EU diplomats have often met their Palestinian counterparts in the city but have rarely met with Israeli government officials there (even in West Jerusalem, which the EU sees as a current and future part of Israel), which also ties into how the EU has tried to present Tel Aviv as the Israeli capital even though the central seat of government and most government facilities are located in Jerusalem.

Another 2012 EU report recommended that the EU undermine Israeli control of Area C of the West Bank by pursuing and funding Palestinian building projects undertaken without receiving Israeli building permits, which are required in Area C.

EU foreign policy chief Catherine Ashton said she was following with great concern the case of Khader Adnan, a prisoner on hunger strike detained without trial by Israel. Adnan ended his hunger strike after 66 days, after reaching a deal with prosecutors an hour before his case was due to be heard by the Supreme Court of Israel. The EU has been critical of Israel's system of administrative detention.

In 2013 the EU adopted a binding directive according to which the Israeli government will be required to state in any future agreements with the EU that settlements in the West Bank, including East Jerusalem are outside the state of Israel. The directive partially implements an earlier EU foreign ministers' declaration that "all agreements between the state of Israel and the EU must unequivocally and explicitly indicate their inapplicability to the territories occupied by Israel in 1967". The guidelines prohibit the issuing of EU grants, funding, prizes or scholarships to Israeli entities unless a settlement exclusion clause is included. Israeli institutions and bodies situated across the pre-1967 Green Line will be automatically ineligible. The EU directive is similar to the one signed between the United States and Israel in 1972 whereby Israel undertook, in exchange for science funding, to restrict the projects within the 1967 borders. The guidelines do not restrict grants issued by individual EU member states. In advance of the publication of the Guidelines, there was, in Israel, a political and media storm. News Media have suggested Israel will take some action against the EU. Maja Kocijancic, spokeswoman for EU foreign policy chief Catherine Ashton, has said: "The EU is concerned by reports in the Israeli media that the Israeli Minister of Defense has announced a number of restrictions affecting EU activities supporting the Palestinian people. We have not received any official communication from the Israeli authorities. Our delegations on the spot are seeking urgent clarifications".

Israel responded to this initiative by declaring that it will not sign any future agreements with the EU until it "clarifies" its position that no Israeli organization with connections beyond the Green Line can cooperate or receive EU funding.

Since Sweden's recognition of Palestine in 2014, an increasing number of EU member states have considered formally recognizing the State of Palestine. By 2024, ten of the EU member states recognize Palestina.

=== Gaza war ===
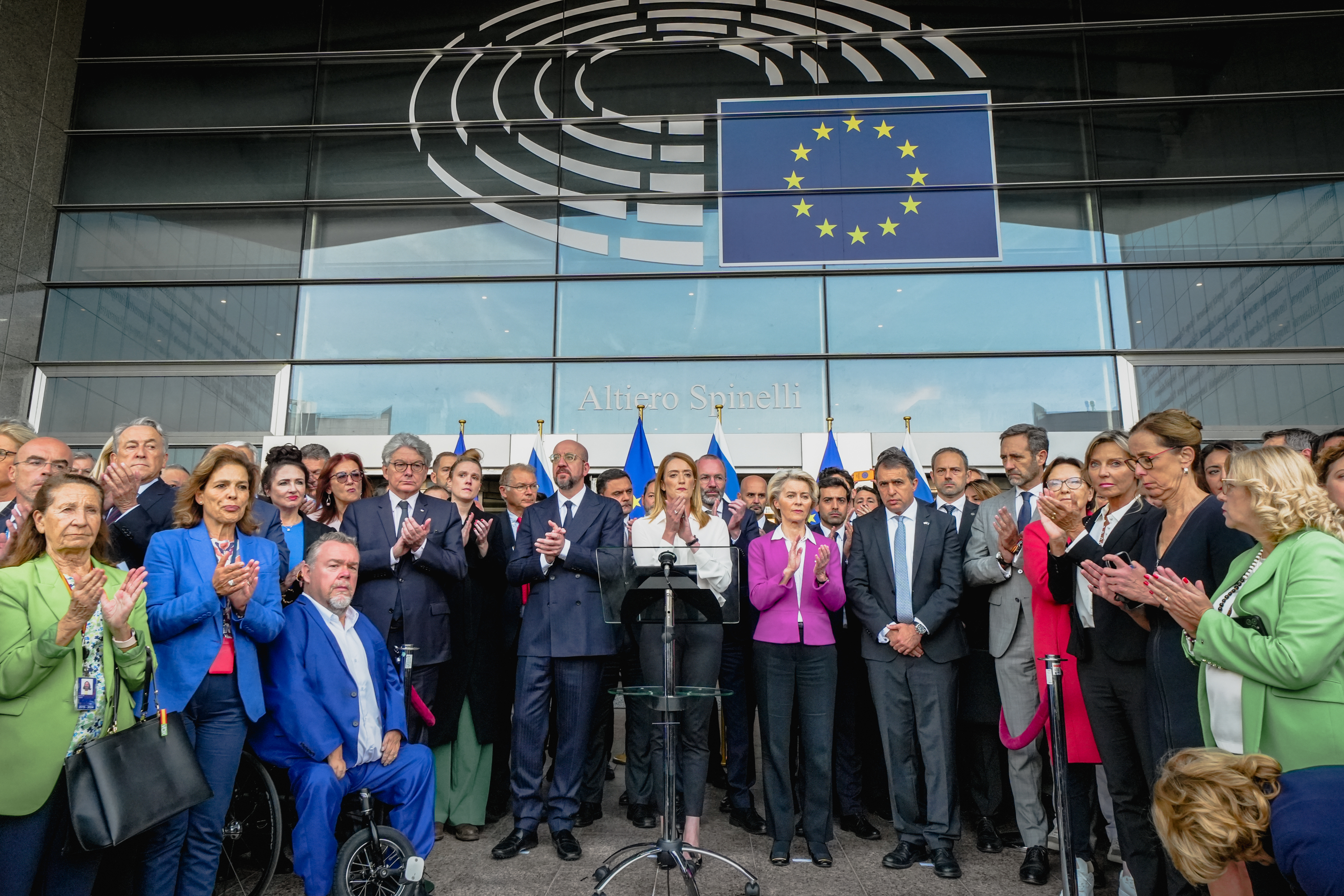
Gathering in support to Israel in front of the European Parliament in Brussels, 11 October 2023

EU's top diplomat Josep Borrell condemned the "barbaric and terrorist attack" by Hamas on Israel which started the Gaza war. On 10 October 2023, Borrell accused Israel of breaking international law by imposing a blockade of the Gaza Strip. On 3 January 2024, he condemned the comments of the Israeli ministers Itamar Ben-Gvir and Bezalel Smotrich, writing, "Forced displacements are strictly prohibited as a grave violation of [international humanitarian law] & words matter." In March 2024, Borrell said Israel's depriving food from Palestinians was a serious violation of international humanitarian law, and described the Flour massacre as "totally unacceptable carnage". German Chancellor Olaf Scholz confronted Borrell over his months-long criticism of Israel, saying Borrell did not speak for Germany.

On 15 May 2024, Borrell called on Israel to immediately halt its assault on Rafah, stating it was disrupting humanitarian aid and causing a humanitarian crisis, while also calling on Hamas to release all Israeli hostages. Borrell condemned the Tel al-Sultan massacre, saying that Israel's military actions needed to stop. According to a survey conducted by YouGov, as the War in Gaza continues, less than a fifth of respondents in six Western European countries have a favorable view of Israel, while 63 to 70 percent have an unfavorable view.

On 24 February 2025, the Vice-President of the European Commission Kaja Kallas met with Israeli Foreign Minister Gideon Sa'ar in Brussels for the first formal talks between Israel and the EU since the Gaza war. The European Commission rejected a request from Ireland and Spain to review the EU–Israel Association Agreement.

On 15 July 2025, Kaja Kallas and the foreign ministers of the EU member states decided not to take any action against Israel over alleged Israeli war crimes in the Gaza war and settler violence in the West Bank. The proposed sanctions against Israel included suspending the EU-Israel Association Agreement, suspending visa-free travel, or blocking imports from Israeli settlements. Israel considered the EU's decision not to impose sanctions on Israel as a diplomatic victory. Palestinian Foreign Minister Varsen Aghabekian criticized the decision, saying, "It’s shocking and disappointing, because everything is crystal clear. ... The whole world has been seeing what is happening in Gaza. The killing, the atrocities, the war crimes." Slovenian Foreign Minister Tanja Fajon posted on social media: "It is disappointing that there is no EU consensus to act on the June determination that Israel is violating Article 2 of the association agreement, concerning human rights."

Reactions followed the European Union’s inability to reach consensus on action against Israel in July 2025. In May 2026, the EU imposed sanctions on individuals and entities linked to Israeli settlers in the occupied West Bank following reports of violence against Palestinian civilians and property damage. EU officials said the measures were meant to address rising settler-related violence and its impact on stability in the region.

On the 19th of April, 2026, the Prime Minister of Spain, Pedro Sánchez, declared that Spain would officially suggest to the European Union to end its partnership agreement with Israel. Sánchez remarked that Israel “breaches international law” and thus “should not be a partner of the European Union.” Previously, the foreign ministers from Spain, Ireland, and Slovenia had charged Israel with breaching human rights and violating the EU partnership agreement due to the Israeli parliament's approval of the death penalty and the actions of settlers.

On 12 November 2026, the left alliance in the European Parliament submitted a citizens' petition calling for the full suspension of the EU–Israel trade agreement, citing Israel's human rights violations in Palestine. As a European Citizens' Initiative (ECI), the petition was required to collect one million signatures. It reached this threshold faster than any previous ECI, doing so within three months of its January launch. The European Left alliance behind the initiative organized a rally to mark the 1.1 million signatures collected, bringing together civil society, Palestinian-led movements, and citizens; the rally coincided with the petition's submission to the European Commission. Under ECI rules, the European Commission, the EU's executive arm, has six months to respond to the initiative.

=== 2026 Iran war ===
On 1 March 2026, following the death of Supreme Leader Ali Khamenei in a joint U.S.-Israeli military campaign, European Commission President Ursula von der Leyen called for a "credible transition" in Iran. She declared that the traditional "rules-based" international order is finished, urging the EU to adopt a more interest-driven, realistic foreign policy in response to global instability. Addressing the U.S.-Israeli strikes on Iran, she argued 'no tears should be shed' for the Iranian regime, despite noting security risks to Europe.

== EU membership for Israel ==
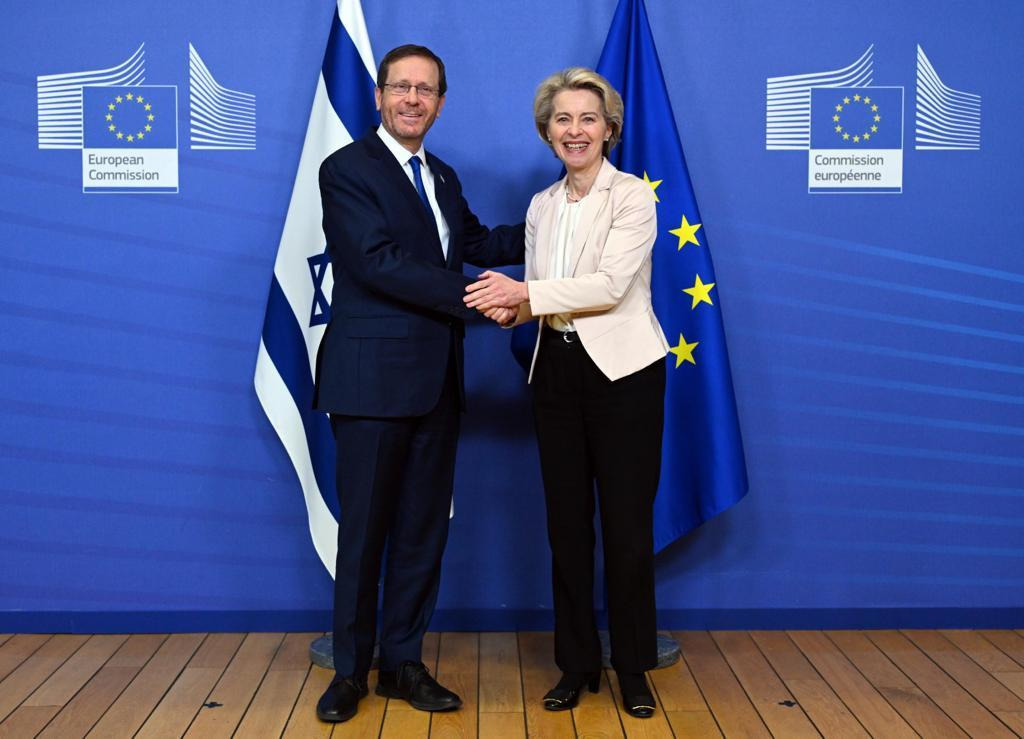
Ursula von der Leyen with Israeli President Isaac Herzog in Brussels, 2023

The Israeli government has hinted several times that an EU membership bid is a possibility, but the EU itself proposes instead the closest possible integration "just short of full membership." Faster advancement of such plans is somewhat hampered by the current instability in the Middle East and conflicts in the West Bank, Gaza Strip, and Lebanon. European public opinion of some of Israel's policies, especially those related to the aforementioned areas of conflict is, in general, poor.

The European Union's former High Representative for Common Foreign and Security Policy, Javier Solana, stated in 2009 that Israel had a very significant relationship with the EU, amounting almost to full cooperation through participation in the EU's programmes. Former Spanish foreign minister Miguel Ángel Moratinos spoke out for a "privileged partnership, offering all the benefits of EU membership, without participation in the institutions". On 11 January 2005, industry commissioner and vice president of the commission Günter Verheugen even suggested the possibility of a monetary union and common market with Israel. However, in 2025, the widespread devastation in Gaza and escalating settler violence in the West Bank have led to a noticeable shift in public opinion and political dynamics within the EU, leading to deliberations over whether to leverage the EU’s full economic influence to press for changes in Israeli policy.

=== Qualification ===
Although Israel is not geographically located in Europe, it is a member in many European transnational federations and frameworks, and takes part in many European sporting events and the Eurovision Song Contest.

An argument for the inclusion of Israel into the EU as a full member is that it has a partly "European" culture, as a significant number of Israelis are either Jews who migrated to Israel from Europe, or descendants of such people. Israel also has a GDP per capita similar to many richer European countries. Some claim that allowing Israel into the EU would create a precedent for other geographically non-European countries to apply for membership, but in fact this precedent already exists as Cyprus, which is already a member state, is geographically in Asia. Proponents of Israel's accession to the EU claim that Israel's situation is similar to that of Cyprus—a country outside of Europe geographically, but a part of Europe culturally and socially.

Moreover, like most western European countries, Israel is a member of the OECD and from an economic perspective matches the European Union extremely well, with essentially every significant economic indicator (GDP per capita, government deficit, public debt level, current account surplus, inflation level, etc.) closely matching the overall EU average. Israel is however not included among the nine countries that are part of the EU agenda for future enlargement of the European Union.

The European Council has not been asked to take a stance regarding whether or not Israel is a European state, but similar circumstances to Morocco (being geographically outside Europe and without exceptional features such as CoE membership) may preclude its inclusion as a full member into the EU as well.

=== Support ===
Until 2014, some politicians in both Israel and Europe expressed support for the idea of Israel joining the European Union, including:

- Former Israeli Foreign Minister, Silvan Shalom,
- Former Israeli Minister of Defense, Foreign Affairs, and Finance Avigdor Lieberman
- Former Italian Prime Minister, Silvio Berlusconi.
- Former Spanish Prime Minister José María Aznar in 2014 said Israel is needed by the European Union, in an address at the British House of Commons. Aznar said his report recommends that due to its Western culture and the benefits it brings the European Union, Israel should become a full member of the EU without pre-conditions.
- In 2012, former Bulgarian foreign minister Solomon Passy said Israel should more assertively seek to join NATO and the European Union.
- Two former Italian MEPs of the Transnational Radical Party, Marco Pannella and Marco Cappato, campaigned in favour of Israeli membership in 2006.

A 2004 opinion poll showed that 85% of Israelis would support an application for membership. Another survey in 2011 showed support for EU membership is 81%.

== Israel's bilateral relations with EU member states ==
- Austria
- Belgium
- Bulgaria
- Croatia
- Cyprus
- Czech Republic
- Denmark
- Estonia
- Finland
- France
- Germany
- Greece
- Hungary
- (Republic of Ireland) Ireland
- Italy
- Latvia
- Lithuania
- Luxembourg
- Malta
- Netherlands
- Poland
- Portugal
- Romania
- Slovakia
- Slovenia
- Spain
- Sweden

== See also ==
- Palestine–European Union relations
- Foreign relations of Israel
- History of the Jews in Europe
