= Netherlands–Palestine relations =

- Netherlands: Palestine

Netherlands–Palestine relations refers to the relationship between Netherlands and Palestine. Netherlands does not recognize Palestine.

Netherlands supports a two-state solution to the Israel-Palestine conflict. The Palestine mission in the Netherlands is located in The Hague.

== History ==
The Dutch representative office in the occupied Palestinian territories was opened in Jericho in 1994. It was moved to the city of Al-Bireh in 1996.

In November 2014, Bert Koenders, Foreign Minister of Netherlands, said that Netherlands would not recognize Palestine as it believed it would not help the peace process. Netherlands had provided funding for United Nations Relief and Works Agency for Palestine Refugees (UNRWA).

The Party for Freedom, under the leadership of Geert Wilders, emerged victorious in the legislative elections of November 2023, securing approximately 23 percent of the total votes cast. In 2010, Wilders stated that the two-state solution had already been put into action, arguing that there has been a Palestinian state in Jordan since 1946. He also maintained that it is Jordan's responsibility to welcome and accept all Palestinian refugees who wish to reside there willingly. He called for Jordan to be renamed Palestine. Wilders reiterated his position after his election win.

Mark Rutte, Prime Minister of Netherlands, invited Mahmoud Abbas, the President of Palestine, to discuss the Gaza war. Dutch human rights organization sued their government for supplying Israel with military parts during the conflict alleging the parts were used for human rights violations. Half the population of Netherlands believe Palestinians live under apartheid in Israel according to a poll. Dutch parliament struggled to pass a motion to review aid to Palestinians.

== See also ==
- Foreign relations of Netherlands
- Foreign relations of Palestine
