= Finland–Israel relations =

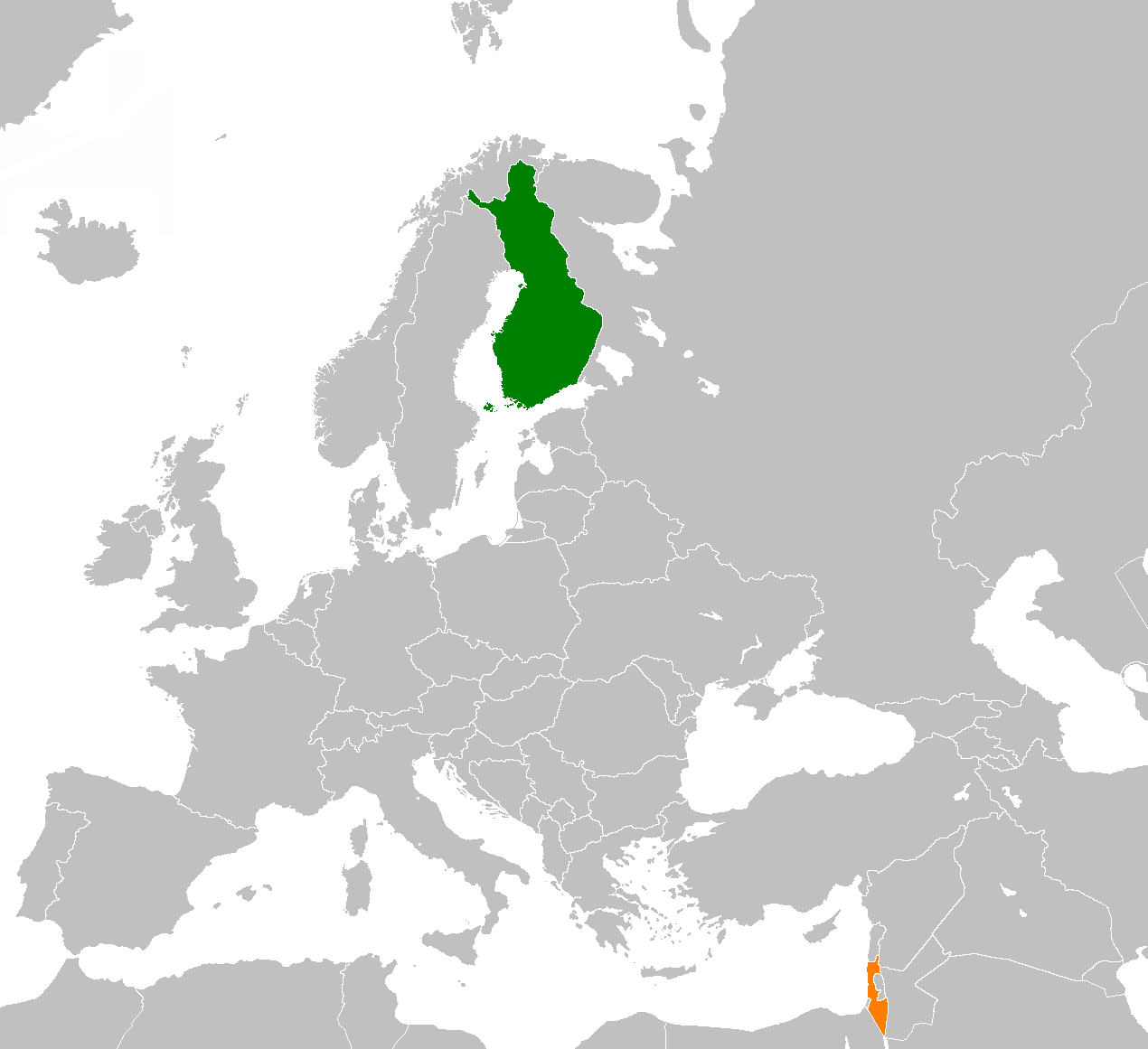
- Finland: Israel

Diplomatic mission
- Embassy of Finland, Tel Aviv: Embassy of Israel, Helsinki

Finland–Israel relations are diplomatic, commercial and cultural ties between Finland and Israel. Finland maintains an embassy in Tel Aviv and Israel maintains an embassy in Helsinki. Both countries are full members of the Union for the Mediterranean.

== History ==
Finnish President Paasikivi announced de facto recognition of Israel on 11 June 1948, a month after Israel's declaration of independence. Finland officially recognized the State of Israel on 18 March 1949 and diplomatic relations were established on 14 November 1950. Finland opened its embassy in Tel Aviv in 1952 and Israel opened its embassy in Helsinki in 1956.

The first Finnish diplomatic representative to Israel was Toivo Kala, who presented his letter of accreditation to Foreign Minister Moshe Sharett. Sharett told Kala that he admired Finland's readiness to defend its rights and its efforts to rebuild after the war.

Today, Finland and Israel have strong cultural and scientific ties, and some 10,000 Finns visit Israel every year.

In May 2025, Finland's Foreign Ministry summoned the Israeli ambassador to Finland for questioning after Israeli forces fired "warning shots" towards a diplomat delegation while visiting Jenin in the West Bank.

== Economic relations ==
In 2005, Finnish exports to Israel totaled 155.24 million euros and imports from Israel to Finland totaled 95.96 million euros. Israel imports Finnish machinery, telecommunications equipment, wood, paper products and chemical industry products. Israel's leading exports to Finland are telecommunications equipment and machinery, and Israeli fruits and vegetables.

In 2004, a joint Finland-Israel Technology (FIT) cooperation program was created for research and development projects in the field of ICT. The Office of the Chief Scientist in Israel and Tekes, the Finnish Funding Agency for Research and Innovation, allocated five million euros each for the funding of projects.

The Finland Israel Trade association serves as an intermediary between Finnish and Israeli companies in order to create new business contacts. It helps to organize business missions to Israel and hosts business missions from Israel.

In April 2019, Finland and Israel embarked on a project to sponsor joint programs in digital health and healthcare technology. The Israel Innovation Authority and the Helsinki Business Hub led the initiative.

Finland - Israel trade in millions USD-$
	Israel imports Finland exports	Finland imports Israel exports	Total trade value
2023	318.5	80.1	398.6
2022	350.5	79.7	430.2
2021	425.5	56	481.5
2020	356.5	47.8	404.3
2019	273.1	50.4	323.5
2018	284.9	57.1	342
2017	262.1	65.6	327.7
2016	260.4	85.8	346.2
2015	273.7	86.2	359.9
2014	285.3	123.5	408.8
2013	285.1	121.9	407
2012	271	145.9	416.9
2011	293.7	151	444.7
2010	359.6	141.2	500.8
2009	332.6	121.1	453.7
2008	370.2	169.1	539.3
2007	339.5	155.3	494.8
2006	289.5	125.9	415.4
2005	263.4	121.3	384.7
2004	315	129.9	444.9
2003	242.1	89.1	331.2
2002	263.5	83.3	346.8

== Cultural ties ==
In 2006, an exhibition on the history of Finland's Jews from the 1830s to the 1970s opened at Beth Hatefutsoth in Tel Aviv.

== Military ties ==
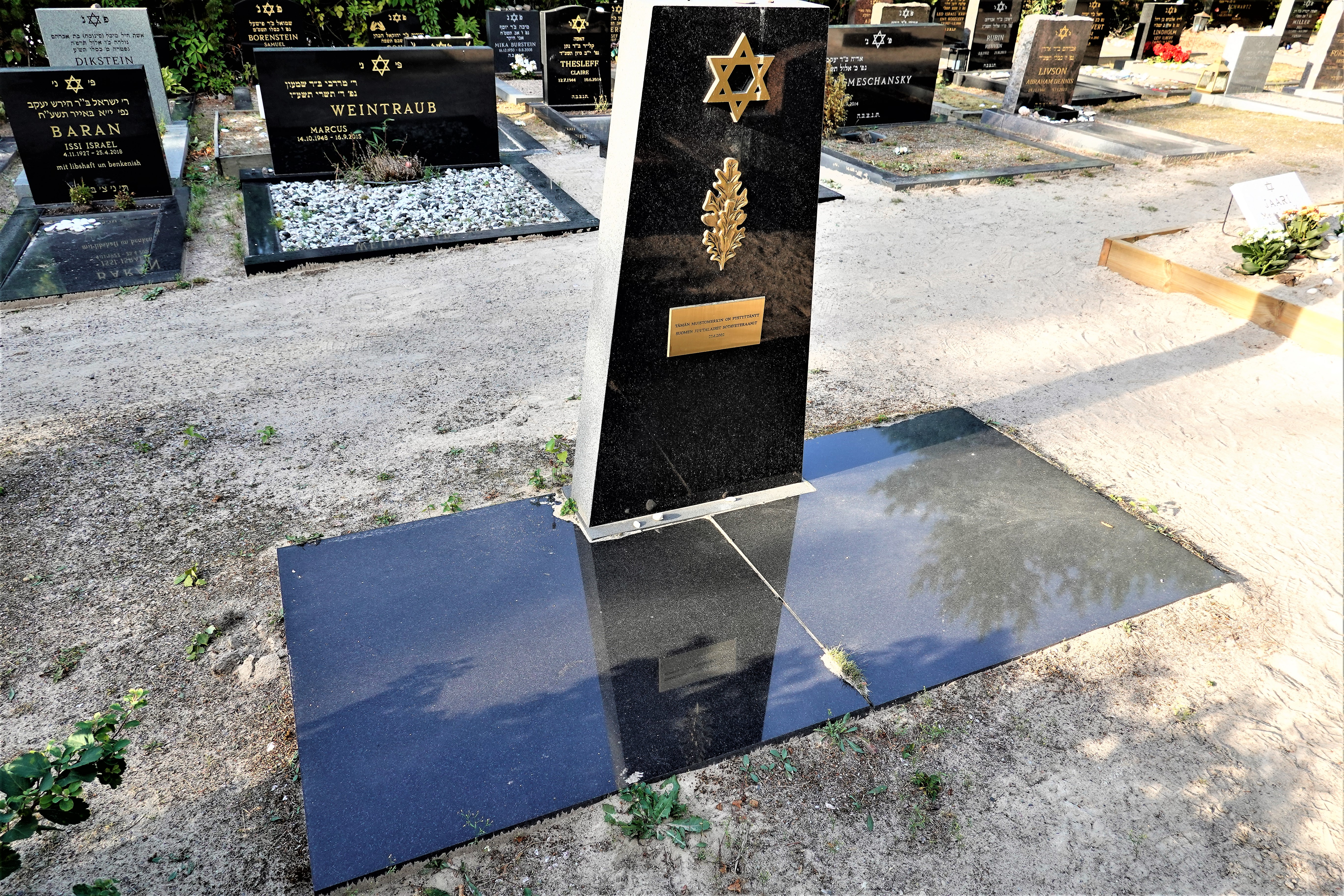
"This monument was erected for Finnish Jewish war veterans on 27 April 2002"

IMI Galil is said to have been partially based on Finnish Rk 62 assault rifle, and indeed the machinery used to manufacture the first Galils as well as receivers for the early samples were provided by Valmet. Tampella (through fully owned subsidiary Salgad) and Israeli Solel Boneh founded Soltam Systems in 1950 and started to license build Finnish designed artillery pieces and grenade launchers in Israel. It was seen as a win-win for two small and relatively poor countries with nascent defence. After two decades, the two countries' profiles had grown apart. Amid negative publicity and dwindling domestic sales for Tampella, the ties between Salgad and Soltam were severed 15 August 1974.

The Finnish Defence Force (FDF) has two radios- LV141 and LV241- which have been contract-built by Israeli electrical supply company Tadiran for Danish Terma A/S. Spike anti-tank missiles were bought from German Rheinmetall, which subcontracted Rafael Advanced Defense Systems. Rafael was also involved in FDF's LITENING AT targeting pod purchase. Mastsystem International, current Cobham Mast Systems have been granted an export license to export some telescopic masts from Finland to Israel. The process to receive export licenses to Israel has been criticized as politically unpredictable, enough for customers to lose interest. For example, a Mastsystem International spokesperson noted in October 2010 that they were denied permit from the end of 2008 to summer 2009. In the same newspaper article a researcher noted that in 2008 Finland had also denied some export permits to Sri Lanka, Brazil and Russia.

In April 2012 the FDF ordered for the Army 24 million euros worth of Orbiter II UAVs from Aeronautics Defense Systems. Their previous Swiss UAV RUAG Ranger's design was also done in Israel. In January 2014, the FDF ordered $47 million worth of multi-spectral camouflage technology from Fibrotex Technologies. In 2023, Finland chose the Israeli David's Sling as their future air defense system, to be deployed in the late 2020s.

== Resident diplomatic missions ==
- Finland has an embassy in Tel Aviv.
- Israel has an embassy in Helsinki.
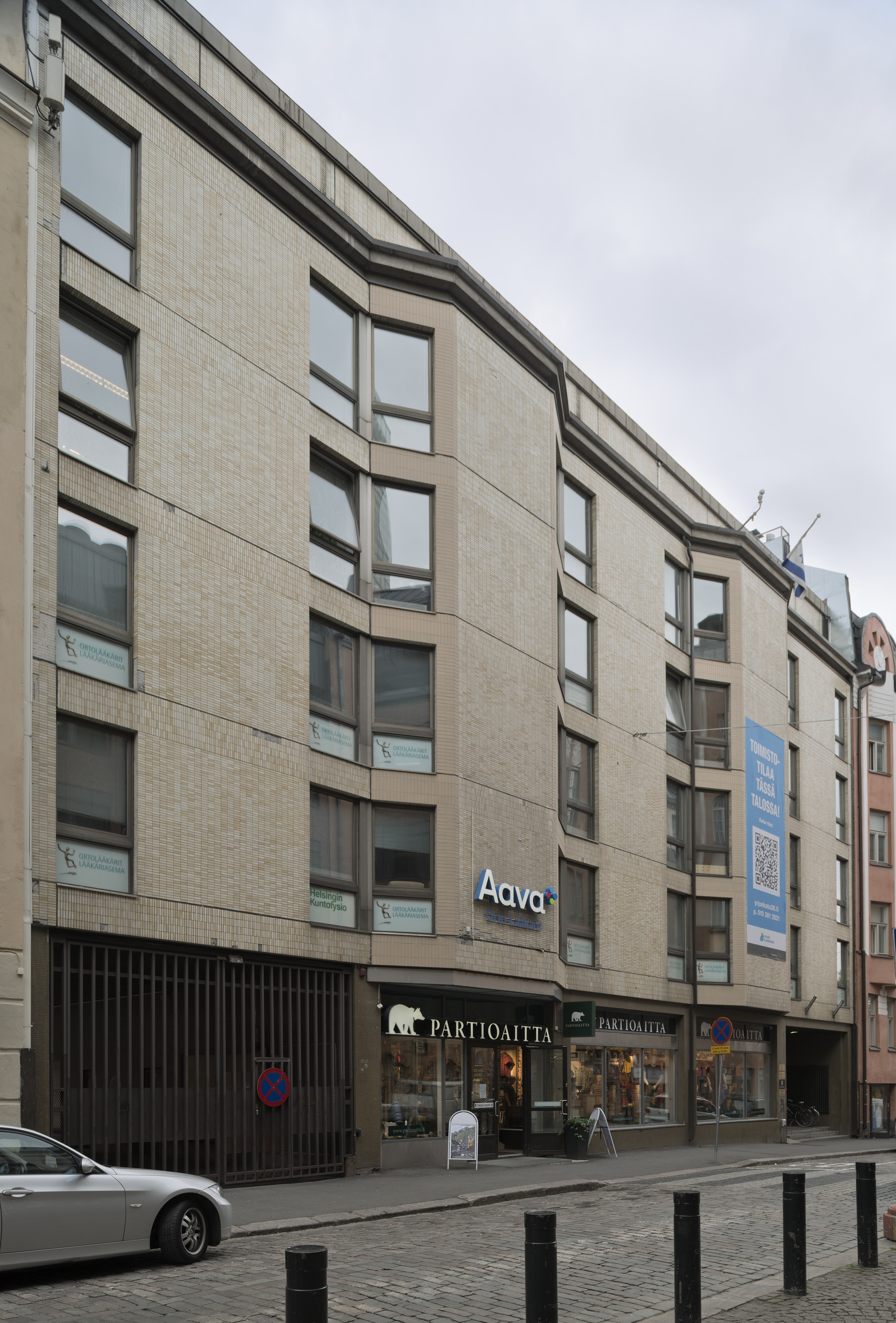
Embassy of Israel in Helsinki

== See also ==
- Foreign relations of Finland
- Foreign relations of Israel
- Israel-EU relations
- Finland–Palestine relations
- History of the Jews in Finland
- Yad HaShmona
- SV Estelle
