= Palestine–Portugal relations =

- Palestine: Portugal

Palestine–Portugal relations (Arabic: العلاقات البرتغالية الفلسطينية; Portuguese: Relações luso-palestinianas) are the bilateral relations between the State of Palestine and the Portuguese Republic.

== History ==
In 1999, Portugal decided to open a representative office in Ramallah. On 18 October of the same year, António Jorge Jacob Carvalho was named Portugal's representative to the Palestinian National Authority.

In 2010, Portugal granted embassy status to the Palestinian representation in the country.

On 12 December 2014, the Portuguese Parliament passed a resolution requesting the government to recognize the State of Palestine. The event was attended by ambassadors of Arab countries.

The most recent representative of Lisbon in Palestine was Fernando Demee de Brito from 21 June 2019.

On 27 October 2023, Portugal was one of 121 countries to vote in favor of a General Assembly resolution calling for an immediate ceasefire to the Gaza war.

In July 2025, Prime Minister of Portugal, Luís Montenegro announced that the government will consult the president Marcelo Rebelo de Sousa of recognizing Palestine as a state in September stating, "The government decided to promote consultations with the president and the political parties represented in parliament with a view to consider the recognition of the Palestinian state in a process that could be concluded at the UN General Assembly in September."

On 21 September 2025, Portugal officially recognized the state of Palestine, alongside Australia, Canada and the United Kingdom.

== See also ==
- Foreign relations of Portugal
- Foreign relations of Palestine
