= Palestine–Slovenia relations =

- Palestine: Slovenia

On 30 May 2024, Slovenia announced its recognition of the State of Palestine, following a statement by Prime Minister Robert Golob confirming his government's approval. On 4 June 2024, the Slovenian Parliament ratified the decision. The following day, the two countries formally established diplomatic relations.

On 1 October 2007, Slovenia established a representative office to the Palestinian Authority in Ramallah, prior to assuming the presidency of the Council of the European Union. In June 2017, both countries agreed to establish educational cooperation.

In January 2018, during Palestinian President Mahmoud Abbas's visit to Brussels, Belgium, the European Union foreign ministers were urged to extend recognition to the State of Palestine as a response to the United States' recognition of Jerusalem as Israel's capital. At that time, Foreign Minister Karl Erjavec stated that the embassy relocation to Jerusalem represented "a move away from the two-state solution" and called for "greater support for Palestine." Earlier in the month, Erjavec had also noted that Slovenia's recognition of the State of Palestine "would enhance Palestine’s position in the Middle East peace negotiations."

On 7 August 2025, Slovenia enacted a ban on products originating from Israeli settlements in the occupied territories. This decision was welcomed by the Palestinian Ministry of Foreign Affairs, which regarded it as a genuine demonstration of Slovenia's commitment to international humanitarian law.

== See also ==
- Foreign relations of Slovenia
- Foreign relations of Palestine
