= Palestine–Slovakia relations =

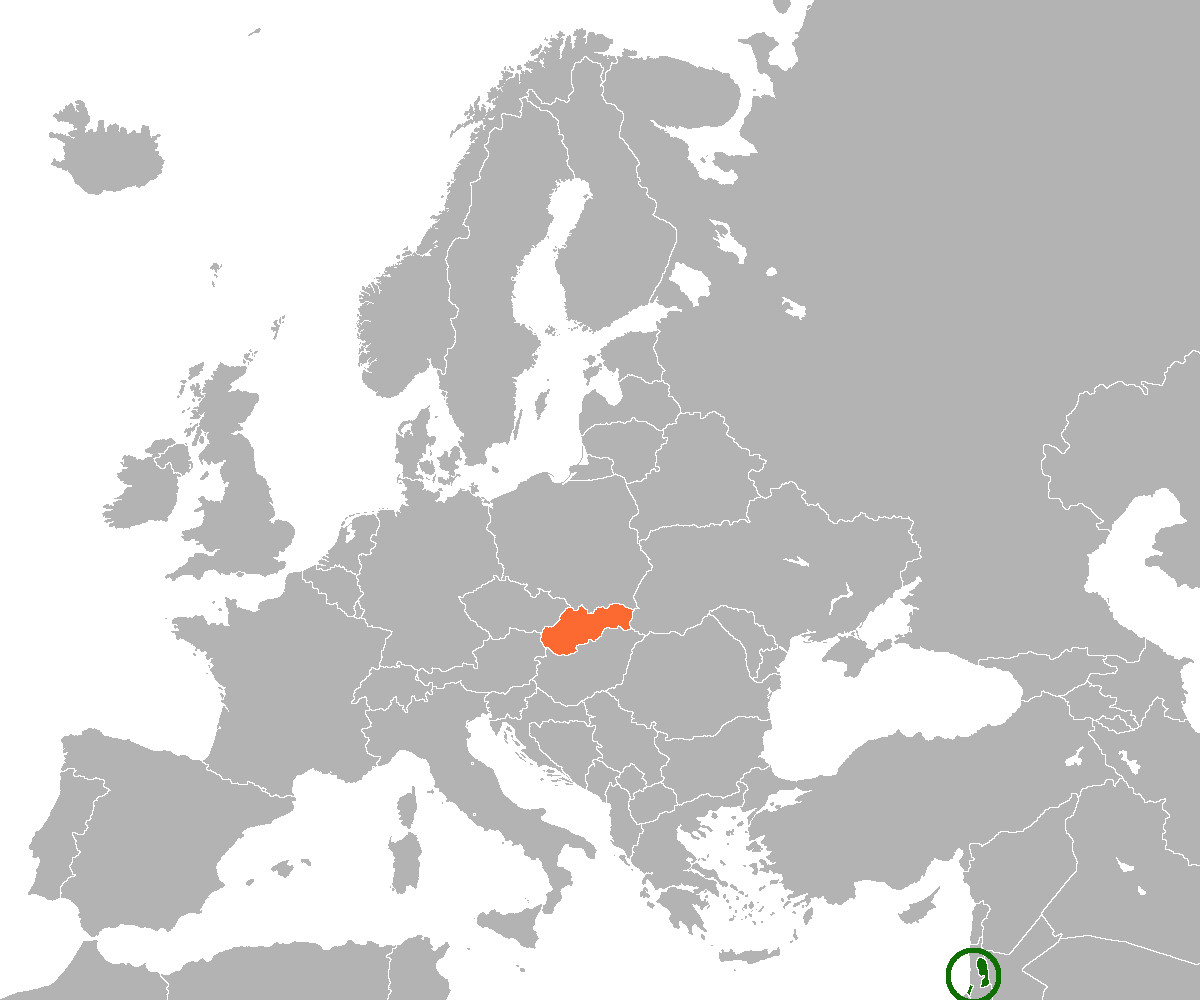

- Palestine: Slovakia

Palestine–Slovakia relations are bilateral relations between Palestine and Slovakia. The Czechoslovak Socialist Republic recognized Palestinian statehood on 18 November 1988. The two countries established diplomatic relations on 1 January 1993. The State of Palestine has an embassy in Bratislava.

== See also ==
- Foreign relations of Slovakia
- Foreign relations of Palestine
