= Luxembourg–Palestine relations =

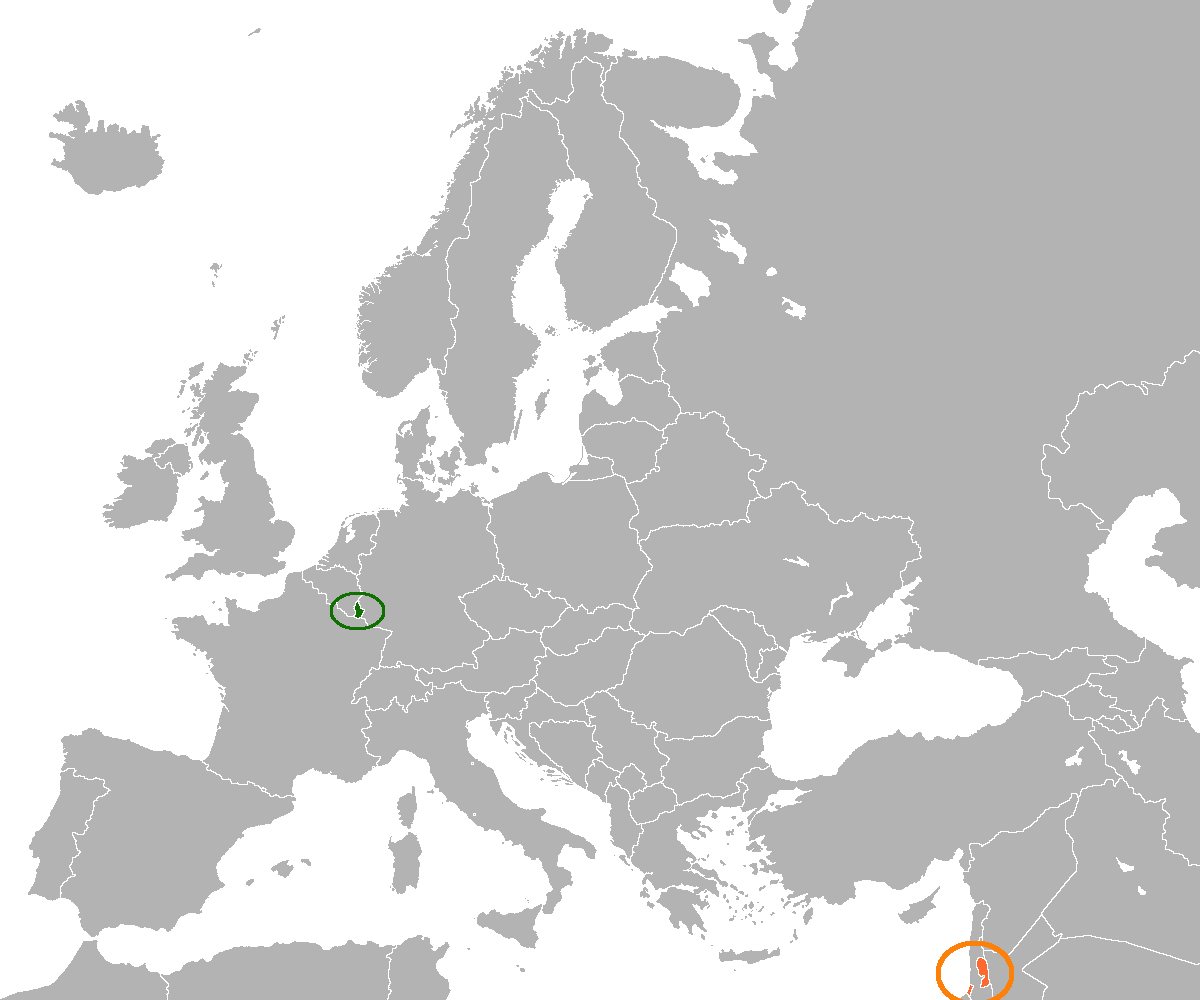

- Luxembourg: Palestine

Luxembourg–Palestine relations are the bilateral relations between the Grand Duchy of Luxembourg and the State of Palestine. Relations between the two countries are friendly.

President Mahmoud Abbas visited Luxembourg on 15 February 2015, meeting with Grand Duke Henri and senior officials. Luxembourg contributes to the support of UNRWA and condemns Israeli settlements.

Luxembourg officially recognized the State of Palestine on 22 September 2025. Even prior to that, it has voted in favor of resolutions on Palestine on many occasions. However, Foreign Minister Jean Asselborn stated his intention to recognize Palestine once a bigger European power takes the lead and has urged EU member states do so. In June 2020, Luxembourg called for the recognition of Palestine if Israel annexed parts of the West Bank.

In August 2020, Luxembourg's Foreign Minister criticized the UAE and Israel's agreement to normalize relations, describing it as an abandonment of the Palestinians by the UAE. He added that peace in the Middle East cannot be achieved without resolving the Israeli–Palestinian conflict.

On 27 October 2023, Luxembourg was one of 121 countries to vote in favor of a General Assembly resolution calling for an immediate ceasefire to the Gaza war.

On 15 September 2025, in response to a parliamentary inquiry, Luxembourgish Prime Minister Luc Frieden and Foreign Minister Xavier Bettel stated that Luxembourg aimed to recognize Palestine as a state at the Eightieth session of the United Nations General Assembly. Luxembourg formally recognised the State of Palestine as an independent and sovereign state on 22 September 2025.

== See also ==
- Foreign relations of Luxembourg
- Foreign relations of Palestine
