= Arab League–European Union relations =

- Arab League: European Union

Arab League and European Union relations matured during the EU's evolution into a more political project than one focused on economic outcomes.

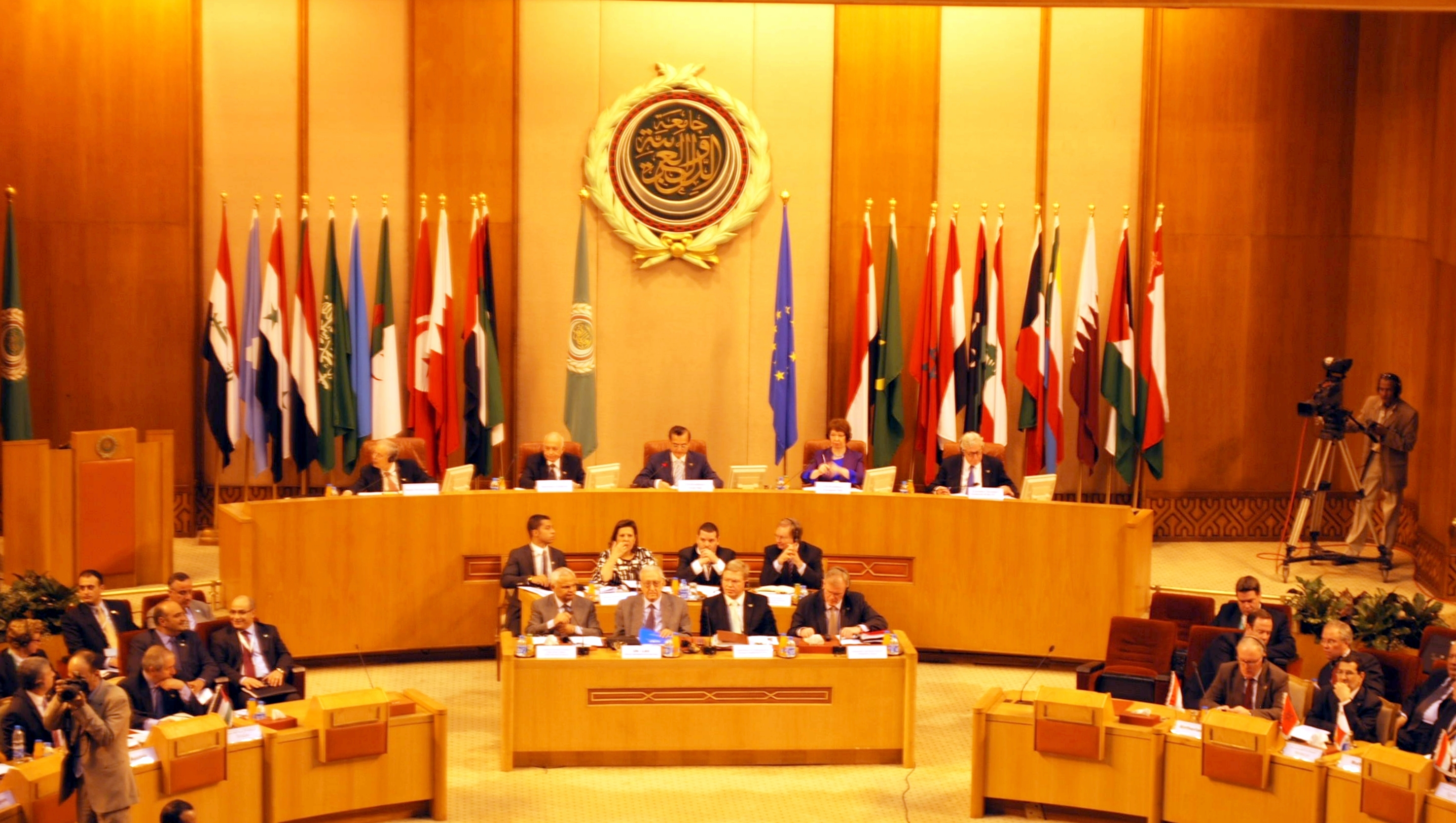
Meeting of the European Union and Arab League foreign ministers in Cairo (2012)

Organizational relations started in 2007, when the Arab League adopted a policy of reaching out to other regional organizations and significant economic partners, particularly the EU, ASEAN, China, India, Japan and South America.

== History ==
Although the Arab League was created decades before the creation of the European Union, the bloc has played an important role in its formation and development. The League's conception, which was initially supported by the United Kingdom, aimed to increase nationalist sentiment in the Middle East against the Ottoman Empire during World War I. The European states then suffered from what was called the independent movements that raged the Arab world. This occurred especially in French Colonized Algeria, Syria, Lebanon and Morocco, and British Colonized Iraq, Egypt, Palestine and the Kingdom of Trans-Jordan. Pan-Arabism became most widespread under Egyptian President Gamal Abdel Nasser during the Suez Canal Crisis. After Nasser's death, tensions between the European Union and the Arab League eased. In 1973, Arab-European relations focused on the exchange of petroleum products for political support.

At the 19th summit of the Arab League, Javier Solana attended. He gave the EU's full support to the Arab League's Peace Initiative of 2002. At the summit, he addressed the Arab Leaders: "Once again we find ourselves together, the European Union and the Arab League, once again we have an opportunity to re-affirm our joint commitment to the values of civilisation that we share, more than ever Europeans and Arabs have to face common challenges, I am confident that we will find new ways to improve our cooperation."

=== Malta Communique ===
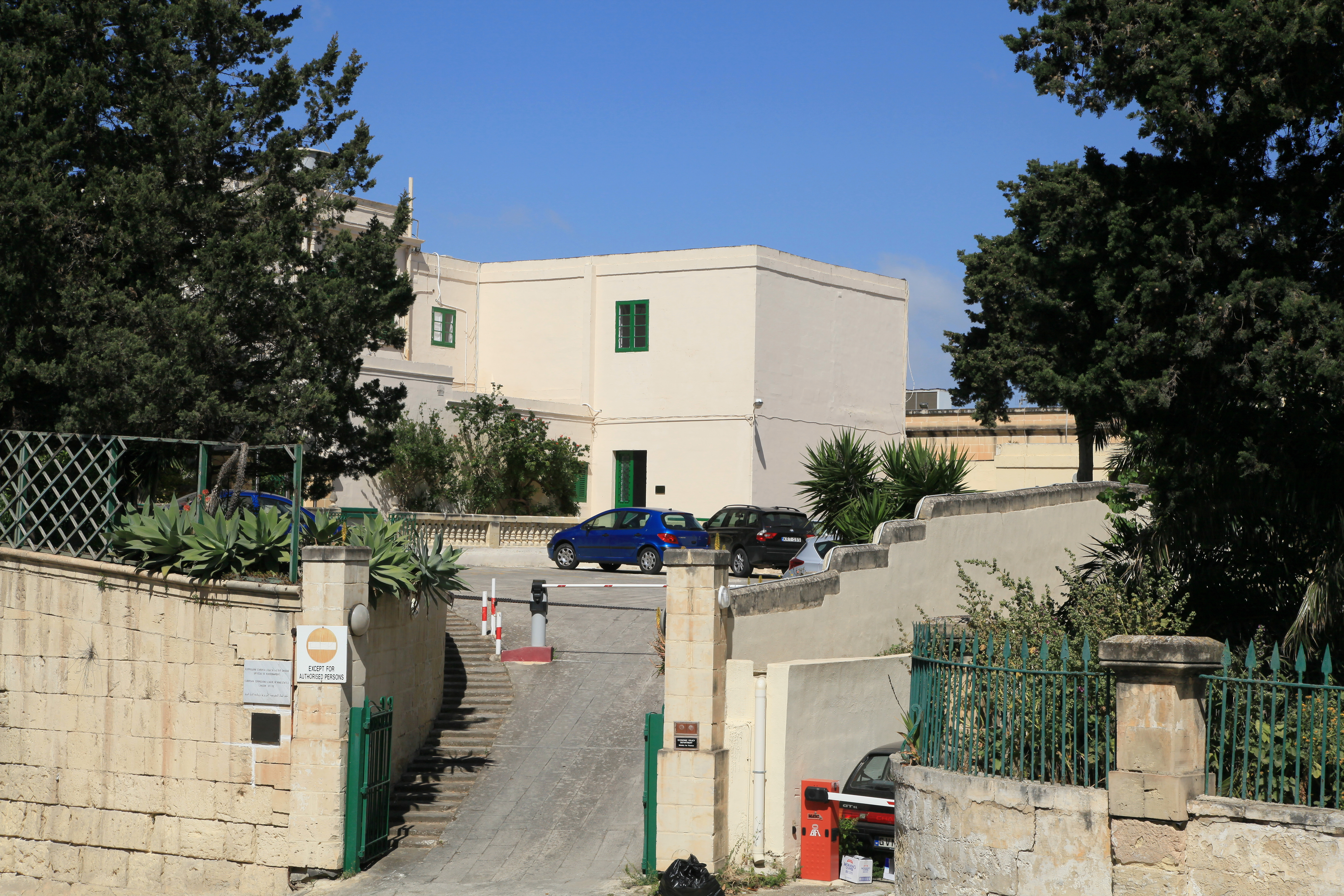
European Commission – League of Arab States Liaison Office in Floriana, Malta.

In 2008, an Arab League-EU Summit was held in Malta, in the presence of 49 foreign ministers and representatives from 49 countries, 27 European states, and 22 Arab states. The summit concluded with a final resolution, known as the Malta Communique, which discussed mostly political issues in the Middle East, including tensions in Iraq, Lebanon, and the Gaza Strip. The summit was the result of the "Malta Initiative", launched in 2005 by Maltese Minister of Foreign Affairs Michael Frendo to bring together the European Union and the League of Arab States at Foreign Minister level for the first time. This summit, often referred to as "Malta I", was followed by "Malta II" held in Cairo, Egypt, which gathered foreign ministers from both the European Union and the Arab League and resulted in the issue of the Cairo Declaration on 13 November 2012.

== See also ==
- Foreign relations of the Arab League
- Foreign relations of the European Union
