= Foreign relations of Palestine =

The foreign relations of Palestine have been conducted since the establishment of the Palestine Liberation Organization (PLO) in 1964. Since the Oslo Accords, it seeks to obtain universal recognition for the State of Palestine on the 1967 borders, with East Jerusalem as its capital. As of 23 September 2025, 157 of the 193 United Nations (UN) member states officially recognize the State of Palestine (Israel is recognized by 159 excluding Israel itself).

In November 1988, the Palestinian National Council declared the independence of the State of Palestine, and in 1994, the Palestinian National Authority (PNA) was established following the Oslo Accords. The PLO Executive Committee performs the functions of the government of the State of Palestine.

After 2011, the PLO's diplomatic effort focused on the Palestine 194 campaign, which aims to gain membership for the State of Palestine in the United Nations. In November 2012, the State of Palestine was accepted as a non-member observer state of the UN General Assembly with the passing of United Nations General Assembly resolution 67/19.

== Background ==
The Palestine Liberation Organization was created in 1964 as a paramilitary organization and has sought to conduct foreign relations with states and international organisations since that time. Initially, the PLO established relations with Arab and communist countries. In 1969 the PLO became a member of the Organisation of Islamic Cooperation. In October 1974, the Arab League designated the PLO as the "sole legitimate representative of the Palestinian people". The new status of the PLO was recognised by all Arab League states except Jordan (Jordan recognised that status of the PLO at a later stage). On 22 November 1974, United Nations General Assembly Resolution 3236 recognised the right of the Palestinian people to self-determination, national independence, and sovereignty in Palestine. It also recognised the PLO as the representative of the Palestinian people to the United Nations. By Resolution 3237 on the same date, the PLO was granted non-State observer status at the United Nations. In September 1976, the PLO became a non-state member of the Arab League, and in the same year became a member of the Non-Aligned Movement.

On 15 November 1988, in support of the First Intifada, the PLO declared the establishment of the State of Palestine, which was widely recognized by many foreign governments, although often statements made were of an equivocal nature – at times referring to the PLO or the State of Palestine or one acting on behalf of the other, or by the generic "Palestine". Many countries and organisations "upgraded" representation from the PLO to the new State, though in practice the same PLO offices, personnel and contacts continued to be used. In February 1989 at the United Nations Security Council, the PLO representative claimed recognition from 94 states. Since then, additional states have publicly extended recognition.

The PNA was established by the PLO in 1994 following the Oslo Accords and the Israeli-Palestinian Interim Agreement. The Israeli government transferred certain powers and responsibilities of self-government to the PNA, which are in effect in parts of the West Bank, and used to be effective in the Gaza Strip before its takeover by Hamas. The Foreign Affairs Minister of the Palestinian National Authority, who since July 2007 has been Riyad Al-Maliki, is responsible for the foreign relations of the PNA. States maintain official relations with the PNA through offices in the Palestinian territories, and the representation of the PNA abroad is accomplished by the missions of the PLO, who represents it there.

Both the PLO (representing itself, the State of Palestine, or the PNA) and the PNA now maintain an extensive network of diplomatic relations, and participate in multiple international organisations with status of member state, observer, associate, or affiliate. The designation "Palestine", adopted in 1988 by the UN for the PLO, is currently also used as reference to the PNA and the State of Palestine by states and international organisations, in many cases regardless of the level of recognition and relations they have with any of these entities.

== Diplomatic relations ==
List of countries which maintain diplomatic relations with the State of Palestine by date:

#	Country	Date
1	Czech Republic	9 November 1988
2	Sudan	15 November 1988
3	Mauritania	16 November 1988
4	Vietnam	19 November 1988
5	China	20 November 1988
6	Hungary	23 November 1988
7	Bulgaria	8 December 1988
8	Algeria	16 December 1988
9	Maldives	1988
10	Zimbabwe	1988
11	Saudi Arabia	1 January 1989
12	Bahrain	3 January 1989
13	Kuwait	3 January 1989
14	United Arab Emirates	5 January 1989
15	Senegal	6 January 1989
16	Jordan	7 January 1989
17	Qatar	7 January 1989
18	Malaysia	12 January 1989
19	Romania	14 January 1989
20	Niger	18 January 1989
21	Pakistan	18 January 1989
22	Oman	23 January 1989
23	Morocco	31 January 1989
24	Mozambique	31 January 1989
25	Cuba	3 February 1989
26	Sri Lanka	6 February 1989
27	Uganda	15 February 1989
28	Ghana	17 February 1989
29	North Korea	3 March 1989
30	Serbia	5 April 1989
31	Republic of the Congo	6 April 1989
32	Ethiopia	6 April 1989
33	Gabon	7 April 1989
34	Poland	11 April 1989
35	Laos	15 May 1989
36	Bangladesh	24 July 1989
37	Chad	12 August 1989
38	Philippines	4 September 1989
39	Nicaragua	24 September 1989
40	Mongolia	13 October 1989
41	Vanuatu	17 October 1989
42	Indonesia	19 October 1989
43	Albania	26 October 1989
44	Egypt	October 1989
45	Guinea-Bissau	13 November 1989
46	India	16 November 1989
47	Benin	1989
48	Burkina Faso	1989
49	Cape Verde	1989
50	Gambia	1989
51	Iran	1989
52	Iraq	1989
53	Mali	1989
54	Mauritius	1989
55	Nigeria	1989
56	São Tomé and Príncipe	1989
57	Sierra Leone	1989
58	Togo	1989
59	Russia	10 January 1990
60	Namibia	21 March 1990
61	Comoros	1990
62	Seychelles	1990
63	Tanzania	1990
64	Zambia	20 February 1991
65	Cambodia	17 December 1991
66	Turkey	19 December 1991
67	Syria	22 January 1992
68	Angola	28 February 1992
69	Tajikistan	6 March 1992
70	Kazakhstan	6 April 1992
71	Azerbaijan	15 April 1992
72	Turkmenistan	17 April 1992
73	Georgia	25 April 1992
74	Bosnia and Herzegovina	30 October 1992
75	Slovakia	1 January 1993
76	Brunei	24 May 1994
77	Uzbekistan	25 September 1994
78	Papua New Guinea	13 January 1995
79	South Africa	15 February 1995
80	Tunisia	19 April 1995
81	Kyrgyzstan	12 September 1995
82	Malawi	23 October 1998
83	Ukraine	2 November 2001
84	Belarus	4 February 2003
85	Timor-Leste	1 March 2004
86	Paraguay	26 March 2005
87	Montenegro	1 August 2006
88	Kenya	26 January 2008
89	Costa Rica	5 February 2008
90	Equatorial Guinea	11 July 2008
91	Venezuela	27 April 2009
92	Dominican Republic	15 July 2009
93	Eswatini	3 November 2010
94	Peru	12 November 2010
95	Brazil	1 December 2010
96	Ecuador	24 December 2010
97	Chile	7 January 2011
98	Uruguay	29 March 2011
99	Lebanon	17 August 2011
100	Iceland	15 December 2011
101	Ivory Coast	24 January 2012
102	Thailand	1 August 2012
103	Cyprus	9 February 2013
104	Guyana	21 February 2013
105	El Salvador	9 May 2013
106	Honduras	10 May 2013
107	Grenada	27 September 2013
108	Haiti	27 September 2013
109	Bolivia	15 November 2013
110	Belize	9 July 2014
111	Sweden	30 October 2014
112	South Sudan	24 January 2015
113	Argentina	5 March 2015
—	Holy See	13 May 2015
114	Saint Lucia	14 September 2015
115	Saint Vincent and the Grenadines	22 September 2016
116	Botswana	8 March 2017
117	Dominica	18 March 2018
118	Colombia	6 August 2018
119	Saint Kitts and Nevis	29 July 2019
120	Lesotho	30 September 2021
121	Slovenia	5 June 2024
122	Barbados	11 June 2024
123	Antigua and Barbuda	14 June 2024
124	Spain	16 September 2024
125	Trinidad and Tobago	22 September 2024
126	Armenia	27 September 2024
127	Ireland	29 September 2024
128	Mexico	19 March 2025
129	Norway	24 April 2025
130	Luxembourg	22 September 2025
131	Malta	22 September 2025
132	United Kingdom	5 January 2026
133	San Marino	23 February 2026
134	France	25 March 2026
135	Afghanistan	Unknown
136	Djibouti	Unknown
137	Guinea	Unknown
138	Libya	Unknown
139	Somalia	Unknown
140	Yemen	Unknown

== Bilateral relations ==
The Palestine Liberation Organization maintains a network of missions and embassies, and represents the Palestinian National Authority abroad. Most of the 157 states that have recognised the State of Palestine have elevated the Palestinian representation in their country to the status of embassy. A number of other states have granted some form of diplomatic status to a PLO delegation, falling short of full diplomatic recognition. In some cases, as a matter of courtesy, these delegations and missions have been granted diplomatic privileges, and are often referred to as "embassies" with their heads as "ambassadors".

In the United States, an unofficial PLO information office was established in New York in 1964 and run by Sadat Hassan, who served as Permanent Representative of Yemen to the United Nations. The Palestine Information Office was then registered with the Justice Department as a foreign agent and operated until 1968, when it was closed. The PLO was designated a terrorist organization by the United States in 1987, but in 1988 a presidential waiver was issued which permitted contact with the organization. A PLO office was reopened in 1989 as the Palestine Affairs Center. The PLO Mission office, in Washington, D.C., was opened in 1994, and represented the PLO in the United States. On 20 July 2010, the United States Department of State agreed to upgrade the status of the PLO Mission in the United States to "General Delegation of the PLO".

== Participation in international organisations ==
The State of Palestine is represented in various international organisations as member, associate or observer.

International Organisation	Status	Representation	Application date	Admission date
Membership
Organisation of Islamic Cooperation (Note: Including its subordinated organizations of Islamic Development Bank (joined in 1977, three years after its establishment in 1974) and Islamic Educational Scientific and Cultural Organization (one of the founders in 1982).)	member	State of Palestine		1969 (Note: The State of Palestine succeeded the seat of the Palestine Liberation Organization following the 1988 Palestinian Declaration of Independence.)
INTERPOL		State of Palestine		2017
ICC		State of Palestine		2015
Non-Aligned Movement	member	Palestine		1976
Arab League (Note: Including its subordinated organizations of Arab Fund for Economic and Social Development, Arab Monetary Fund and Arab Satellite Communications Organization. The PLO's Palestinian National Council is one of the founders of the Arab Inter-parliamentary Union in 1974.)	member	State of Palestine		1976
United Nations Economic and Social Commission for Western Asia	member	Palestine Liberation Organization (as in the UNGA)		1977
Euro-Mediterranean Parliamentary Assembly	member	Palestinian National Council (PLO)		2003
International Coordinating Committee of National Human Rights Institutions (Note: Including its regional subgroup Asia Pacific Forum of National Human Rights Institutions (APF).)	member	Palestinian Independent Commission for Human Rights (PNA) (Note: Established by 1993 decree of the President of the State of Palestine and the Chairman of the Palestine Liberation Organization and organized according to 1997 PNA's Palestinian Legislative Council law stipulating that "The Commission shall submit its reports to the President of the National Authority, and to the Palestinian Legislative Council.")		2004
International Federation of Red Cross and Red Crescent Societies and International Red Cross and Red Crescent Movement	member	Palestine Red Crescent Society (PLO)		2006
Parliamentary Assembly of the Mediterranean	member	Palestinian National Council (PLO)		2006
Union for the Mediterranean	member	Palestinian National Authority		2008
Inter-Parliamentary Union	member	Palestinian National Council (PLO) (Note: Palestine Liberation Organization delegation has been IPU observer since the 117th session of the IPU Governing Council in 1975. At various sessions in 1996, 1997 and 1998 it was decided that the Palestine National Council does not fulfill the conditions for membership laid down in Article 3 of the IPU Statutes, but in 1998 the rights of the observer delegation of Palestine were strengthened. Following the approval of the amendment to Article 3 in 2008 the PNC was accepted as IPU member.)	1995	2008
Asian Parliamentary Assembly	member	Palestinian Legislative Council (PNA)		
Group of 77	member	Palestine		
International Trade Union Confederation	member	Palestine General Federation of Trade Unions		
Airports Council International	member	Palestinian Civil Aviation Authority (PNA)		
Alliance for Financial Inclusion	member	Palestinian Monetary Authority (PNA)		2010
UNESCO	member	State of Palestine	1989	2011 (Note: The PLO participated in UNESCO as observer since 1974.:"The Palestinians have had observer status at UNESCO since 1974." In 1989 an application was submitted for the State of Palestine to become full member. In 2011 UNESCO accepted the application.)
IBAN	member	Palestinian Monetary Authority (PNA)		2012
Non-member status
United Nations (Note: For the purposes of United Nations Regional Groups arrangement, the Palestine Liberation Organization participates in the Asia group since 2 April 1986.)	observer state	State of Palestine		1974 (Note: Since 1974 the Palestine Liberation Organization has the status of UN non-state observer entity. Since 1988 its designation in the UN is "Palestine". Since 2012 the UN observer mission of the PLO is changed into UN observer mission of the State of Palestine, whose government is the Executive Committee of the Palestine Liberation Organization.)
World Health Organization	observer	Palestine Liberation Organization (as in the UNGA)		1998
International Telecommunication Union	observer	Palestine Liberation Organization (as in the UNGA)		1998
World Tourism Organization	special observer	Palestine Liberation Organization (as in the UNGA)		1999
International Organization for Standardization	correspondent (Note: Representation for "Occupied Palestinian Territory" equivalent to that of a state; assigned the code "ps")	Palestine Standards Institution (PNA)		2001 (Note: The PSI became a subscriber member of ISO in 2001 and a correspondent member in 2004. It is still not a full member.)
World Intellectual Property Organization	observer	Palestine Liberation Organization (as in the UNGA)	2005	2005
Universal Postal Union	special observer	Palestinian National Authority		2008
Energy Charter Conference	observer	Palestinian National Authority		2008
International Electrotechnical Commission	affiliate participant	Palestine Standards Institution (PNA)		2009
Parliamentary Assembly of the Council of Europe	partner for democracy	Palestinian National Council (PLO)	2010	2011
Association of Caribbean States (ACS)	observer			2017

=== Arab League ===
In 1964, the first summit of the League of Arab States, held in Cairo in January, resulted in a mandate for the creation of a Palestinian entity. Subsequently, in May, the Palestine Liberation Organization was established during a meeting of the Palestinian National Congress in Arab-controlled Jerusalem. The organisation's establishment was formally approved at the Arab League's second summit, held in Alexandria in October. The PLO was granted full membership in 1976. Its seat was assumed by the State of Palestine following the declaration of independence in 1988.

A meeting between the Palestinian Authority and ministers from Arab countries, including Jordan, Egypt, Saudi Arabia, Qatar, and the United Arab Emirates, was scheduled for May 2025 in Ramallah. However, Israel blocked the meeting, claiming it incited the establishment of a Palestinian state. In response, Arab foreign ministers condemned Israel's decision. Travel to Palestine from Jordan, whether by land or air, requires Israeli permission.

=== Organisation of Islamic Cooperation ===
The PLO was accorded full membership in the Organisation of the Islamic Conference (OIC; now named Organisation of Islamic Cooperation) in 1969; it attended the founding conference, held in Rabat in September 1969, as an observer. Its seat was assumed by the State of Palestine following the declaration of independence in 1988. It is also a member of the Islamic Development Bank, an international financial institution for member states of the OIC.

=== Status at the United Nations ===
Countries that have recognized the State of Palestine Countries that have not recognized the State of Palestine

The Palestine National Council (PNC) sent formal notification to the U.N. Secretary-General regarding the establishment of the Palestine Liberation Organization (PLO) in May 1964. The following year in October, some Arab states requested that a PLO delegation be allowed to attend meetings of the Special Political Committee, and it was decided that they could present a statement, without implying recognition. PLO participation in the discussions of the Committee took place under the agenda item of the United Nations Relief and Works Agency for Palestine Refugees in the Near East (UNRWA) from 1963 to 1973.

The Palestine Liberation Organization was granted observer status at the United Nations General Assembly in 1974 through General Assembly Resolution 3237. In the UNGA's regional groupings, the PLO gained full membership in the Group of Asian states on 2 April 1986. Acknowledging the proclamation of the State of Palestine, the UN re-designated this observer to be referred to as "Palestine" in 1988 (General Assembly Resolution 43/177) and affirmed "the need to enable the Palestinian people to exercise their sovereignty over their territory occupied since 1967". In July 1998, the General Assembly adopted a new Resolution (52/250) conferring upon Palestine additional rights and privileges, including the right to participate in the general debate held at the start of each session of the General Assembly, the right of reply, the right to co-sponsor resolutions and the right to raise points of order on Palestinian and Middle East issues. By this resolution, "seating for Palestine shall be arranged immediately after non-member States and before the other observers." This Resolution was adopted by a vote of 124 in favour, 4 against (Israel, Marshall Islands, Federated States of Micronesia, United States) and 10 abstentions.

Since 2011, Palestinian diplomacy has been centred around the Palestine 194 campaign, which aims to gain membership for the State of Palestine in the United Nations at its 66th Session in September 2011. It seeks to effectively gain collective recognition for a Palestinian state based on the borders prior to the Six-Day War, with East Jerusalem as its capital. In September 2012, the Palestine Liberation Organization submitted a draft resolution according non-member observer state status to Palestine, which the General Assembly approved on 29 November 2012. The change in status was described by The Independent as "de facto recognition of the sovereign State of Palestine".

The vote was a historic benchmark for the sovereign State of Palestine and its citizens, whilst it was a diplomatic setback for Israel and the United States. Status as an observer state in the UN will allow the State of Palestine to join treaties and specialised UN agencies, such as the International Civil Aviation Organisation, the Law of the Seas Treaty and the International Criminal Court. It shall permit Palestine to claim legal rights over its territorial waters and air space as a sovereign state recognized by the UN. It shall also provide the citizens of Palestine with the right to sue for control of their territory in the International Court of Justice and with the legal right to bring war-crimes charges, mainly those relating to the unlawful Israeli occupation of the State of Palestine, against Israel in the International Criminal Court.

After Palestine was granted UN observer status, the UN authorised the PLO to title its representative office to the UN as 'The Permanent Observer Mission of the State of Palestine to the United Nations', and Palestine re-titled its name accordingly on postal stamps, official documents and passports, whilst it has instructed its diplomats to officially represent 'The State of Palestine', as opposed to the 'Palestine National Authority'. Additionally, on 17 December 2012, UN Chief of Protocol Yeocheol Yoon decided that "the designation of 'State of Palestine' shall be used by the Secretariat in all official United Nations documents", thus recognizing the PLO-proclaimed State of Palestine as being sovereign over the territories of Palestine and its citizens under international law.

=== International Criminal Court ===
On 13 June 2014, the State of Palestine became a party to the International Criminal Court, based in The Hague; the State of Palestine acceded to the Rome Statute on 2 January 2015.

Before the United Nations General Assembly voting in September 2012, the Palestinian Authority had tried to become a party to the Rome Statute and therefore recognize the jurisdiction of the International Criminal Court (ICC) in 2009 and again in April 2012. According to The Jerusalem Post, "had the ICC accepted the PA's recognition of its jurisdiction, it would have also tacitly accepted its statehood."

=== International Committee of the Red Cross and the Red Crescent (ICRC) ===
In June 2006, a decision by the 29th International Conference of the Red Cross and the Red Crescent admitted the Palestine Red Crescent Society as a full member of the International Federation of Red Cross and Red Crescent Societies.

=== Geneva Conventions ===
The State of Palestine has been a full member of the Geneva Conventions since 2 April 2014.

In 1989, just one year after the proclamation of the State of Palestine, the Palestine Liberation Organization had tried to accede to the Geneva Conventions back in 1989, but Switzerland, as the depositary state, had stated that because the question of Palestinian statehood had not been settled within the international community, it was incapable of recognising Palestine as a "power" that could accede to the Conventions.

=== FIFA, IOC (International Olympic Committee) and IPC (International Paralympic Committee) ===
The State of Palestine is a full member of the International Olympic Committee, of the International Paralympic Committee, and of FIFA.

=== International Agency for Atomic Energy (IAEA) ===
On 28 September 2023, a majority of the members of the International Atomic Energy Agency (IAEA) approved a proposal for the State of Palestine to be recognized, with that name, as an observer state to the Agency. (Note: Palestine Liberation Organization originally granted observer status by the IAEA on 23 September 1976. Designation changed to "Palestine" on 29 September 1989, and "State of Palestine" on 28 September 2023.)

=== World Health Organization (WHO) ===
The PLO currently holds observer status at the World Health Organization (WHO). It had applied for full membership status as far back as 1989, when the United States, which provided one-quarter of the WHO's funding at the time, informed the WHO that its funding would be withheld if Palestine was admitted as a member state. Yasser Arafat described the U.S. statement as "blackmail". The PLO was asked to withdraw its application by the WHO director general. The WHO subsequently voted to postpone consideration of the application and no decision on the application has been made yet. John Quigley writes that Palestine's efforts to gain membership in several international organisations connected to the United Nations was frustrated by U.S. threats to withhold funding from any organisation that admitted Palestine. On 31 October 2011, following the admission of Palestine to UNESCO, the Minister of Health Fathi Abu Moghli announced that the PNA would then seek membership at the WHO; however, following reports that that would lead to the defunding of the entire organization by the United States – as the US had done to UNESCO after it admitted Palestine –, the Palestinian government announced that they would not be seeking membership at WHO at the time. As of 2023, the WHO still refers to the territories claimed by the State of Palestine – the West Bank and Gaza – as "the Occupied Palestinian Territory".

=== World Trade Organization (WTO) ===
In 2022, the State of Palestine was allowed to participate, as an observer state and under the name "Palestine", of the World Trade Organization's twelfth Ministerial Conference, held in Geneva, Switzerland.

== International treaties and conventions ==
The Palestine Liberation Organization, representing the Palestinian National Authority, participates in trade liberalisation:

Treaty or convention	Signature	Ratification
Customs Union with Israel (Note: Israel has free trade agreements with the EU, EFTA, Turkey, USA, Canada and Mexico. The PNA participates in the free trade agreement between the United States and Israel.)		1994 (Note: Established following the Oslo Accords and the Paris protocol.)
Free Trade Agreement with the European Union	1997-02-24	1997-07-01
Free Trade Agreement with the European Free Trade Association	1998-11-30	1999-07-01
Bilateral Investment Treaty with Egypt	1998-04-28	1999-06-19
Free Trade Agreement with Turkey	2004-07-20	2005-06-01
Greater Arab Free Trade Area of the Council of Arab Economic Unity		
Free trade agreement with Mercosur (Argentina, Brazil, Paraguay, Uruguay and Venezuela)	2011-12-21	
Free trade agreement with Jordan	2012-10-07	

The Palestine Liberation Organization and the Palestinian National Authority are jointly (Note: Palestine was accorded membership in ESCWA pursuant to ECOSOC Resolution 2089 (LXIII) dated 22 July 1977. Full powers for the signature of the Agreements were issued by the leaders of the PLO and the PNA.) accepted as party to the international agreements in the Arab Mashreq:

Treaty or convention	Signature	Ratification
On roads	2001-05-10	2006-11-28
On railways	2003-04-14	2006-11-28
On maritime transport	—	2005-05-09

== Bibliography ==
- Fowler, Michael; Bunck, Julie Marie (1995). Law, Power, and the Sovereign State: The Evolution and Application of the Concept of Sovereignty. Penn State Press. ISBN 0-271-01471-7.
- Hirschberger, Bernd (2021). External Communication in Social Media During Asymmetric Conflicts A Theoretical Model and Empirical Case Study of the Conflict in Israel and Palestine. Bielefeld: transcript Verlag. ISBN 978-3-8394-5509-8.
- Quigley, John (1990). Palestine and Israel: A Challenge to Justice. Duke University Press. ISBN 0-8223-1023-6.
- Takkenberg, Alex (1998). The Status of Palestinian Refugees in International Law (Illustrated ed.). Oxford University Press. ISBN 0-19-826590-5.
- Talmon, Stefan (1998). Recognition of Governments in International Law: With Particular Reference to Governments in Exile (Illustrated ed.). Oxford University Press. ISBN 0-19-826573-5.
