= Salah Abdel-Shafi =

Palestinian economist and diplomat (born 1962)

H.E. Salah Abdel-Shafi
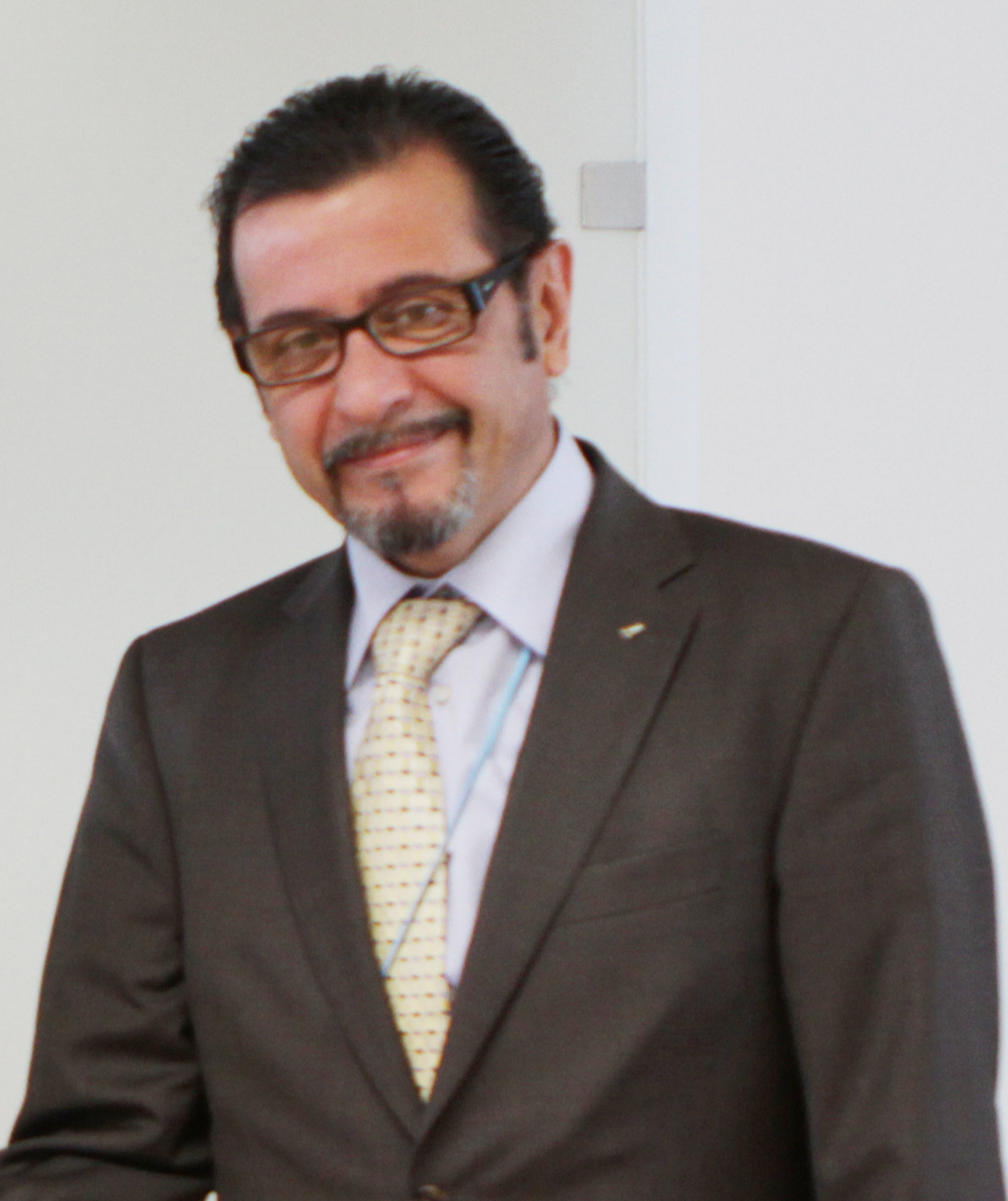

Permanent Observer to the United Nations Office at Vienna Palestinian ambassador to Austria
- Incumbent
- Assumed office September 2013
- President: Mahmoud Abbas

Palestinian ambassador to Germany
- In office 2010–2013
- President: Mahmoud Abbas

Palestinian ambassador to Sweden
- In office 2006–2010
- President: Mahmoud Abbas
- Preceded by: Hael Al-Fahoum
- Succeeded by: Khouloud Daibes

Personal details
- Born: 29 August 1962 (age 63) Gaza City, Palestine
- Education: Berlin School of Economics

Salah Abdel-Shafi (Arabic: صلاح عبد الشافي; born 29 August 1962) is a Palestinian economist, and the current Palestinian ambassador to Austria and permanent observer to the United Nations in Vienna, holding the position since September 2013. From 2010 to 2013, he served as the Palestinian ambassador to Germany, he was the first Palestinian representative to Germany to officially hold ambassadorial status. From 2006 to 2010, he was the Palestinian ambassador to Sweden. Abdel Shafi formerly served as General Director of the Gaza Community Mental Health Programme, a consultant, and adviser to the World Bank.

== Education & career ==
He studied economics at Berlin School of Economics. His father was the Palestinian political and community leader Haidar Abdel-Shafi.

On October 1, 2013, he was appointed ambassador of the State of Palestine to Austria, and on October 24, 2013, he presented his credentials to the President of Austria.

On October 17, 2014, Abdel Shafi presented his credentials as non-resident ambassador to the President of Slovenia. He is the first Palestinian ambassador since Slovenia established a Palestinian diplomatic representation within the country.

On October 15, 2021, he presented his credentials to Croatian Minister of Foreign Affairs and European Affairs Gordan Grlić-Radman as non-resident ambassador of the State of Palestine to Croatia.
