= Hala Fariz =

Hala Fariz هالة فريز

Palestinian Ambassador to Sweden
- In office September 2011 – 2021

Personal details
- Born: Hala Husni Fariz Odeh; 25 October 1955 (age 70)

Hala Husni Fariz Odeh, also known as Hala Fariz, (Arabic: هاله حسني فريز عودة; born 25 October 1955) is a Palestinian diplomat.

She presented her credentials to the Minister of Foreign Affairs in September 2011 as the Ambassador of the Palestinian National Authority.

In 2014, Sweden recognized the State of Palestine. On 30 January 2015, Fariz presented her credentials as Ambassador of the State of Palestine to the King of Sweden.

Her assignments in Sweden ended in 2021.

== See also ==
- Embassy of the State of Palestine in Sweden
