= Palestine–Saudi Arabia relations =

- Palestine: Saudi Arabia

Diplomatic mission
- Embassy of Palestine, Riyadh: Embassy of Saudi Arabia, Amman

Envoy
- Ambassador Bassem Al-Agha: Ambassador Nayef Al Sudairi

Palestine–Saudi Arabia relations refers to the bilateral relationship between the Kingdom of Saudi Arabia and the State of Palestine.

Although the State of Palestine has an embassy in Riyadh, Saudi Arabia does not have one in Ramallah. On August 12, 2023, Ambassador Nayef al-Sudairi, the kingdom’s current ambassador to Jordan, was named as non-resident envoy to Palestine and consul general in Jerusalem at the Palestinian embassy in Amman. Israeli officials said, the new Saudi ambassador can meet Palestinian officials but will have no fixed presence. Both countries are members or observers of the Arab League, the Organization of Islamic Cooperation, and the United Nations. In recent years, there have been rumors indicating behind-the-scenes diplomatic and intelligence cooperation between Saudi Arabia and Israel, in pursuit of mutual goals against Iran. However, Saudi Arabia supports the establishment of a Palestinian state on the basis of pre-1967 borders, with East Jerusalem as its capital.

== History ==
While Saudi Arabia tends to be a sympathizer of Palestine after the 1948 Arab–Israeli War, Saudi Arabia has distanced itself from the conflict and emphasizes in a friendlier approach. Nonetheless, at the reign of King Faisal, a liberal ruler in Saudi history and firmly pro-Palestinian, Saudi Arabia had set up closer ties with Palestine and supportive of the Palestinian cause to a level after the 1973 Arab–Israeli War, he withdrew Saudi oil from market, causing the 1973 oil crisis. The new oil revenue also allowed Faisal to greatly increase the aid and subsidies begun following the 1967 Six-Day War to Egypt, Syria, and the Palestine Liberation Organization. However, he was assassinated two years later, and the relationship once warm under Faisal, became soured for the second time.

During the 1991 Gulf War, the Palestinian leadership of Yasser Arafat openly supported Saddam Hussein's Iraq invading Kuwait. As Kuwait is Saudi Arabia's cultural and political ally, this prompted tensions between Saudi Arabia and Palestine and continue to have a significant legacy on it, since it fueled the eventual distrust of Saudi Arabia against Palestine. Since then, relations between Saudi Arabia and Palestine have been largely up-and-down, with Saudi Arabia accused of helping Israel, declining aids from Saudi Arabia and increasing Iranian aids to Palestine, while Iran is Saudi Arabia's arch-foe from 1979. On August 12, 2023, the Saudi government appointed Nayef al-Sudairi as the first non-resident Saudi Ambassador to the State of Palestine. Sudairi delivered his credentials to Palestinian Foreign Minister Riyad Malki in Ramallah on September 26.

== Modern opinions ==
While Saudis tend to maintain a strongly sympathizing view on Palestinians, especially among the older generations, some Palestinians view Saudi Arabia unfavorably, due to distrust of Saudi officials and rumors that Saudi Arabia may normalize relations with Israel without concessions to the Palestinians.

Amongst the House of Saud, there is a divide over the potential embrace of Israel. The current King of Saudi Arabia, Salman, has expressed his support for an independent Palestinian state based on pre-1967 borders. A prominent Saudi prince, Turki bin Faisal Al Saud, known to be close to King Salman, expressed his support for an independent state based on pre-1967 borders. At a Bahrain security summit that was remotely attended by Israel’s foreign minister, al-Faisal accused Israel of depicting itself as a “small, existentially threatened country, surrounded by bloodthirsty killers who want to eradicate her from existence”. The Crown Prince of Saudi Arabia, Mohammed bin Salman, reportedly stated in 2018 that “For the past 40 years, the Palestinian leadership has missed opportunities again and again, and rejected all the offers it was given” and "Palestinians should accept peace or 'shut up and stop complaining'", which prompted protests from Palestinians over his remark. However, Saudi King Salman once again attempted to confirm their support to Palestine in a meeting with Palestinian President Mahmoud Abbas. Since then, Saudi Crown Prince Mohammed bin Salman has taken a pro-Palestinian attitude, declaring at an Arab League conference in 2023 that "the Palestinian issue has been and continues to be the central issue for Arab countries, and it is at the top of the kingdom's priorities." Bandar bin Sultan Al Saud, was interviewed by Al Arabiya in 2020. During the interview, he lashed out at Palestinian leadership for its failures, and stated, “The Palestinian cause is a just cause but its advocates are failures, and the Israeli cause is unjust but its advocates have proven to be successful.” He noted that Saudi Arabia has always backed Palestine despite its leadership's repeated mistakes.

== See also ==
- Embassy of the State of Palestine in Saudi Arabia
- Foreign relations of Palestine
- Foreign relations of Saudi Arabia
