= Martyrdom in Palestinian society =

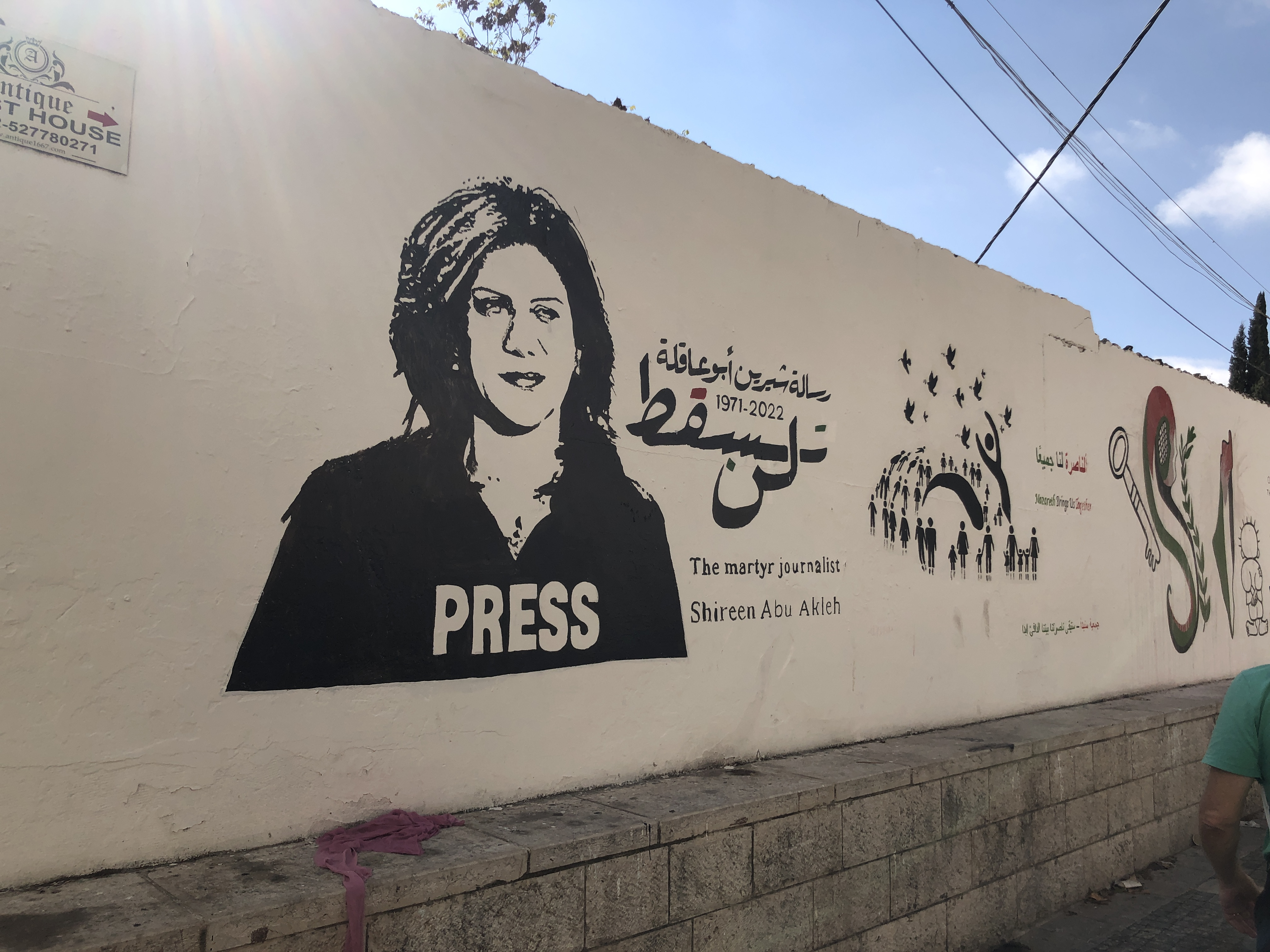
Graffiti mural in Nazareth, Israel, depicting the Palestinian-American journalist Shireen Abu Akleh, who was killed by the Israeli military during a raid in Jenin on 11 May 2022. Abu Akleh was a Palestinian Christian, and has been hailed as a martyr in Palestinian society since her death.

In the Israeli–Palestinian conflict, the term shahid (Arabic: شهيد, lit. 'martyr') is used by Palestinians to refer to any killed Palestinian civilian or fighter, regardless of their religious affiliation, and regardless of whether or not their killing was the result of a targeted attack. Initially, the concept of self-sacrifice for a cause was popular among the Palestinian fedayeen, who were actively engaged in a military struggle against Israel and the Israeli occupation, with the concept peaking in the 1960s. Gradually, the concept adopted an Islamic meaning and became more widespread after the First Intifada in 1987. Palestinian conceptions of martyrdom and participation in political violence are attributed to religious and nationalist ideologies, perceived collective victimhood, and prolonged conflict.

Various Palestinian militant groups, including Hamas, Palestinian Islamic Jihad (PIJ), and other Islamist groups, have been influenced by and have helped disseminate the culture of martyrdom. They perceive martyrdom as the ultimate sacrifice for their cause and often cite it as a moral justification for engaging in what they called “martyrdom operations”, such as suicide attacks. Prior to and throughout the Oslo Accords, the majority of the Palestinian public did not support Hamas and PIJ’s suicide operations, and Palestinians hoped that the Oslo Accords would result in agreements with Israel that would address the Palestinian call for political independence. After the derailment of the Oslo Accords, the failure of the peace process, and the beginning of the Second Intifada, popular interest in these martyrdom operations grew. During this period, martyrdom evolved beyond its religious connotations, becoming an ideal for the resistance identity of secular Palestinian nationalists.

Palestinian political parties and non-governmental organizations promote commemorative narratives; nationalistic factions have used it as a political tool to influence public opinion. Education, visual media, community events, ceremonies, leaflets, and posters throughout the Palestinian territories contribute to positive cultural conceptions of martyrdom, portraying killed Palestinians as part of the struggle against Israel's military occupation.

== Historical and etymological background ==
In Palestine, the term shahid for "martyr" is used to mean any person who was killed by an aggressor, whether targeted or untargeted, and regardless of religion. According to The New York Times, this reflects a prevalent view in the community that every Palestinian death is part of a resistance against Israeli occupation. Researchers Neil Whitehead and Nasser Abufarha state that the shahid concept of a victim who falls at the hands of an oppressor became a symbol of the First Intifada and was congruent with the political dynamics of the time when efforts were made to lobby international support for Palestinians’ pursuit for independence.

The term "Fida’i", meaning "the one who sacrifices self", has historically been used among Palestinians, particularly within militant contexts, to refer to individuals who are willing to sacrifice themselves for a cause or a larger purpose. The fida’i (or fida’yi) guerrilla fighter transformed into an icon of Palestinian resistance after the Battle of Karameh in 1968, where for the first time Palestinian fighters were perceived to be scoring a victory against the Israeli army. Throughout the 1970s, amaliyyat fida’iyya (operations of self-sacrifice) became a central strategy for Palestinian resistance groups. In the Gaza Strip, the fida’iyeen fought for liberation, not religion, and were never called mujahidin ("fighters of the jihad for God") due to politics and religion. All fida’iyeen (fedayeen) and all noncombatant victims are considered shuhada’ (martyrs).

Istishhadi, meaning "martyrous one", is a newer term developed by Islamist organization Hamas and is used specifically by Palestinians for those carrying out amaliyyat istishhadiyya (martyrdom operations). According to Palestinian anthropologist Nasser Abufarha, istishhadi did not previously exist in the Arabic dictionary. Hamas introduced martyrdom operations, generally known as suicide bombings in the West, as a form of political violence in the spring of 1994 when they carried out their first operations in the towns of Afula and Hadera.

Istishhadi is different from the concepts of shahid or fida'i in that istishhadi is the idea of proactively seeking martyrdom; an idea that is not traditionally Islamic. While the shahid concept hints at victimization, the proactive concept of istishhadi highlights heroism in the sacrificial act. While fida’i took on missions that would surely result in death, the istishhadiyeen take their own lives. Hamas coined the term istishhadi with the aim of attaching religion to self-sacrifice because Hamas believes Islam is "the most solid ideology through which to achieve the goals of the Palestinian national struggle." In addition, the act of the istishhadi is seen as a "blood covenant" through which the exchange of blood fuses human life with the land.

Contrary to Muhammad Abd al-Qadir Abu Faris's work Shuhada’ al-Filastin (Palestinian Martyrs), Laleh Khalili argues that Palestinian identity has not always been about martyrdom and that national narratives are not static. The "roots" of martyrdom commemoration and narratives are neither Palestinian ‘‘cultural’’ characteristics, nor exclusively a result of Islamic or Islamist teachings. Palestinian narratives elevating martyrs have changed over time through adaptations to local, regional, and international conditions.

== Evolution of use by militant groups ==
The evolution of martyrdom, known as Istishhad, from its Islamic origins into a central tenet of Palestinian nationalist identity, embraced by both religious and secular factions, is closely linked to the rise and activities of Palestinian Islamist organizations like Hamas and the Palestinian Islamic Jihad (PIJ). Istishhad has been integral to Palestinian society and collective consciousness since the 1990s, with its ethos of self-sacrifice deeply embedded through indoctrination and suicide bombings carried out by Hamas, the PIJ, and other militant groups. Hatina writes that self-sacrifice has become a formative ethos of Palestinian Islam in the struggle against Israel. It has also become a moral justification for Palestinian suicide bombings.

Hamas upholds martyrdom as the highest expression of jihad and Islamic belief. Hamas asserts that the use of suicide bombers has empowered the Palestinian people strategically, attributing it to "Palestinian innovative genius” (‘abqariyyat al-ibda‘ al-filastini). Hamas officials have rejected claims that suicide attacks harm the Palestinian cause, asserting that “martyrdom operations” reflect the triumph of the Muslim soul, faith, and spirituality over the Israeli or Western “technological mindset.”

=== In the 1990s ===
The Jerusalem Media and Communication Centre's Weekly Report, ongoing since the start of the First Intifada (1987–1993), initially documented Palestinian fighter deaths simply as "deaths" or "Palestinian deaths". However, by August 1992, the reporting shifted to describing these fatalities as "martyr deaths" or "martyrs", signifying a significant change in narrative. This change provided Hamas with a platform to foster and reinforce the martyrdom culture intertwined with Islam through grassroots efforts. Thus, through Hamas' framing suicide attacks as honorable actions against the enemy, martyrdom played a significant role in shaping Palestinian acceptance of such campaigns.

During the Oslo Accords, the Islamist militant groups Hamas and Palestinian Islamic Jihad (PIJ) had trouble gaining wide acceptance for their martyrdom operations due to Palestinians' hope that the Oslo Accords would result in agreements with Israel that would address the Palestinian call for political independence. To recruit volunteers during this time, Hamas and PIJ groomed members to accept death and made promises about the afterlife. However, after the collapse of the Oslo Accords and at the beginning of the Second Intifada, popular interest in martyr operations grew.

=== 2000s to present ===
During the Second Intifada (2000–2005), self-sacrifice became even more deeply rooted in Palestinian society. Nationalistic factions aligned with the Palestinian National Authority also embraced it as a political tool to influence public opinion. Perpetrators of suicide bombings were glorified as heroes. These actions of self-sacrifice were perceived as a method to reclaim lost dignity, both on a national and familial level. Families of the martyrs gained social standing and material support. During the second intifada, martyrdom evolved beyond its religious connotations, becoming an ideal for secular nationalists' resistance identity.

Palestinian officials have emphasized the role of sacrifice and martyrdom as a means of gaining international attention and achieving political goals. Hassan Al-Kashef, Director-General of the Palestinian Information Ministry, once stated that "The only way to impose our conditions is inevitably through our blood. Had it not been for this blood, the world would have never been interested in us ... the power of the Intifada is our only weapon".

== Commemorative forms ==
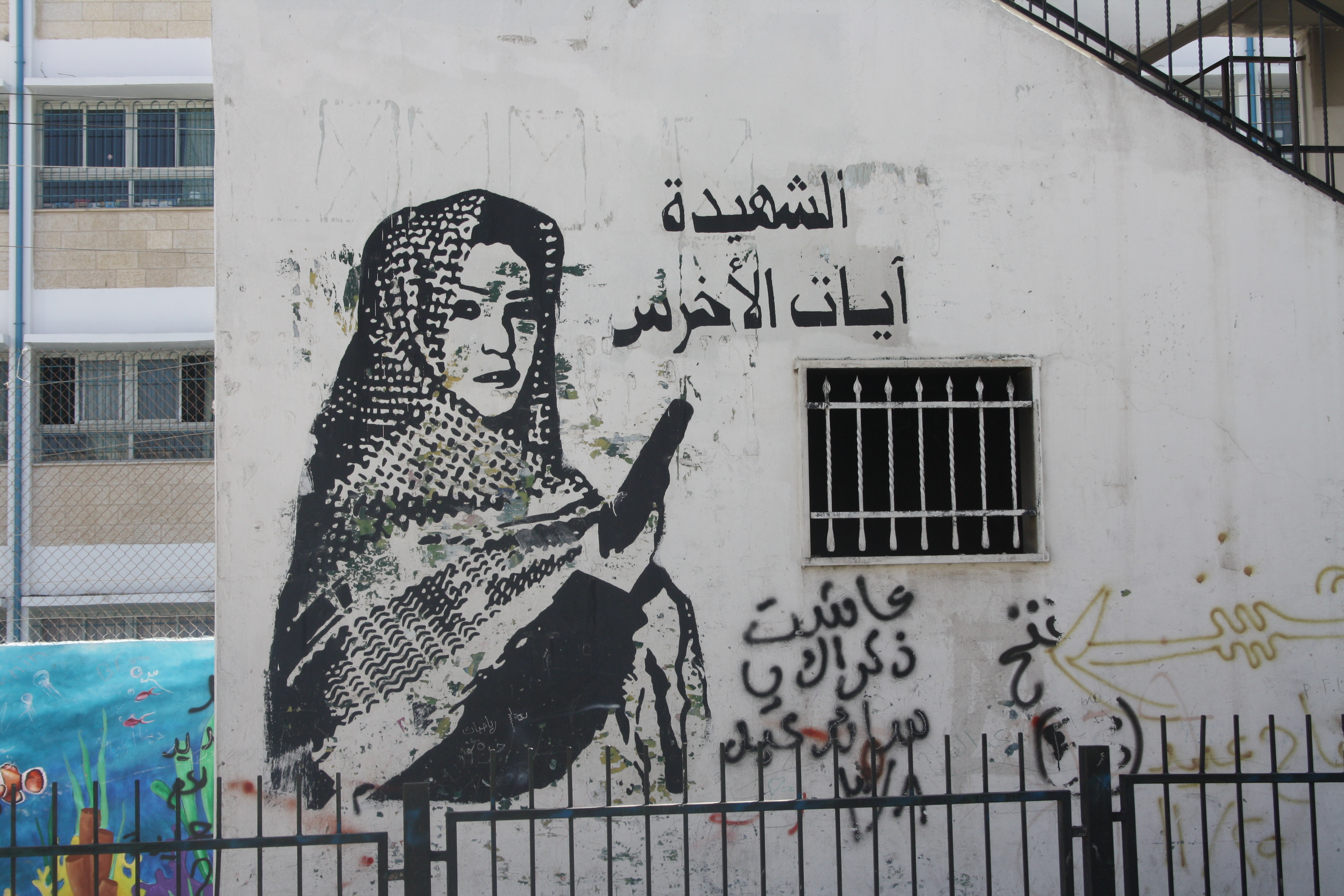
Mural of Ayat al-Akhras, a Palestinian teenage suicide bomber who killed two Israeli civilians in 2002, at a girls' school in Dheisheh

In Palestine, both political groups and NGOs promote commemorative narratives using the following forms: history-telling, commemorative images, education, published and electronic media, honorific naming (of events, people and spaces), and ceremonial gatherings. Writers and poets have also transmitted these images and icons. Political institutions, members of the local and international Palestinian elite, Palestinian NGOs, and refugees use the narrative of commemoration to explain the past, present, and future. Laleh Kahlili states that "particular commemorative practices can be interpreted as engaging a nationalist audience in one setting, and as appealing to international human rights in another": the same narrative can hold different purposes depending on audience and member of society.

=== History-telling ===
Researchers have examined the depictions of fida’iyyin and martyrs in Palestinian poems, as well as the role of poetry as a method for transmitting memory. Mahmud Darwish’s poems transmit icons and images to a broader audience when sung by popular singers. Ghassan Kanafani’s literary fiction, as well as many other writers and poets, have likewise promulgated these icons. Revolutionary songs have also celebrated the fida’iyeen. Originally the Palestinian national anthem that had started with “Biladi, Biladi, Biladi (My country, my country, my country)” was modified to “Fida’i, Fida’i, Fida’i (sacrificer, sacrificer, sacrificer),” and this new version is the official anthem that is sung every morning in Palestinian schools and at official ceremonies.

=== Naming of events, people and spaces ===
Through her fieldwork, Khalili found refugee camp performance groups named after Muhammad al-Durra and other local martyrs. UNRWA schools in Lebanon are named after Palestinian villages or towns (many of which were destroyed in 1948), and every Lebanese UNRWA school contains maps and information about these towns or villages. Outside the occupied territories, refugee camps are places where Palestinian organizations have some control over the naming and arrangement of spaces.

In 2010, the Palestinian Authority "postponed" for "technical reasons" the official dedication ceremony of a public square in Al-Bireh that was named after Dalal Mughrabi, the leader of the 1978 Coastal Road massacre, in which at least 35 Israeli civilians were killed. There was an informal commemoration in which the head of the PA's National Political Guidance office did not participate, but told a reporter that the episode was "part of our heritage that led to the peace process and agreements."

In the personal realm, children are sometimes named after martyrs. Khalili states that a woman at the Nahr al-Barid camp named her baby girl Wafa after Wafa Idriss.

=== Social events ===
Mosques in refugee camps serve as sites of commemorative ceremonies and not just places of prayer. Mosque loudspeakers broadcast deaths, timing and place of funerals, dates of ceremonies and demonstrations, and other events.

=== Media ===
Palestinian martyrs are featured highly in the Palestinian media, in television, radio, newspapers, literature, internet, leaflets, posters, videos, and songs. These appearances in the media are crafted and disseminated by organizations that endorse and carry out “martyrdom operations,” such as the al-Aqsa Martyrs Brigades. The strategic manipulation of media by these organizations plays a pivotal role in endorsing and glorifying martyrdom within Palestinian society. This involves shaping the identity of martyrs through published texts online, along with the distribution of visual and audio materials. These materials mold public opinion and enhance the organization's profile in the competitive landscape of armed groups.

==== Posters ====
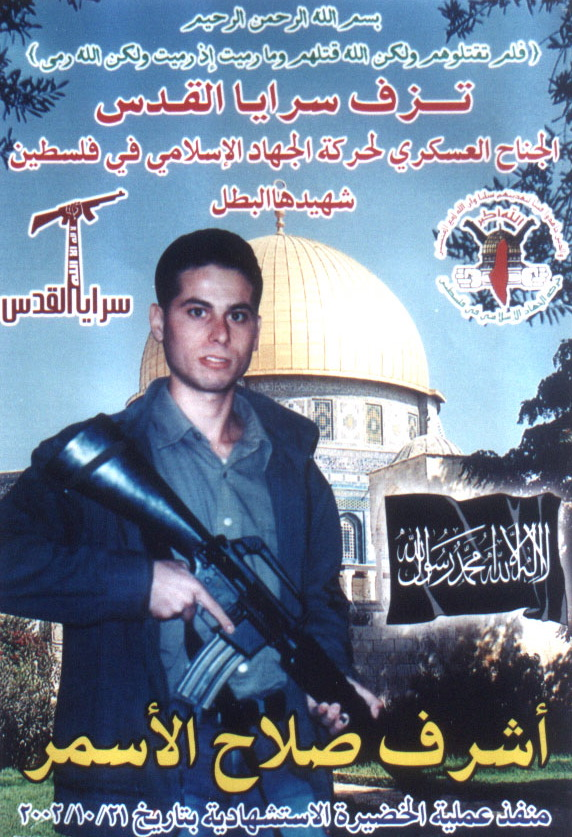
A poster commemorating suicide bomber Ashraf Sallah Alasmar found by the Israel Defense Forces in Jenin, West Bank (Palestine). Al Jazeera has also reported on similar martyr posters.

Using photographs to memorialize martyrs is not unique to Palestinians, but to transfer martyrs into the public sphere by covering walls with their posters in vast numbers is an innovative form of commemoration in the political context of the Middle East. Since the 1970s, posters honoring people who died in the conflict with Israel have been hung around Palestinian streets. In 2006, Abu Hashhash stated that “Posters of Martyrs, produced by different Palestinian political parties, are now the leading form through which the concept of martyrdom is represented and communicated.”

Posters contribute to the broader narrative, shaping perceptions, and reinforcing the cultural glorification of martyrdom. Mosques affiliated with Hamas often serve as platforms for propaganda, displaying posters and pamphlets that glorify suicide bombers and incarcerated Hamas militants. An example is the al-Ein mosque in al-Bireh, raided by Israeli forces in September 2003, where posters commemorating Hamas suicide bomber Ramez Fahmi Izz al-Dina Salim adorned the front door, walls, and notice boards. Salim, responsible for a Jerusalem café bombing in September 2003, was depicted in front of the al-Aqsa mosque with a caption invoking the mosque's plea for assistance. The raid also uncovered Hamas propaganda, including leaflets advocating "spectacular suicide bombing attacks" against U.S. forces in Iraq.

Regardless of the martyr's political affiliation, age, or gender, three essential and consistent elements may be present in posters: a photograph of the martyr, an 'obituary' text typically featuring a Quranic verse, and various symbols.

==== Social media ====
Martyrs are revered in Palestinian social networks, where content memorializing them and praising their heroism is prevalent. Martyrs are often honored by the creation of a fan page on social networks. Family members share pictures, participants express their grief, and eulogies are posted, generating a following of thousands. Such platforms are also used to disseminate provocative content. Additionally, martyrs are commemorated in songs that laud their heroism, while Photoshop images depict them against heavenly backgrounds, accompanied by captions like "The shaheeds [martyrs] do not die, rather their blood adorns the revolution."

=== Education ===
Palestinian textbooks have explicitly addressed the "appreciation of the concept of martyrdom and martyrs" as a learning objective. According to a report commissioned by the EU-commissioned Georg Eckert Institute, in Palestinian textbooks, "Direct calls for violence against Israelis were not found" but "Violence against Israeli civilians, such as that perpetrated in attacks by Palestinian organizations in the 1970s, is not condemned but rather portrayed as a legitimate method of the struggle during that period; terrorist acts, such as that committed by Dalal al-Mughrabi are recounted as examples of self-sacrificing ‘resistance’."

The Palestinian curriculum places a strong emphasis on rote learning, including the memorization of poems and songs that glorify self-sacrifice. Successful performances, as evidenced in classroom videos, earn approval from teachers. Abd al-Rahim Mahmud's poem "The Martyr," featured in some textbooks, includes the line, "I see my death without my stolen right and without my country as a desired one." Signs on the walls of Hamas-run kindergartens read: "The children of the kindergarten are the shahids [martyrs] of tomorrow." Teachers' guides incorporate depictions of jihad as an obligation, glorifying martyrdom as a noble sacrifice accompanied by the promise of heavenly rewards for those who die.

In 2006, a study conducted by a Palestinian psychiatrist in Gaza revealed that among children aged 12 to 14, 36% of boys and 17% of girls expressed a desire to become martyrs when they reach the age of 18. In 2017, Hamas aired a children's TV program in Gaza, showcasing young children praising suicide attacks and expressing a desire to sacrifice themselves for the liberation of Jerusalem and Palestine. The program featured the grandchildren of Umm Nidal, a former Hamas MP, who celebrated her sons' suicide attacks against Israelis. A granddaughter expressed pride in her father's actions and said she hoped to become a martyr for Hamas. In November 2023, a kindergarten in Beit Awwa released videos depicting children engaging in simulated military drills with toy guns, depicting the killing of IDF soldiers, and simulating a mock funeral for a child “martyr”. According to a report by the Jewish Chronicle, students in Gaza schools are taught mathematics by calculating the number of martyrs who have died in Palestinian uprisings.

Some NGOs take on a pedagogic role; in some programs, children act out skits based on people and events to learn about the guerrillas or martyrs of the time and to revere them. The Arab Resource Centre for Popular Arts (ARCPA) produced an "Ahmad and Maryam Learning Package," which is a textbook based on different sources such as oral histories and interviews. The textbook narrates the story of Ahmad and Maryam, two Palestinian children from the village of Saffuriyya, and their 1948 flight to Lebanon. The 1948 Palestine war is depicted in cartoons, and violence is not palliated. The book displays weapons only being carried by Zionists (who are identified by a Star of David and their European appearance), and the Palestinian villagers are not shown fighting back.

== Symbolism ==
In Palestinian culture, there is a custom of re-contextualizing martyr funerals as weddings. Instead of framing the death of a martyr as a sorrowful event, Palestinian myth portrays it as a wedding ceremony where the deceased is symbolically wedded to the land of Palestine. This transformation emphasizes the symbolic act of turning a funeral into a wedding as a representation of their collective struggle and resilience.

== Financial support ==
The Palestinian Authority Martyrs Fund, administered by the Palestinian Authority (PA), provides monthly cash stipends to the families of Palestinians involved in politically motivated violence against Israel, including those killed, injured, or imprisoned. The fund also extends disbursements to bystanders and Palestinians incarcerated in Israeli jails. In 2016, the PA disbursed approximately NIS 1.1 billion (US$303 million) in stipends and additional benefits to the families of individuals referred to as 'martyrs.

== In comparative scholarship ==
Scholarship comparing suicide bombing in Pakistan and Palestine, found that post-martyrdom acknowledgment and the glorification of suicide martyrs is less widespread in Pakistan. Palestinians tend to gather a more extensive collection of oral, written, pictorial and mythical material related to this phenomenon.

The culture of martyrdom and death leads to linguistic twists. For example, Hamas leader Abdel Aziz al-Rantisi likened martyrdom to the "industry of life", and the claim of Ahmad Bahr, deputy speaker of the PNA Legislative Council, that "martyrdom is life, a life of heroism and valor." These expressions highlight a shared element of glorifying violence and death between contemporary radical Islamic movements and Fascism, despite their fundamental differences, as exemplified by the Spanish civil war slogan, “Viva la Muerte!”, or “Long-live death”.

== See also ==
- Education in Palestine
- Gaza: An Inquest into Its Martyrdom
- List of Palestinian suicide attacks
- Martyr (2017 film) from Lebanon
- Martyrdom in Iran (Iran–Palestine relations)
- Olei Hagardom – 12 insurgents who "rose to the gallows"
- Palestinian suicide attacks
- Shaheed (1948 film) from India
- Shaheed (1962 film) from Pakistan
- Shaheed (1965 film) about Shaheed Bhagat Singh
- Use of child suicide bombers by Palestinian militant groups
