= Abdel-Shafi =

Abdel-Shafi is a surname. Notable people with the surname include:

- Salah Abdel-Shafi (born 1962), Palestinian economist and ambassador, son of Haidar
- Haidar Abdel-Shafi (1919–2007), Palestinian physician, community leader, and political leader
