= Embassy of Palestine, Riyadh =

Embassy of the State of Palestine in Saudi Arabia سفارة دولة فلسطين لدى السعودية
- Location: Riyadh
- Ambassador: Bassem Al-Agha

The Embassy of the State of Palestine in Saudi Arabia (Arabic: سفارة دولة فلسطين لدى السعودية) is the diplomatic mission of the Palestine in Saudi Arabia. It is located in Riyadh.

Initially, this mission was established as the representative office of the Palestine Liberation Organization, and it was upgraded to the Embassy of the State of Palestine on January 1, 1989.

== List of ambassadors/representatives ==
No.	Name	Name in Arabic	Appointment	Dismissal	Remarks
1	Hussein Al-Sharqawi	حسين الشرقاوي	1968	1973	
2	Said Al Muzayin	سعيد المزين	1973	1979	
3	Rafeeq Natsheh	رفيق النتشة	1979	1990	
4	Subhi Abu Karsh	صبحي أبو كرش	1990	1994	Died in office
5	Mustafa Sheikh Deib	مصطفى الشيخ ديب	1994	2005	
6	Jamal Al Shobaki	جمال الشوبكي	2006	2013	
7	Bassem Al-Agha	باسم الآغا	2013	incumbent	

== See also ==
- Palestine–Saudi Arabia relations
- List of diplomatic missions in Saudi Arabia
- List of diplomatic missions of Palestine
