= Suba, Hebron =

Village in Hebron Governorate, Palestine

Suba, Hebron Arabic: سوبا
- Suba, Hebron
- Location of Suba, Hebron within Palestine
- Country: Palestine
- Governorate: Hebron Governorate
- Elevation: 485 m (1,591 ft)

Population (2017)
  - Total: 138

Suba, also known as Khirbet Suba, is a Palestinian village located in the Hebron Governorate, northwest of the city of Hebron in the southern West Bank.

== Geography ==
The village is situated at an elevation of approximately 485 metres above sea level. It is bordered by Tarqumiyah to the north, Homs to the south, Dura to the east, and Idna to the west.

== Population ==
The village is administratively affiliated with the Idna Municipal Council. According to the 1961 census, Suba had a population of approximately 125. In the 2017 census, the population was recorded at approximately 138.

== Antiquities ==
Khirbet Suba contains the remains of ruined walls, carved stone foundations, and rock-cut caves.

== See also ==
- Idna
- Dura, Hebron
- Hebron Governorate
