= Embassy of Palestine, Beijing =

Embassy of the State of Palestine in China سفارة دولة فلسطين لدى الصين 巴勒斯坦驻华大使馆
- Location: Beijing
- Address: Sanlitun
- Ambassador: Fariz Mehdawi

The Embassy of the State of Palestine in China (Arabic: سفارة دولة فلسطين لدى الصين; Chinese: 巴勒斯坦驻华大使馆) is the diplomatic mission of the State of Palestine in China. It is located in Sanlitun in Beijing.

The Palestinian office in Beijing was established in May 1965, but it became the Embassy of the State of Palestine on 31 December 1988. China recognised the State of Palestine and established diplomatic relations on 20 November 1988.

== See also ==
- List of diplomatic missions in China
- List of diplomatic missions of Palestine
