= Lebanon–Palestine relations =

- Lebanon: Palestine

Diplomatic mission
- None: Embassy of Palestine, Beirut

Lebanon–Palestine relations refers to bilateral relations between the Republic of Lebanon and the State of Palestine.

== Political relations ==
=== Historical ===
The connection between Lebanon and Palestine dates back to multiple centuries, when both regions were first inhabited by the Canaanites, which were then followed by Bronze and Iron Ages, along being part of Neo-Assyrian, Neo-Babylonian, Achaemenid, Macedonian, Seleucid and the Roman Empires, as well as multiple Islamic dynasties of Umayyad and Abbasid Caliphates which were then conquered by the Ottoman Empire in the 16th century. Both countries share a rich and interconnected history and culture. Following the fall of the Ottoman Empire, both Lebanon and Palestine became mandates with the French Mandate for Lebanon and the British Mandate for Palestine respectively. Both mandates ended by the late 1940s.

=== Lebanese Civil War ===
As a result of the Arab–Israeli conflict, a large number of Palestinians fled into Lebanon, causing the number of Palestinians in Lebanon to skyrocket. The influx caused friction between the Muslim-majority Palestinians and the Lebanese Christians, which erupted into conflict in 1975. During this time, southern Lebanon became a base for the Palestine Liberation Organization, who had frequent conflict with the Israel Defense Forces. This eventually escalated into the 1982 Lebanon War and Israel–Lebanon relations severely deteriorated.

Eventually, the PLO was forced out of southern Lebanon to Tunis, and several thousand Palestinians died as a result of the conflict.

=== Middle Eastern crisis ===
In May 2025, Lebanese president Joseph Aoun met with Palestinian president Mahmoud Abbas to begin the process of disarming Palestinian militant groups in Lebanon. They agreed that Palestinian refugee camps aren't "safe havens for extremist groups", and that "weapons should only be with the Lebanese state".

== Diplomatic relations ==
In 1989, Lebanon recognized the Palestinian Declaration of Independence.

On January 6, 2006, the Lebanese Council of Ministers approved the reopening of the PLO office in Beirut, which had been destroyed by the Israeli army during its occupation of West Beirut in September 1982 and remained closed after the Israeli withdrawal. The office reopened on May 15, 2006.

On November 30, 2008, Lebanon and Palestine officially established diplomatic relations.

== Palestinians in Lebanon ==
During the 1948 Palestine war, many Palestinians sought safety in neighboring countries, frequently called the Nakba, including to Lebanon. Then following the outbreak of the Six Day War and War of Attrition, the number of Palestinian refugees increased. By 1987, an estimated 400,000 Palestinians resided in Lebanon.

At the start of 2016, the total number of Palestinian refugees in Lebanon documented by UNRWA 504,000, although many were likely no longer in the country at that time. Estimates of Palestinians present at that time is about 250,000, with many in difficult financial or legal situations.

== See also ==
- PLO in Lebanon
- Palestinians in Lebanon
- Palestinian insurgency in South Lebanon
- Israeli–Lebanese conflict
