= Embassy of Palestine, Pyongyang =

Embassy of the State of Palestine in the Democratic People's Republic of Korea سفارة دولة فلسطين لدى كوريا الشمالية
- Location: Munsudong, Taedonggang District, Pyongyang
- Ambassador: Ismail Ahmed Mohamed Hasan

The Embassy of the State of Palestine in the Democratic People's Republic of Korea (Arabic: سفارة دولة فلسطين لدى كوريا الشمالية) is the diplomatic mission of Palestine in North Korea. It is located in Munsudong, Taedonggang District, Pyongyang.

== See also ==
- List of diplomatic missions in North Korea
- List of diplomatic missions of Palestine
