= Embassy of Palestine, Astana =

Embassy of the State of Palestine in Kazakhstan سفارة دولة فلسطين لدى كازخستان
- Location: Astana
- Ambassador: Muntasir Abu Zeid
- Website: http://www.palestineembassykz.com/

The Embassy of the State of Palestine in Kazakhstan (Arabic: سفارة دولة فلسطين لدى كازخستان) is the diplomatic mission of Palestine in Kazakhstan. It is located in Astana.

== History ==
The Embassy of Palestine in Kazakhstan was officially opened in 1993, shortly after the establishment of diplomatic relations between the two countries on April 6, 1992.

In August 2007, the embassy was moved from Almaty (the former capital) to the new capital Astana. The new building was provided by Kazakhstan to Palestine.

== Location ==
The Embassy of Palestine is located at Kabanbay Batyr Avenue 28, Block 4, Astana 010000, Kazakhstan.

== Notable events ==
On November 3, 2020, CICA's Executive Director Kairat Sarybay had a meeting with the Palestinian Ambassador Muntasir Abu Zaid in the embassy.

== See also ==
- List of diplomatic missions in Kazakhstan
- List of diplomatic missions of Palestine
