= Embassy of Palestine, Tripoli =

Diplomatic mission of the State of Palestine to Libya

Embassy of the State of Palestine in Libya سفارة دولة فلسطين لدى ليبيا
- Location: Tripoli
- Address: Ben Achour area
- Ambassador: Mohammad RahhalSurrogate

The Embassy of the State of Palestine in Libya (Arabic: سفارة دولة فلسطين لدى ليبيا) is the diplomatic mission of the Palestine in Libya. It is located in Ben Achour area in Tripoli.

== See also ==
- List of diplomatic missions in Libya
- List of diplomatic missions of Palestine
