= Embassy of Palestine, Kuwait City =

Embassy of the State of Palestine in Kuwait سفارة دولة فلسطين لدى دولة الكويت
- Location: Mishref, Kuwait
- Address: Diplomatic Area, Block 7A, Plot 48
- Ambassador: Rami Tahboub

The Embassy of the State of Palestine in Kuwait (Arabic: سفارة دولة فلسطين لدى دولة الكويت) is the diplomatic mission of the State of Palestine to the State of Kuwait. The embassy represents the State of Palestine in Kuwait.

The embassy is located in Mishref, in the Diplomatic Area, Block 7A, Plot 48. In February 2026, the embassy moved to its new premises at this location and began receiving visitors there on 15 February 2026.

== See also ==
- List of diplomatic missions in Kuwait
- List of diplomatic missions of Palestine
