= List of diplomatic missions of Palestine =

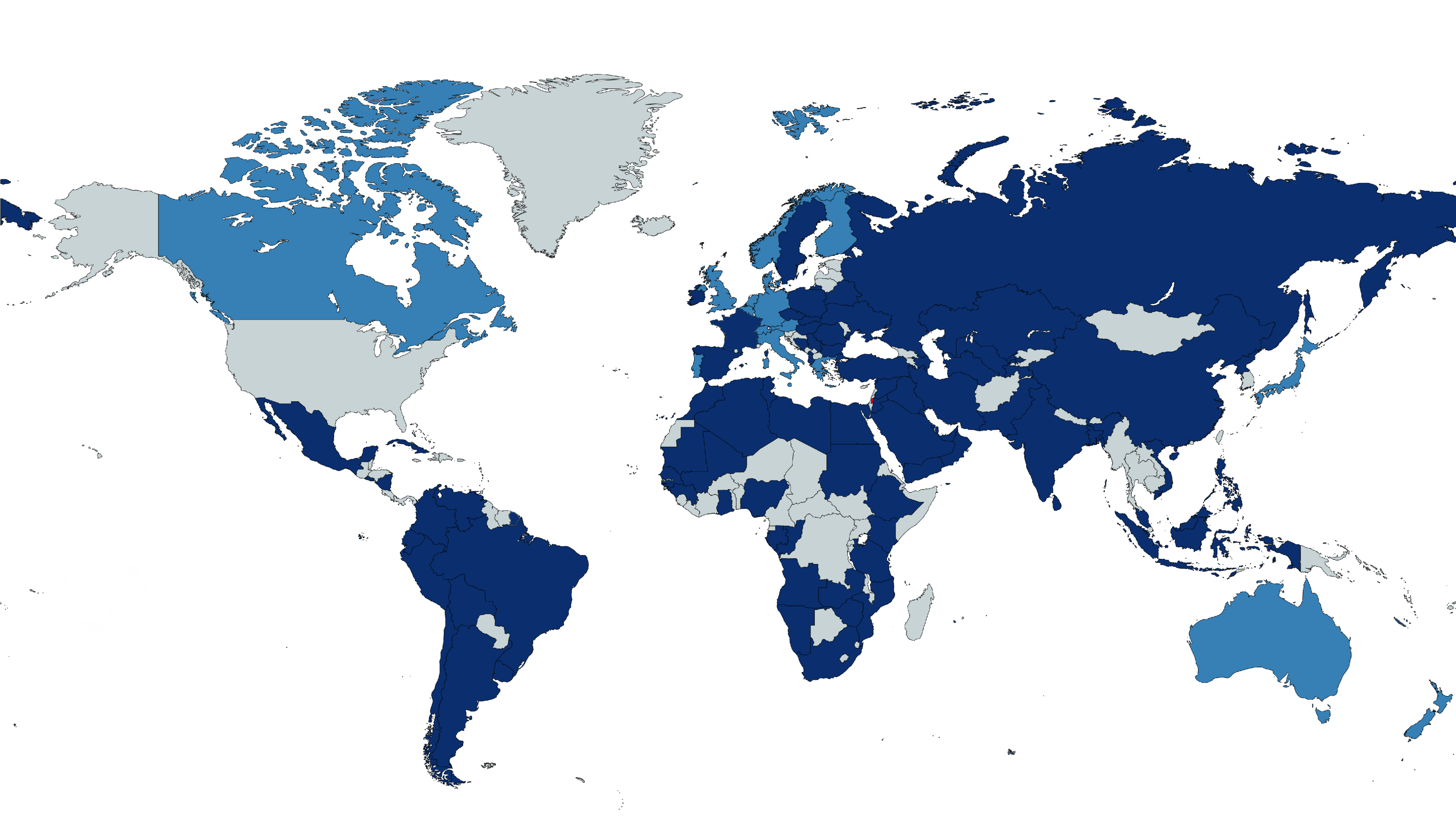
Palestine Official Mission Unofficial Mission

Palestine has a network of embassies worldwide, predominantly in Africa, Asia, Eastern Europe, Latin America, and the Middle East. In countries that do not formally recognize Palestine, the Palestinian Authority is represented by a diplomatic mission referred to as a delegation or representation office, instead of an embassy.

== Africa ==
- Algeria
  - Algiers (Embassy)
- Angola
  - Luanda (Embassy)
- Congo-Brazzaville
  - Brazzaville (Embassy)
- Djibouti
  - Djibouti City (Embassy)
- Egypt
  - Cairo (Embassy)
- Ethiopia
  - Addis Ababa (Embassy)
- Gabon
  - Libreville (Embassy)
- Ghana
  - Accra (Embassy)
- Guinea
  - Conakry (Embassy)
- Guinea-Bissau
  - Bissau (Embassy)
- Ivory Coast
  - Abidjan (Embassy)
- Kenya
  - Nairobi (Embassy)
- Libya
  - Tripoli (Embassy)
- Mali
  - Bamako (Embassy)
- Mauritania
  - Nouakchott (Embassy)
- Morocco
  - Rabat (Embassy)
- Mozambique
  - Maputo (Embassy)
- Namibia
  - Windhoek (Embassy)
- Nigeria
  - Abuja (Embassy)
- Senegal
  - Dakar (Embassy)
- South Africa
  - Pretoria (Embassy)
- Sudan
  - Khartoum (Embassy)
- Tanzania
  - Dar es Salaam (Embassy)
- Tunisia
  - Tunis (Embassy)
- Zambia
  - Lusaka (Embassy)
- Zimbabwe
  - Harare (Embassy)

== Americas ==
- Argentina
  - Buenos Aires (Embassy)
- Bolivia
  - La Paz (Embassy)
- Brazil
  - Brasília (Embassy)
- Chile
  - Santiago de Chile (Embassy)
- Colombia
  - Bogotá (Embassy)
- Cuba
  - Havana (Embassy)
- Ecuador
  - Quito (Embassy)
- El Salvador
  - San Salvador (Embassy)
- Mexico
  - Mexico City (Embassy)
- Nicaragua
  - Managua (Embassy)
- Peru
  - Lima (Embassy)
- Uruguay
  - Montevideo (Embassy)
- Venezuela
  - Caracas (Embassy)

== Asia ==
- Azerbaijan
  - Baku (Embassy)
- Bahrain
  - Manama (Embassy)
- Bangladesh
  - Dhaka (Embassy)
- China
  - Beijing (Embassy)
- India
  - New Delhi (Embassy)
- Indonesia
  - Jakarta (Embassy)
- Iran
  - Tehran (Embassy)
- Iraq
  - Baghdad (Embassy)
  - Erbil (Consulate-General)
- Japan
  - Tokyo (General Mission)
- Jordan
  - Amman (Embassy)
- Kazakhstan
  - Astana (Embassy)
- Kuwait
  - Kuwait City (Embassy)
- Lebanon
  - Beirut (Embassy)
- Malaysia
  - Kuala Lumpur (Embassy)
- North Korea
  - Pyongyang (Embassy)
- Oman
  - Muscat (Embassy)
- Pakistan
  - Islamabad (Embassy)
- Philippines
  - Manila (Embassy)
- Qatar
  - Doha (Embassy)
- Saudi Arabia
  - Riyadh (Embassy)
- Sri Lanka
  - Colombo (Embassy)
- Syria
  - Damascus (Embassy)
- Tajikistan
  - Dushanbe (Embassy)
- Turkey
  - Ankara (Embassy)
  - Istanbul (Consulate-General)
- Turkmenistan
  - Ashgabat (Embassy)
- United Arab Emirates
  - Abu Dhabi (Embassy)
  - Dubai (Consulate-General)
- Uzbekistan
  - Tashkent (Embassy)
- Vietnam
  - Hanoi (Embassy)

== Europe ==
- Albania
  - Tirana (Embassy)
- Austria
  - Vienna (Permanent Mission)
- Belarus
  - Minsk (Embassy)
- Belgium
  - Brussels (Mission)
- Bosnia and Herzegovina
  - Sarajevo (Embassy)
- Bulgaria
  - Sofia (Embassy)
- Cyprus
  - Nicosia (Embassy)
- Czechia
  - Prague (Embassy)
- Denmark
  - Copenhagen (Mission)
- Finland
  - Helsinki (Mission)
- France
  - Paris (Embassy)
- Germany
  - Berlin (Mission)
- Greece
  - Athens (Mission)
- Holy See
  - Rome (Embassy) (Note: The Palestinian Embassy to the Holy See is located outside Vatican territory in Rome, Italy, which does not recognise Palestine.)
- Hungary
  - Budapest (Embassy)
- Ireland
  - Dublin (Embassy)
- Italy
  - Rome (Mission)
- Malta
  - Valletta (Embassy)
- Montenegro
  - Podgorica (Embassy)
- Netherlands
  - The Hague (General Delegation)
- Norway
  - Oslo (Embassy)
- Poland
  - Warsaw (Embassy)
- Portugal
  - Lisbon (Embassy)
- Romania
  - Bucharest (Embassy)
- Russia
  - Moscow (Embassy)
- Serbia
  - Belgrade (Embassy)
- Slovakia
  - Bratislava (Embassy)
- Spain
  - Madrid (Embassy)
- Sweden
  - Stockholm (Embassy)
- Switzerland
  - Bern (General Delegation)
- Ukraine
  - Kyiv (Embassy)
- United Kingdom
  - London (Embassy)

== Embassies – due to open ==
- Australia
  - Canberra (Embassy - due to open)
- Canada
  - Ottawa (Embassy - due to open)

== Multilateral organisations ==
- Arab League (Permanent Mission in Cairo)
- United Nations
  - Geneva (Permanent Observer Mission)
  - New York City (Permanent Observer Mission)
    - Accredited as representative office to Dominican Republic, and the United States.
    - Accredited as an aembassy to Costa Rica.
- UNESCO (Permanent Mission in Paris)
- Organisation of Islamic Cooperation (Permanent Mission in Jeddah)
- European Union
  - Brussels (Mission)
    - Representative office to Belgium and Luxembourg

== Gallery ==
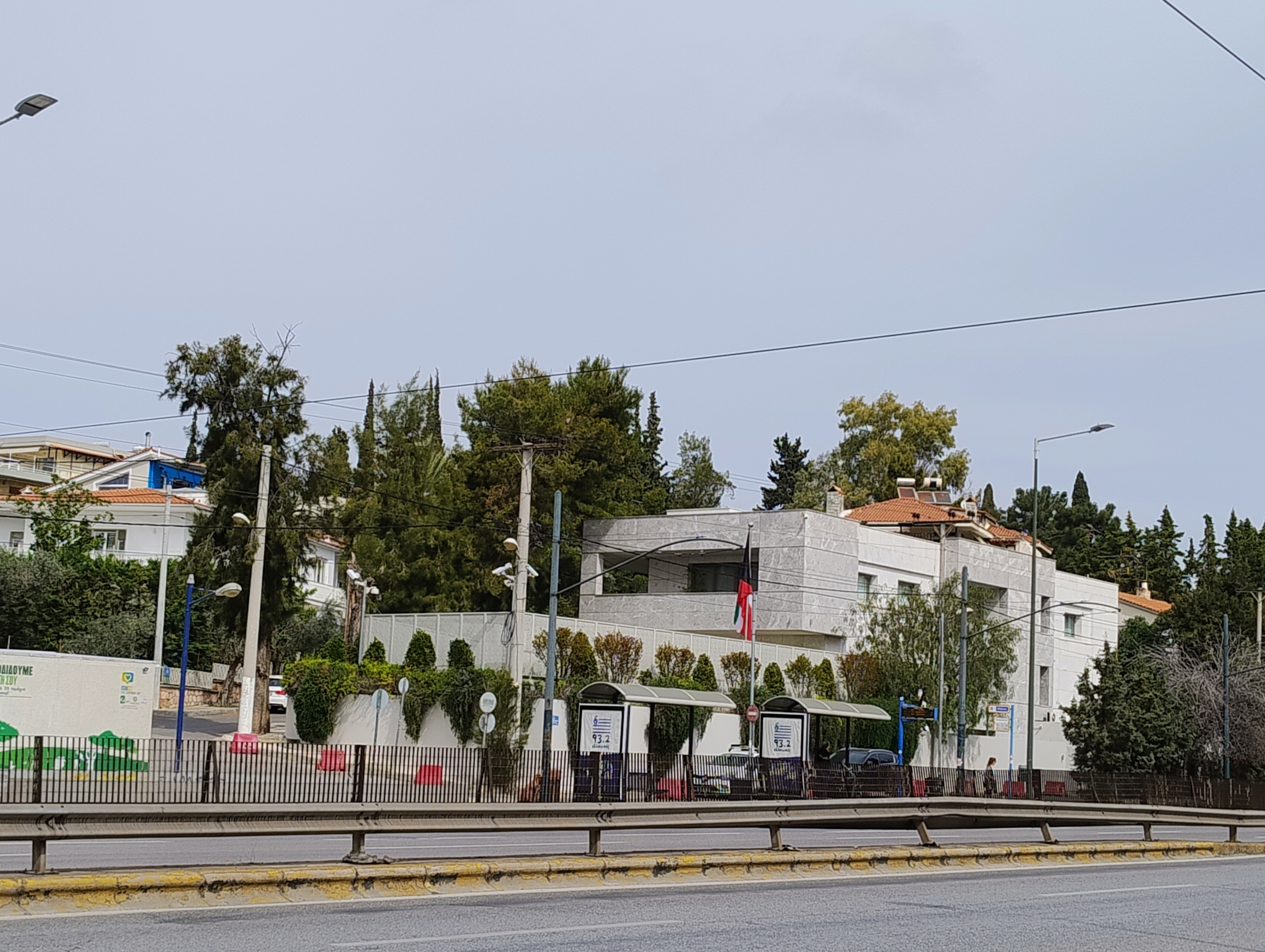
Mission in Athens

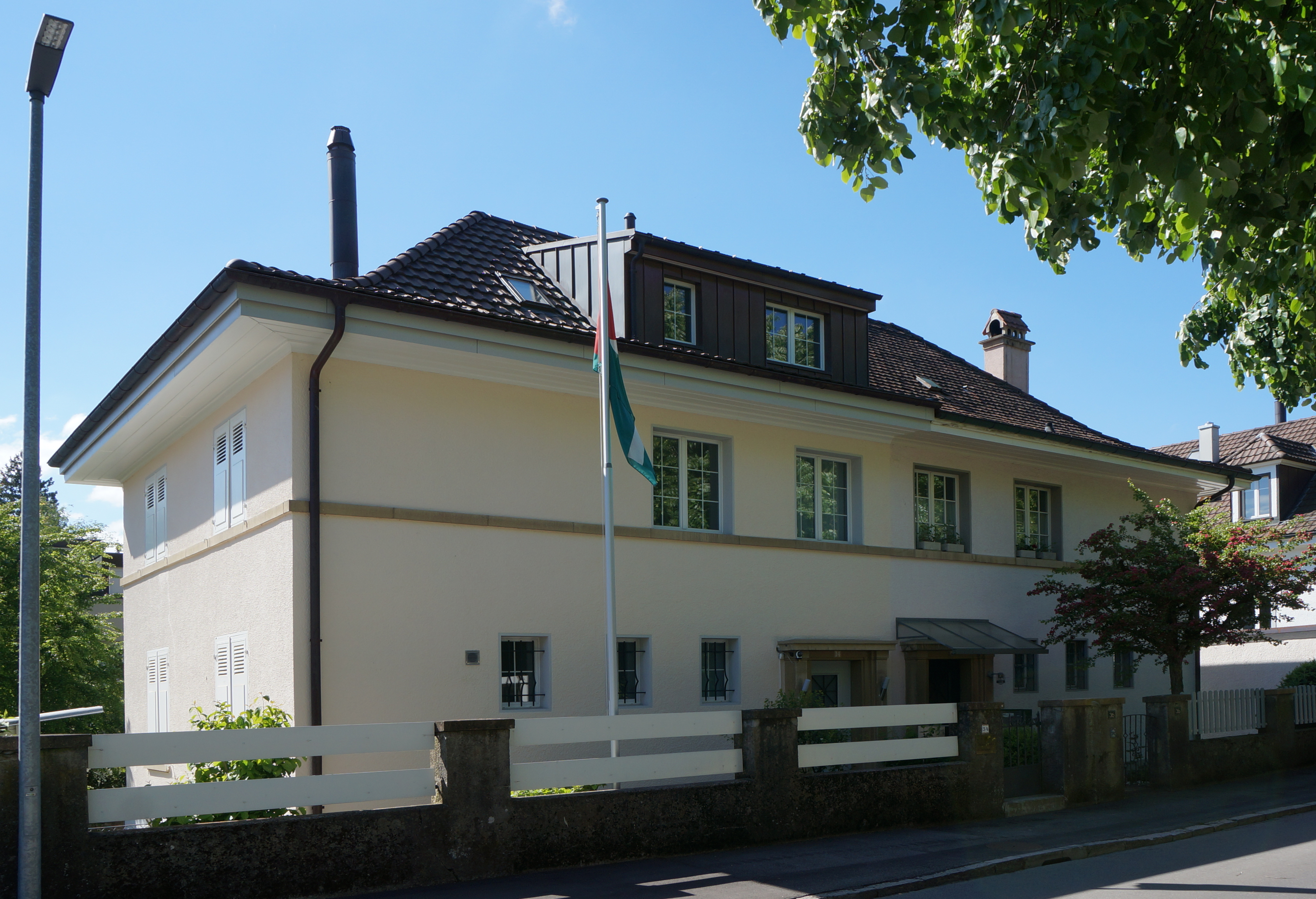
General Delegation in Bern

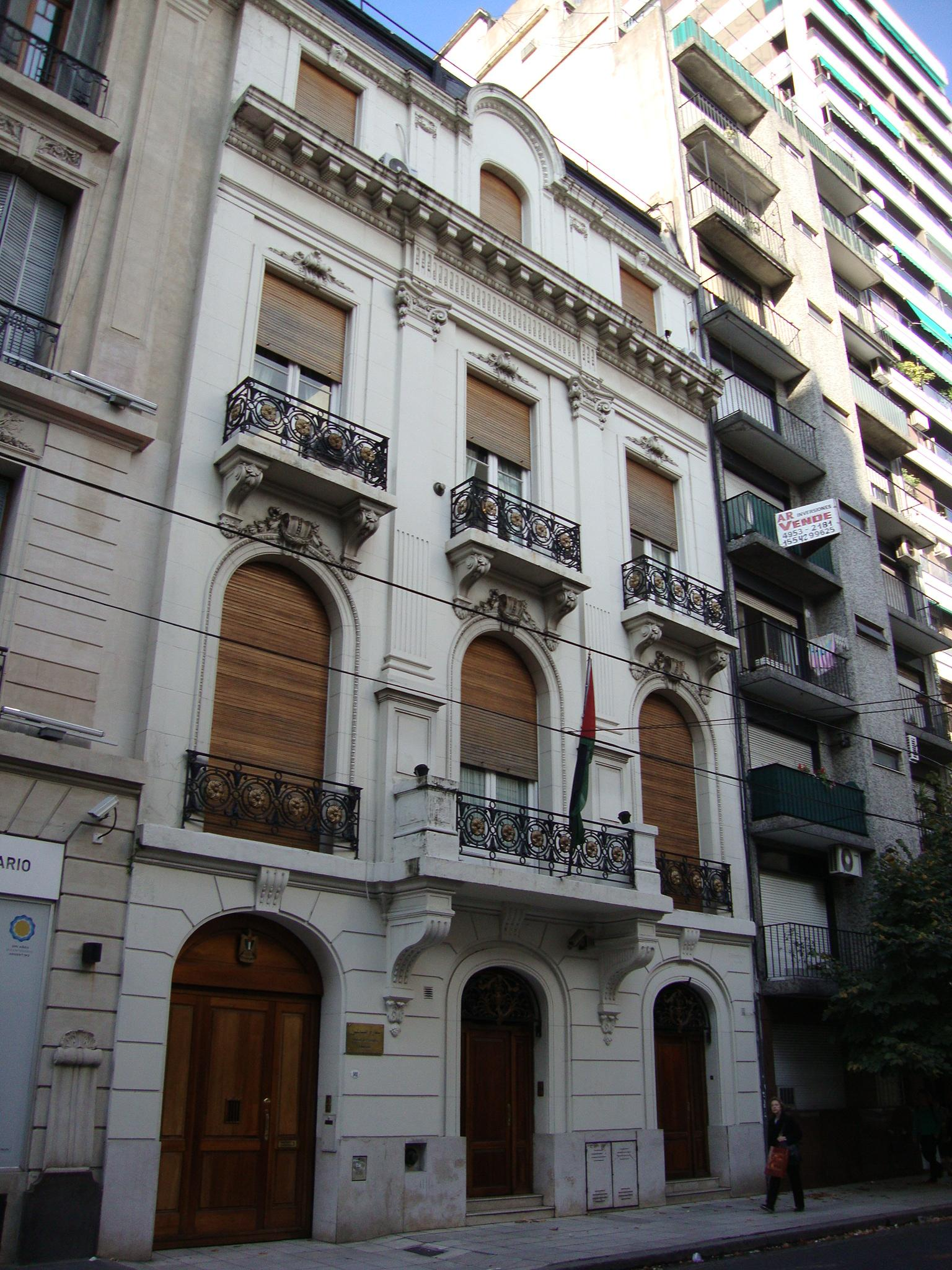
Embassy in Buenos Aires

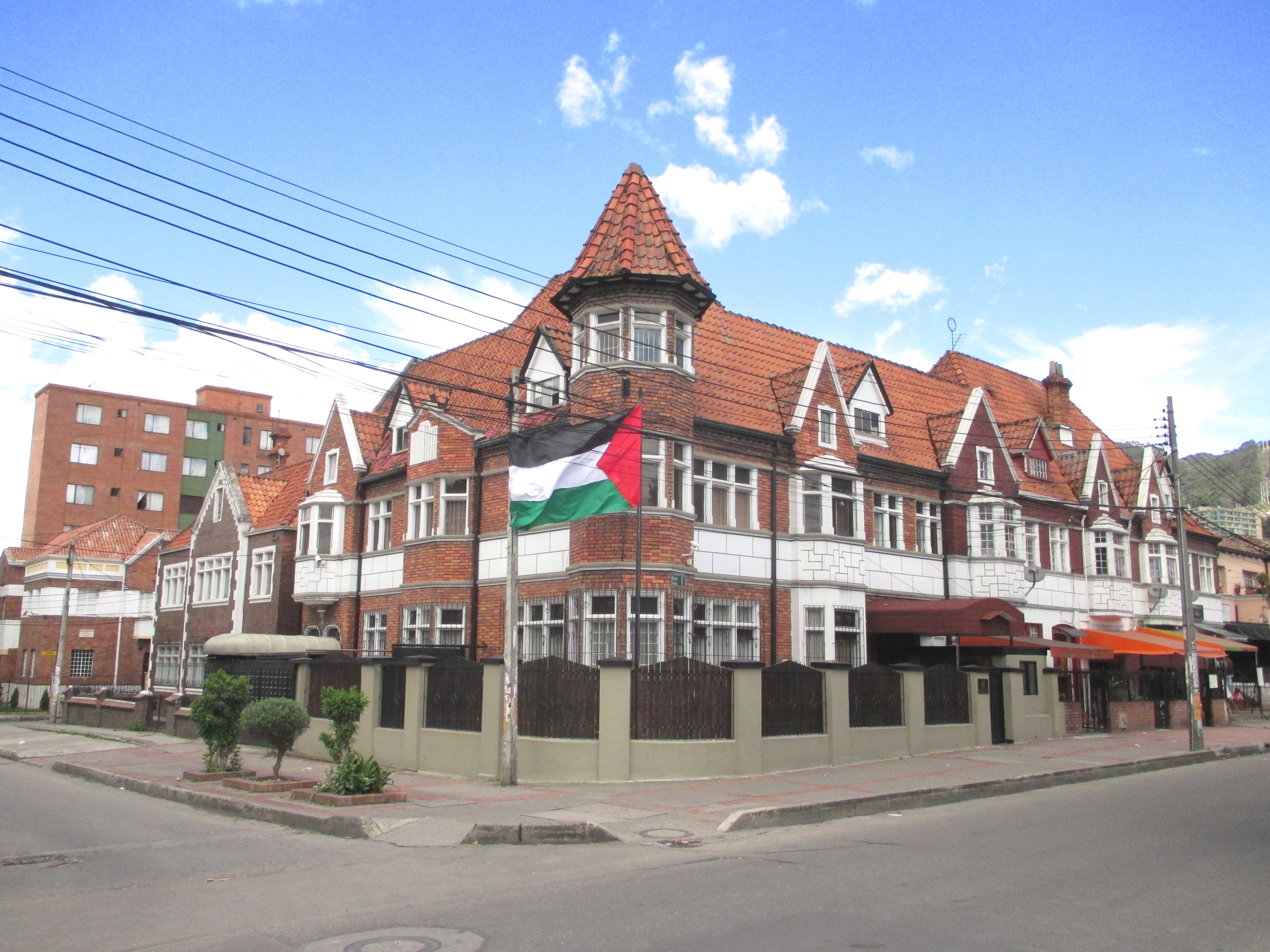
Embassy in Bogotá

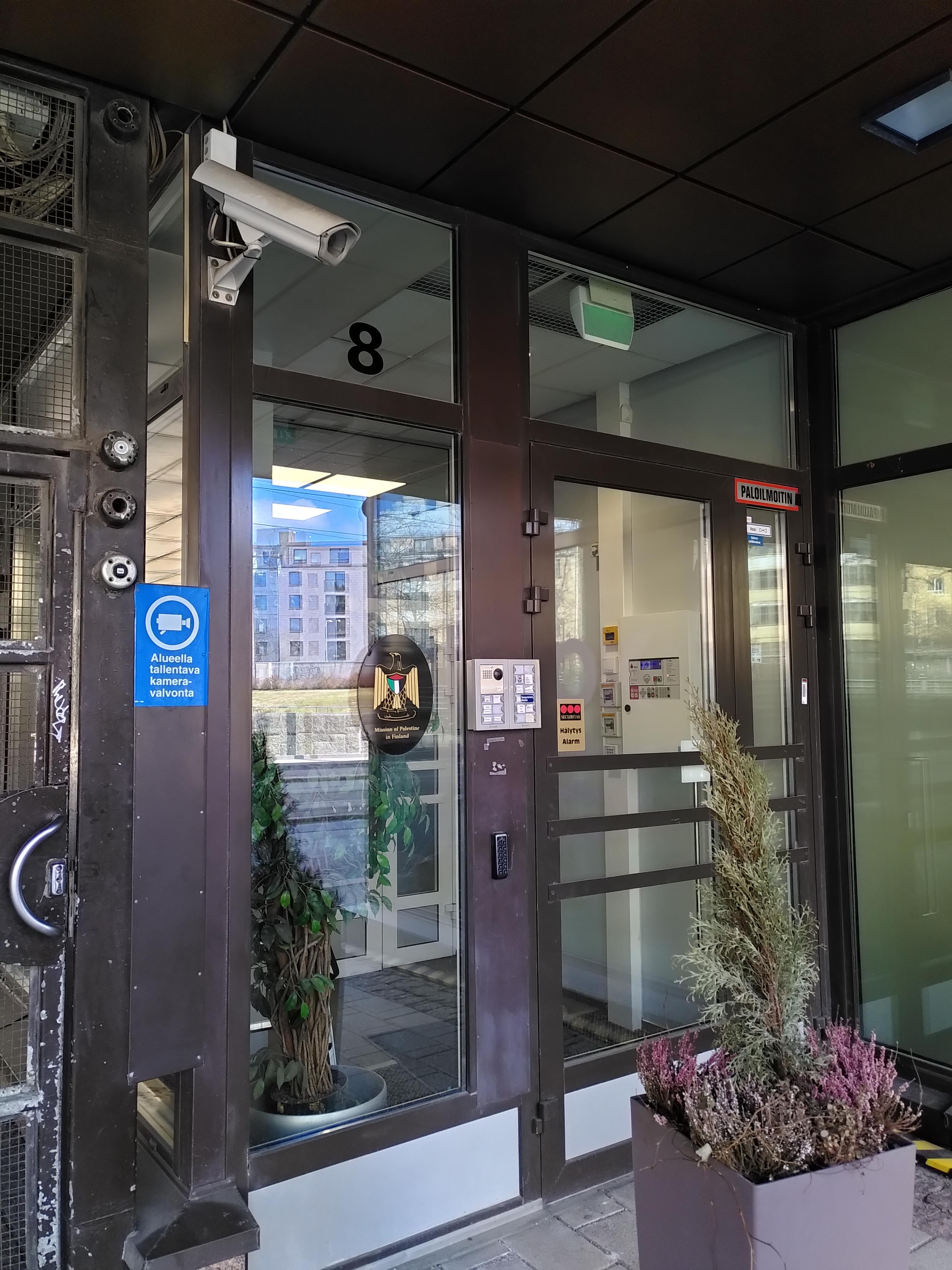
Mission in Helsinki

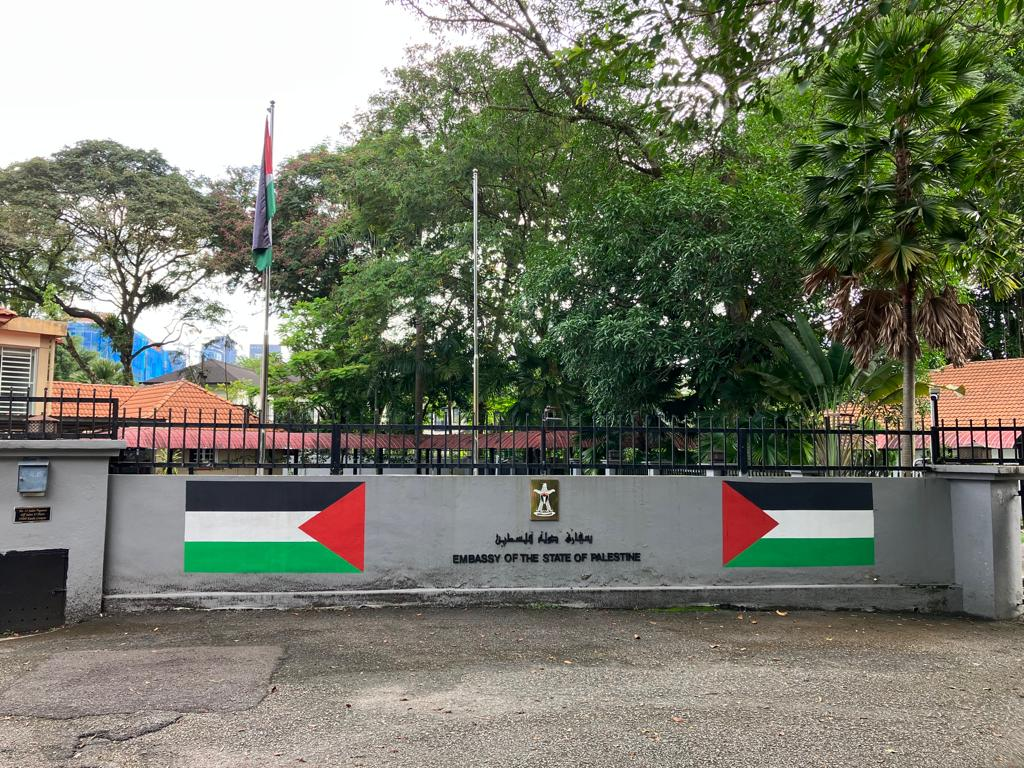
Embassy in Kuala Lumpur

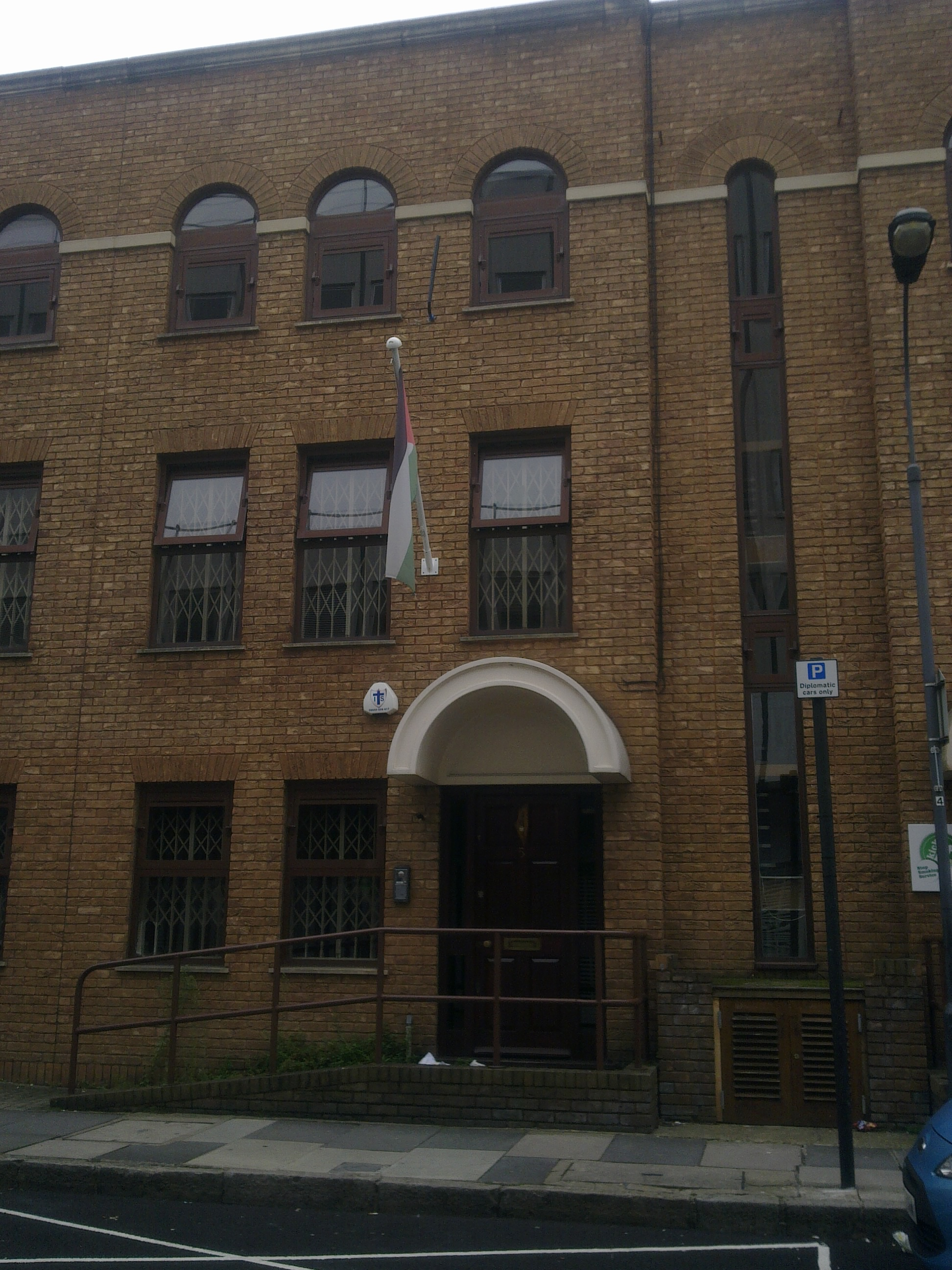
Embassy in London

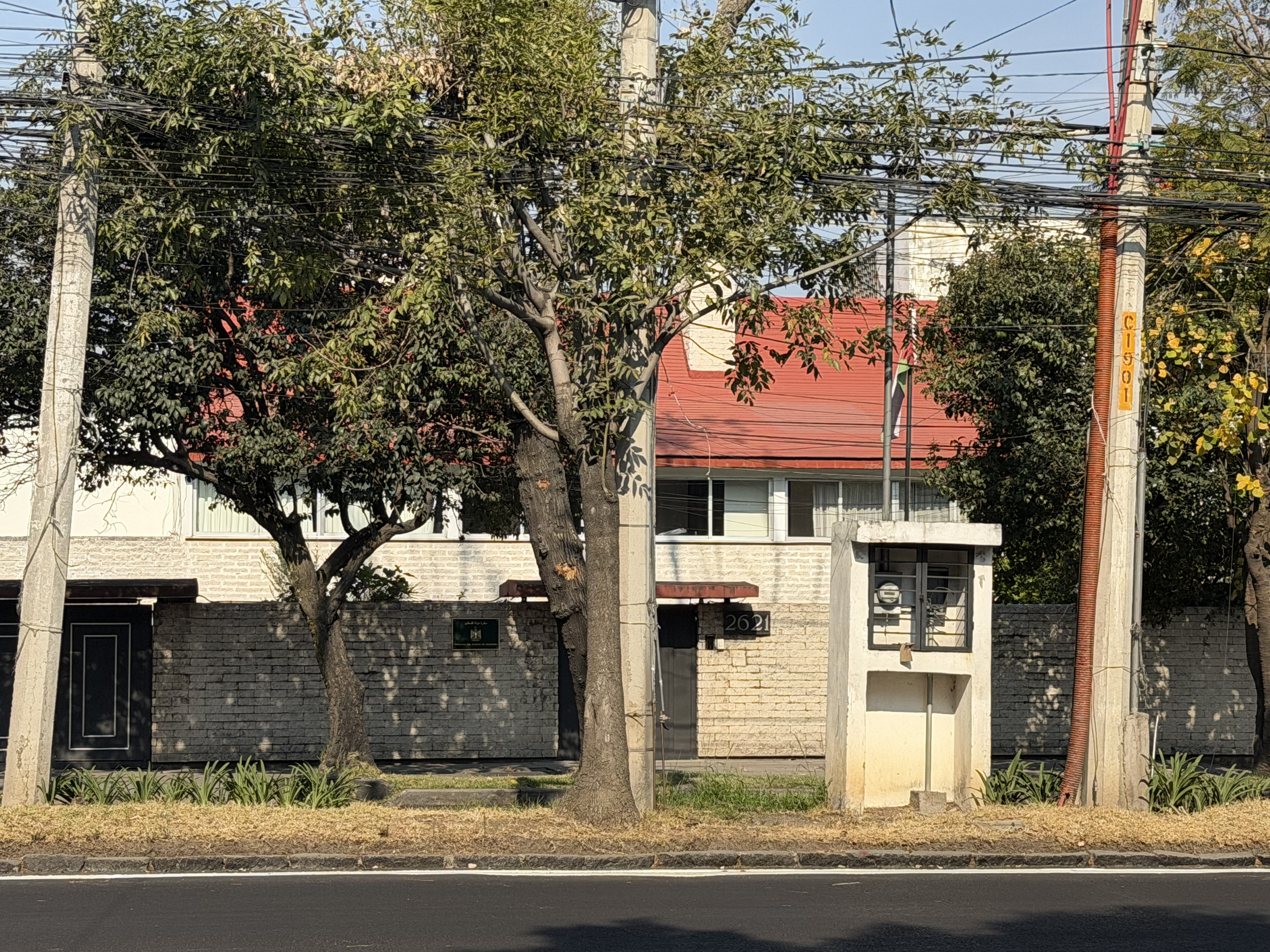
Embassy in Mexico City

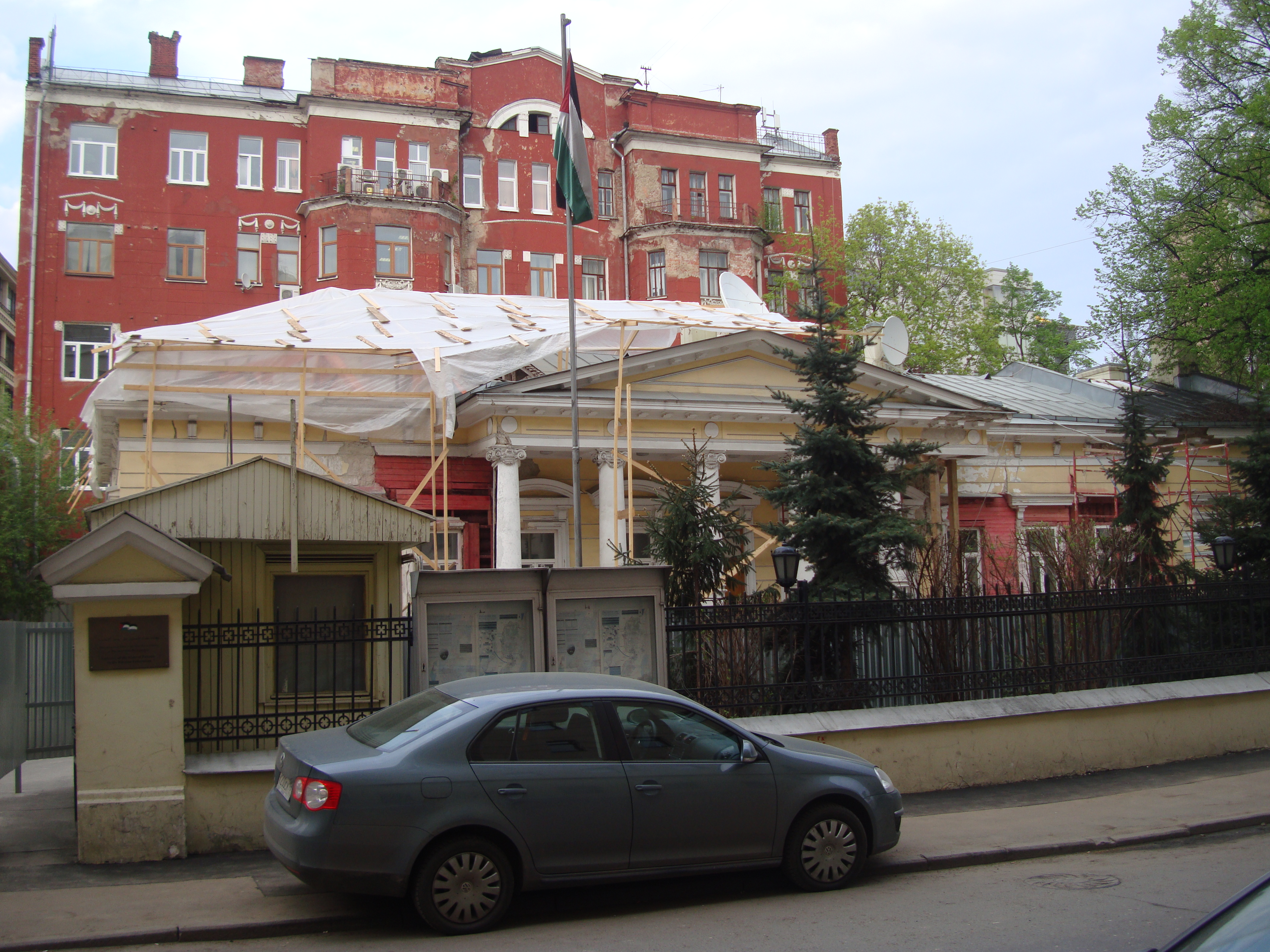
Embassy in Moscow

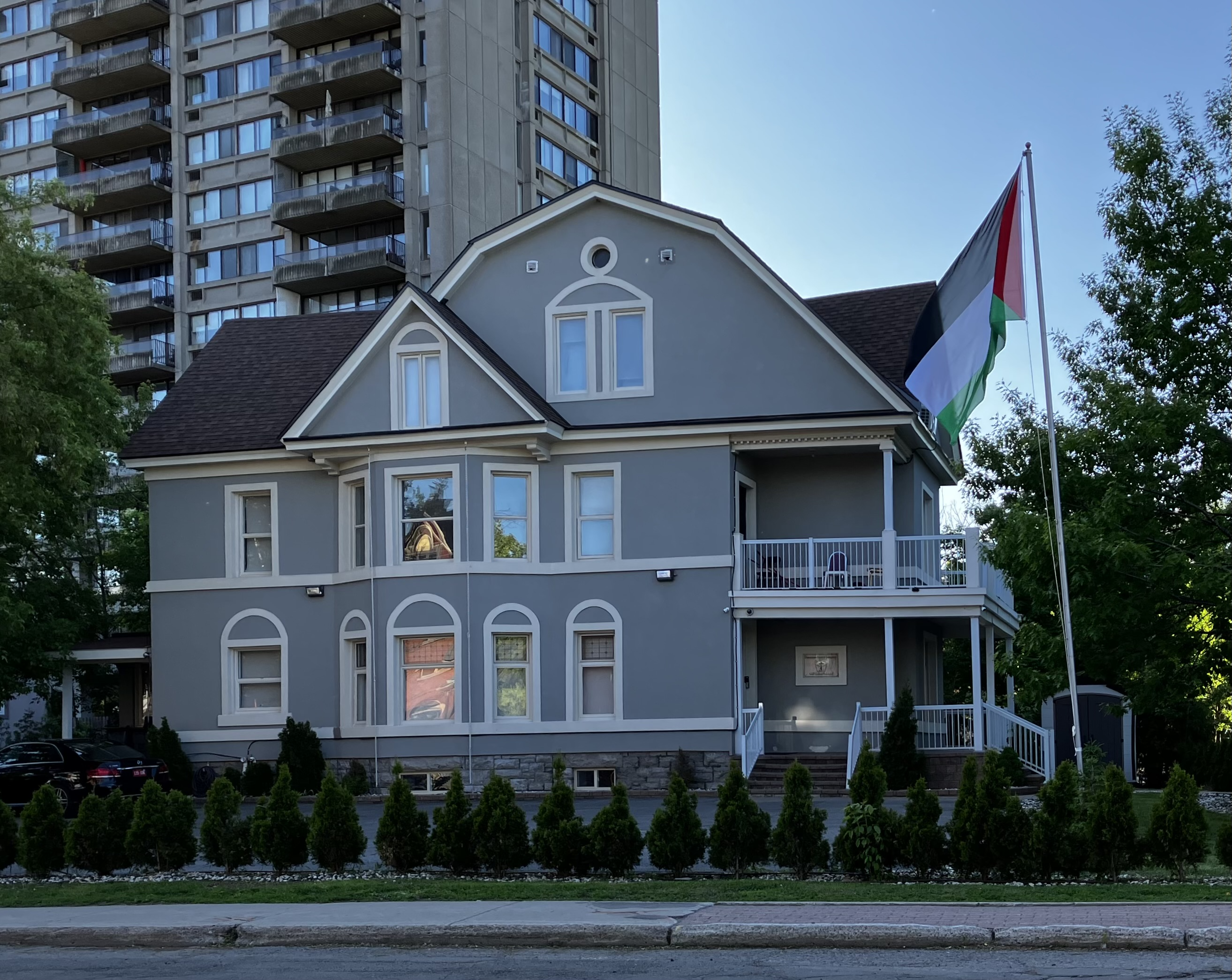
Embassy in Ottawa

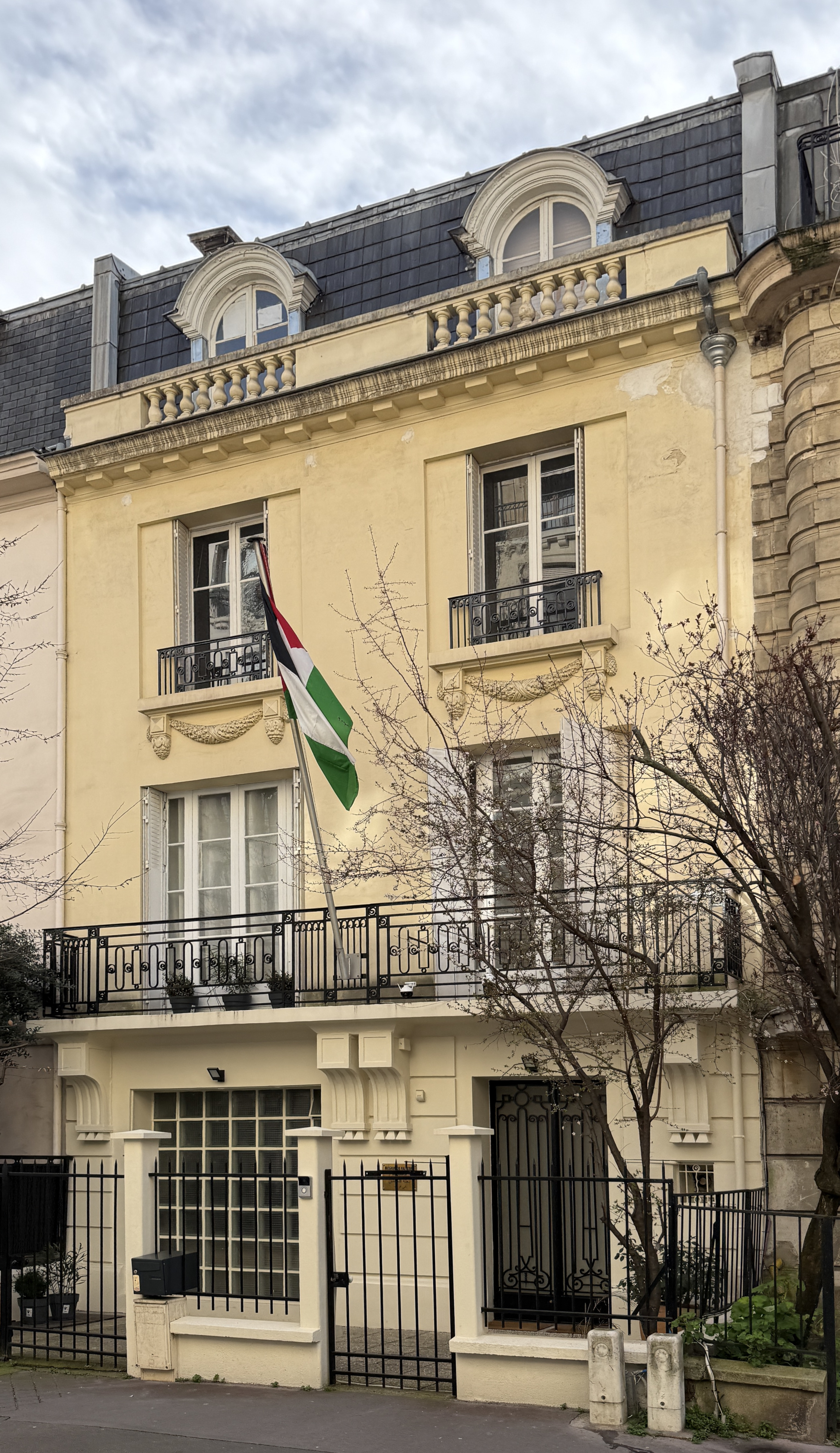
Embassy in Paris

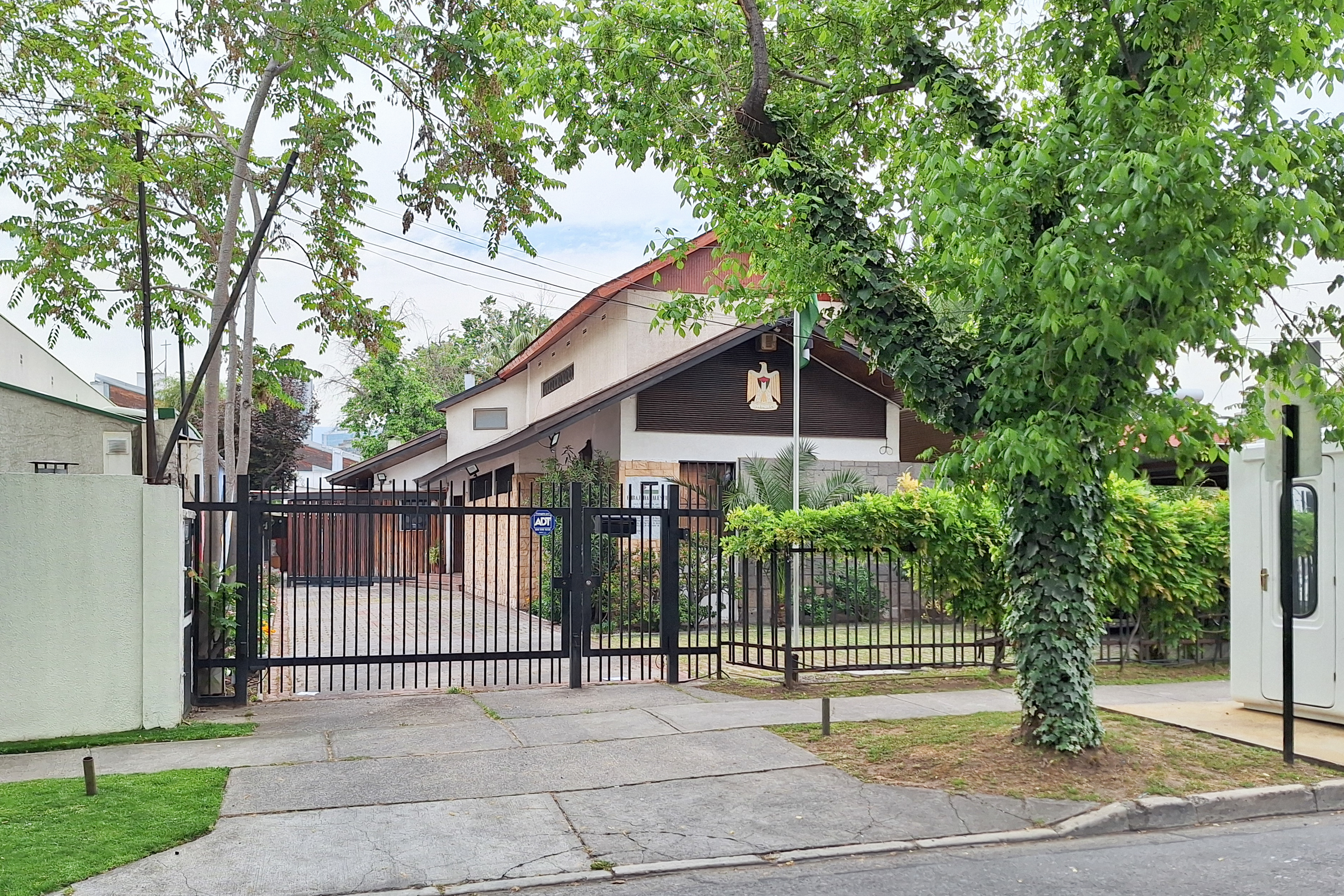
Embassy in Santiago de Chile

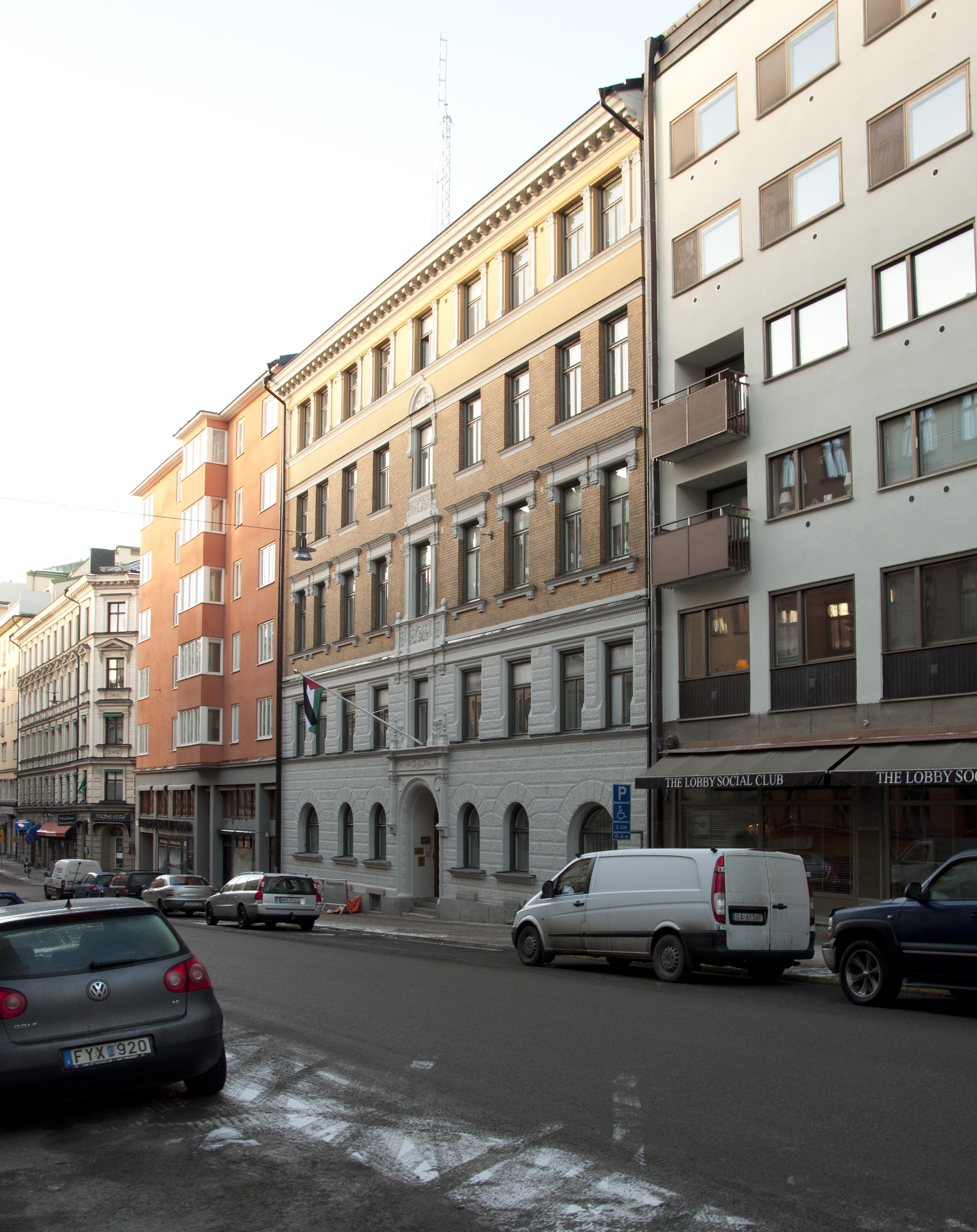
Embassy in Stockholm

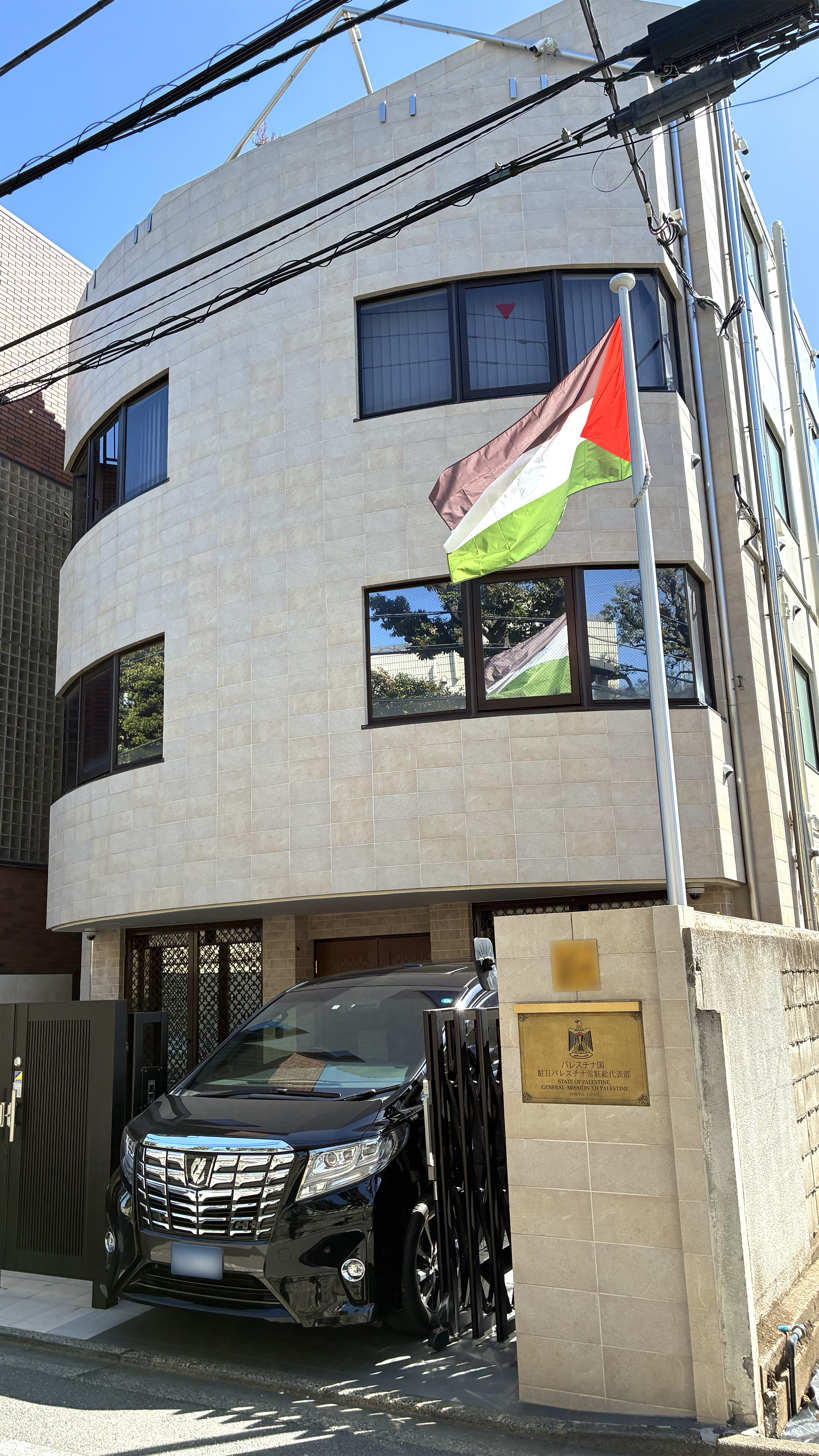
General Mission of Palestine in Tokyo

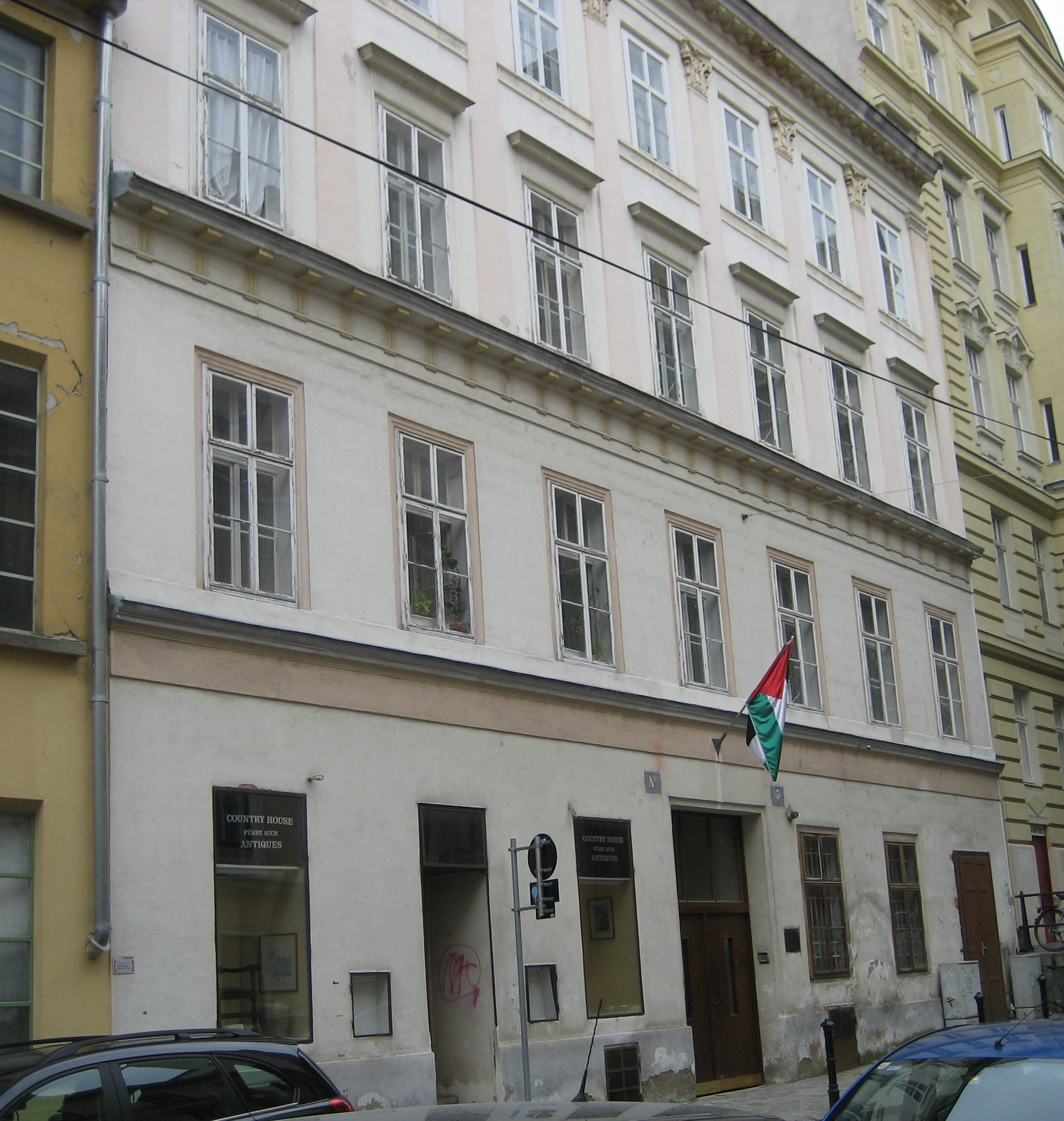
Mission in Vienna

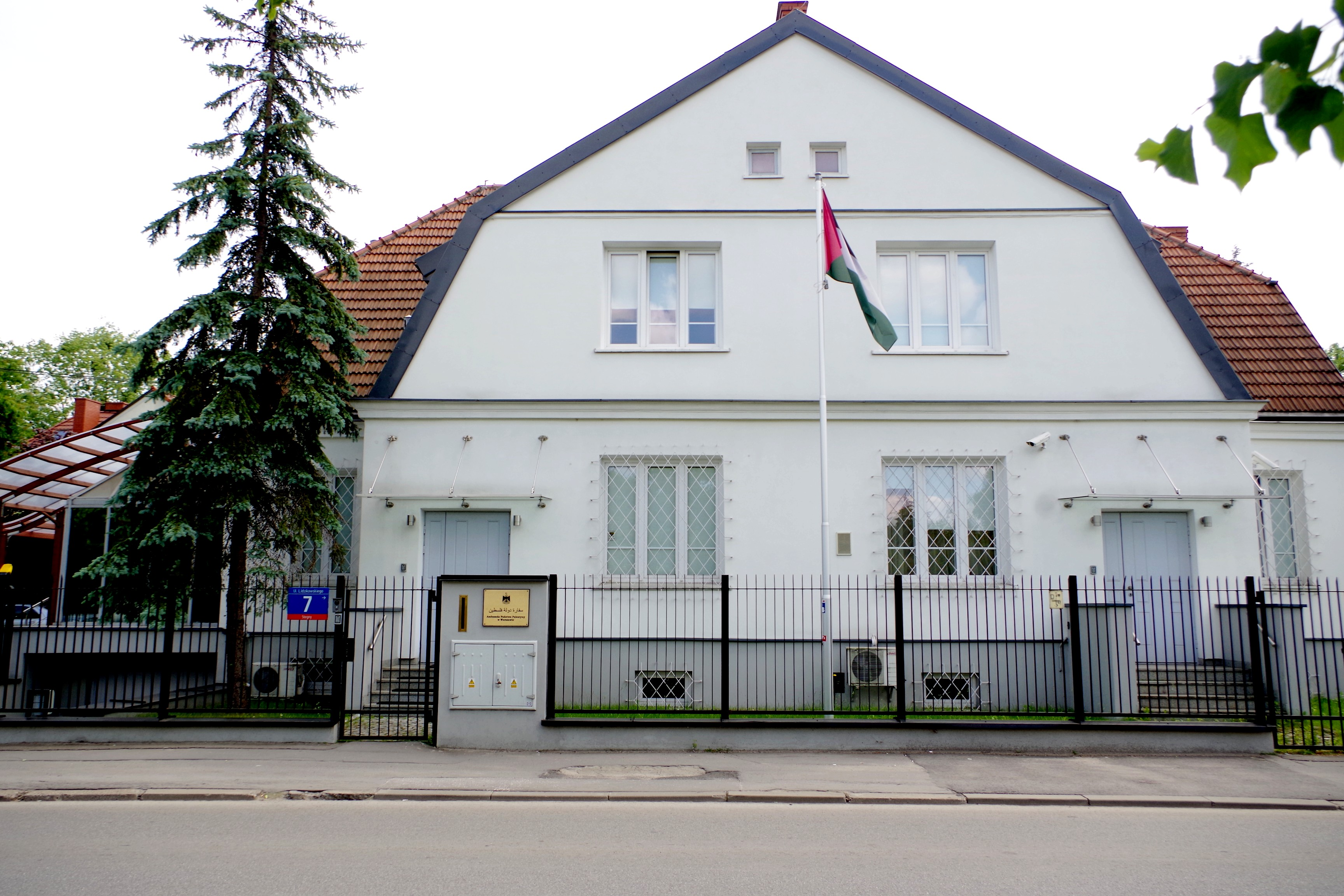
Embassy in Warsaw

== See also ==
- Foreign relations of Palestine
- List of diplomatic missions in Palestine
