= Palestine–Tunisia relations =

Diplomatic relations between the State of Palestine and Tunisia

- Palestine: Tunisia

Tunisian President Habib Bourguiba had a keen interest in finding a resolution to the Palestinian conflict. He put forth a suggestion to establish a two-state solution based on the pre-1923 boundaries of the former Mandatory Palestine, encompassing Jordan as well. After the defeat of the Palestine Liberation Organization in the 1982 Lebanon War, Tunisia received the Palestinian leadership, including Arafat. They left in 1994 after the Oslo Accords. In October 1985, the Israeli Air Force launched Operation Wooden Leg in Tunis, which led to many deaths including among Tunisian civilians. Three years later, it assassinated the senior leader, Abu Jihad, in a targeted killing operation.

== Embassy ==
The Embassy of the State of Palestine in Tunisia (Arabic: سفارة دولة فلسطين لدى تونس) is the diplomatic mission of the State of Palestine in Tunisia. It is located in Hakim Conseil Street in Tunis. The new building was inaugurated in a ceremony attended by Palestine's President Mahmoud Abbas and Tunia's President Kais Saied in 2021. The construction was undertaken by the Tunisian company Bouzguenda Frères, and consist of two buildings, one for the embassy, and the other a private Ambassador's residence, and drew upon the architectural style of Bayt al-Maqdis (Jerusalem). Outside the embassy, there is a 4.5 metres (15 ft) high statue of a resisting Palestinian woman, created by Tunisian artists with the support of Tunisia's Ministry of Culture.

== See also ==
- List of diplomatic missions in Tunisia
- List of diplomatic missions of Palestine
