= Jamal Al Shobaki =

Palestinian politician and diplomat

Jamal Al Shobaki جمال الشوبكي
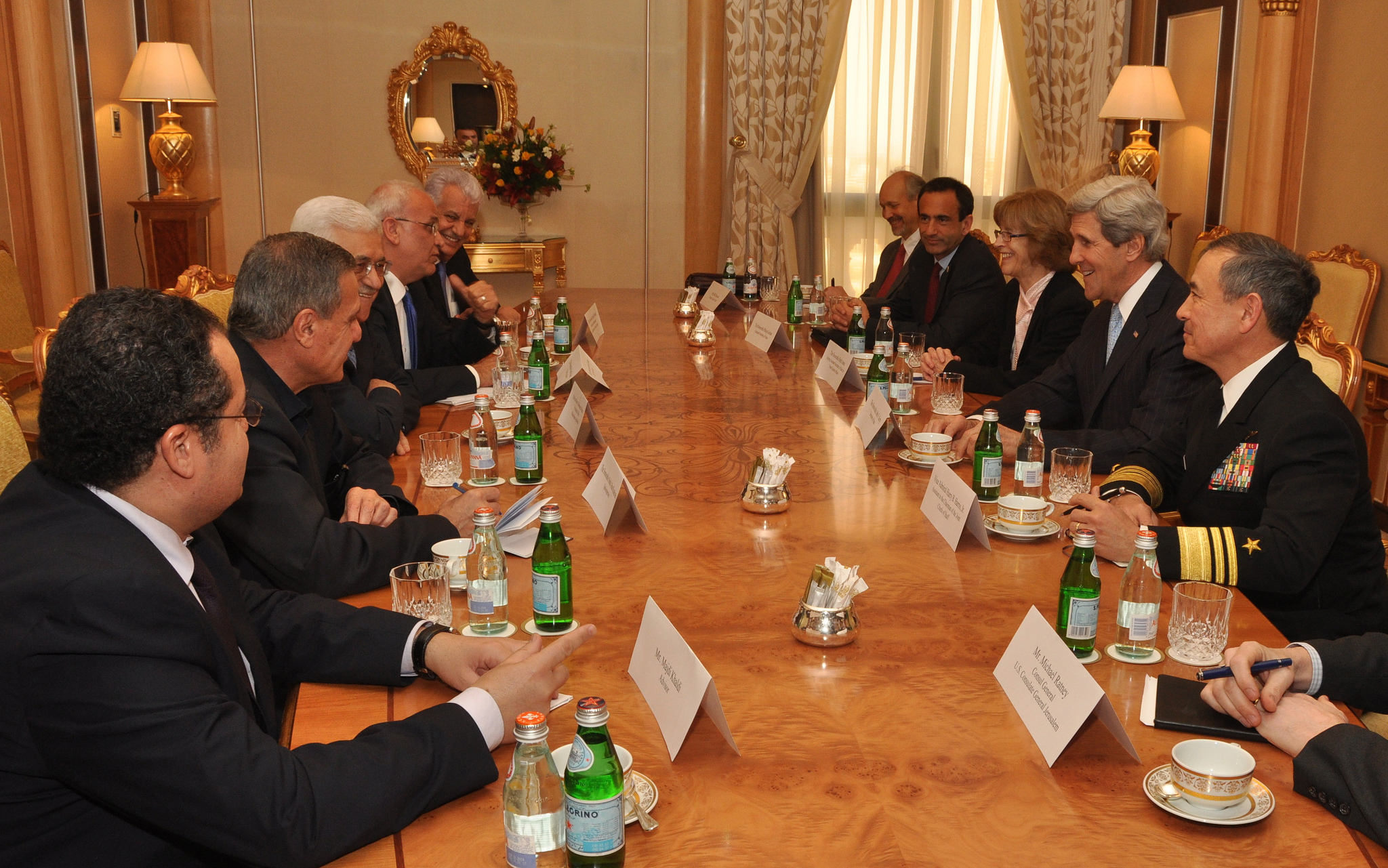

Palestinian Ambassador to Morocco
- Incumbent
- Assumed office 26 January 2018

Palestinian Ambassador to Saudi Arabia
- In office 2006–2013

Palestinian Ambassador to Egypt
- In office 2014–2017

Personal details
- Born: Jamal Abdul Latif Saleh Al Shobaki; 1952 (age 73–74) Idhna

Jamal Abdul Latif Saleh Al Shobaki, (Arabic: جمال عبد اللطيف صالح الشوبكي; Born on 1952 in the city of Idhna) is a Palestinian politician, diplomat and member of Fatah.

== Life ==
Al Shobaki was born in the town of Idhna in the Hebron Governorate during the Jordanian annexation of the West Bank to a Palestinian family who immigrated from the village of Beit Jibreen (destroyed during the 1948 war) in the Hebron district. He holds a BA in Geography from Beirut Arab University.

In 1996, Shobaki won 24,346 votes in the Palestinian general elections and became a member of the Palestinian Legislative Council.

He was appointed Minister of Local Government in Palestinian Authority Government of April 2003. He was then appointed Minister of Youth and Sports and Local Government in Palestinian Authority Government of October 2003 and Minister of Local Government in Palestinian Authority Government of November 2003.

He was a member of the Palestinian Revolutionary Council between 2009 and 2016.

Al Shobaki was ambassador to Saudi Arabia between 2006 and 2013 and ambassador to Egypt between 2014 and 2017. He was later appointed ambassador of the State of Palestine to Morocco. On 26 January 2018, he presented his official credentials to the Moroccan King Mohammed VI.

== See also ==
- Morocco–State of Palestine relations
- Embassy of the State of Palestine in Morocco
