= Embassy of Palestine, Rabat =

Embassy of the State of Palestine in Morocco سفارة دولة فلسطين لدى المغرب
- Location: Rabat
- Ambassador: Jamal Al Shobaki

Embassy of the State of Palestine in Morocco (Arabic: سفارة دولة فلسطين لدى المغرب) is the diplomatic mission of Palestine in Morocco. It is located in Rabat.

== See also ==
- List of diplomatic missions in Morocco.
- List of diplomatic missions of Palestine.
