= Embassy of Palestine, Beirut =

Embassy of Palestine in Lebanon سفارة فلسطين في الجمهورية اللبنانية
- Location: Beirut
- Address: Adnan al-Hakim Street
- Ambassador: Mohamed El-Assaad
- Website: palembassylb.com

The Embassy of Palestine in Beirut (Arabic: سفارة فلسطين في الجمهورية اللبنانية) is the diplomatic mission of the Palestine in Lebanon. It is located at Adnan al-Hakim Street in Beirut. The current ambassador is Mohamed El-Assaad who was appointed in 2025

== Ambassadors ==
Year of appointment	Ambassador
1964	Shafiq al-Hout
2006	Abbas Zaki
2009	Ashraf Dabbour
2010	Abdullah Abdullah
2011	Ashraf Dabbour
2025	Mohamed El-Assaad

== See also ==
- List of diplomatic missions in Lebanon
- List of diplomatic missions of Palestine
