= General Delegation of Palestine, Berlin =

Embassy of Palestine in Berlin

General Delegation of the State of Palestine in the Federal Republic of Germany سفارة دولة فلسطين لدى ألمانيا
- Location: Berlin
- Address: Hundekehlestraße 26a, Grunewald, Charlottenburg-Wilmersdorf, Berlin
- Ambassador: Laith Arafeh
- Website: www.palaestina.org

The General Delegation of the State of Palestine in the Federal Republic of Germany (Arabic: سفارة دولة فلسطين لدى ألمانيا) is the diplomatic mission of the Palestine in Germany in the absence of fully normalized relations. It is located in Berlin. The German Democratic Republic (GDR, East Germany) recognized the State of Palestine in 1988 prior to the German reunification in 1990 with West Germany. It was only recently upgraded to a diplomatic mission from a representative office as part of the normalization of relations between the two countries. As of 15 March 2022, Laith Arafeh is the Palestinian Ambassador to the Federal Republic of Germany and Head of the Palestine Mission in Berlin.

== See also ==
- List of diplomatic missions in Germany
- List of diplomatic missions of Palestine
