= Nayef bin Bandar Al Sudairi =

Saudi Arabian diplomat (born 1963)

Ambassador of Saudi Arabia to the State of Palestine
- Incumbent
- Assumed office 12 August 2023

Counsel General of Saudi Arabia to Jerusalem
- Incumbent
- Assumed office 12 August 2023

Ambassador of Saudi Arabia to Jordan
- Incumbent
- Assumed office January 2020

Ambassador of Saudi Arabia to Canada
- In office 2014 – August 2018

Personal details
- Born: 21 January 1963 (age 62) Riyadh, Saudi Arabia
- Parent: Bandar bin Ahmad Al Sudairi (father)

Nayef bin Bandar Al Sudairi (Arabic: نايف بن بندر السديري; born 21 January 1963) is a Saudi Arabian diplomat. He was the ambassador of Saudi Arabia to Canada between 2014 and 2018. He is the Saudi Arabian ambassador to Jordan. In addition, he was appointed non-resident ambassador of Saudi Arabia to the State of Palestine and consul-general in Jerusalem on 13 August 2023.

== Early life and education ==
Al Sudairi was born in Riyadh on 21 January 1963. His father, Bandar, is the son of Ahmad Al Sudairi. He received a master's degree in political science.

== Career ==
Al Sudairi joined the Ministry of Foreign Affairs in 1996 and worked in the permanent mission of Saudi Arabia to the United Nations (UN) from 1997. He headed a group on nuclear disarmament and non-proliferation which was attached to the Disarmament Commission of the UN between 2012 and 2014. He was appointed ambassador of Saudi Arabia to Canada in 2014 which he held until August 2018 when he was recalled by the Saudi government due to the tensions between two countries.

Al Sudairi was appointed ambassador of Saudi Arabia to Jordan in January 2020. He delivered the King Salman's invitation to Syrian President Bashar Assad to attend the 32nd Arab League summit held in Jeddah, Saudi Arabia, on 19 May 2023.

In addition to his diplomatic post as Saudi Arabia's ambassador to Jordan, Al Sudairi was named as the non-resident ambassador of Saudi Arabia to the State of Palestine and consul-general in Jerusalem on 12 August 2023. The same day Majdi Al Khalidi, Palestinian President Mahmoud Abbas's diplomatic adviser, received Al Sudairi in Jordan where he submitted his credentials. Al Sudairi went to Ramallah and met with Mahmoud Abbas on 27 September being the first Saudi Arabian official visited the region since 1967.
