= Embassy of Palestine, Ankara =

Embassy of the State of Palestine in Turkey
- Address: Kılıç Ali Cd., Oran, Ankara
- Ambassador: Faed Halid Abd Mustafa

The Embassy of the State of Palestine in Ankara (Arabic: سفارة دولة فلسطين لدى تركيا; Turkish: Filistin Devleti'nin Ankara Büyükelçiliği) is the diplomatic mission of the State of Palestine in the Republic of Turkey. The embassy came to be initially as a representative office of the Palestine Liberation Organization on 5 October 1979, when Yasser Arafat visited Turkey during the tenure of Bülent Ecevit. The current ambassador is Faed Halid Abd Mustafa since May 2015.

== History ==
The first representative of the PLO in Ankara was Rıbhi Halum Hicazi. On 27 August 1987, the street where the representative office lies was named Palestine Avenue (Turkish: Filistin Caddesi). The renaming of the street was accompanied with an event hosted by the mayor of Ankara Mehmet Altınsoy along with members of diplomatic community in Ankara and the general public.

Following the Palestinian Declaration of Independence on 15 November 1988, Turkey was among fifteen other nations that formally recognized Palestine as a sovereign nation on the same day. The representative office became an embassy the next year.

The embassy moved to a new building in Oran administrative area in 2009, closer to other diplomatic missions. The municipality of Ankara named a street close to the new embassy Al-Quds Avenue (Turkish: Kudüs Caddesi).

== Former ambassadors ==
Rıbhi Halum Hicazi served as the first representative of the PLO in Ankara, and later as the ambassador until 1990. Fouad Yasin was the second ambassador until 2005. Nabil Marof served as the third ambassador until 2014. Since then, Faed Halid Abd Mustafa has been serving as the fourth ambassador of Palestine in Ankara.

== See also ==
- Palestine–Turkey relations
