= Idna =

Idna إذنا
- Municipality type B

Arabic transcription(s)
  - Arabic: إذنا
  - Latin: Idhna (non official)
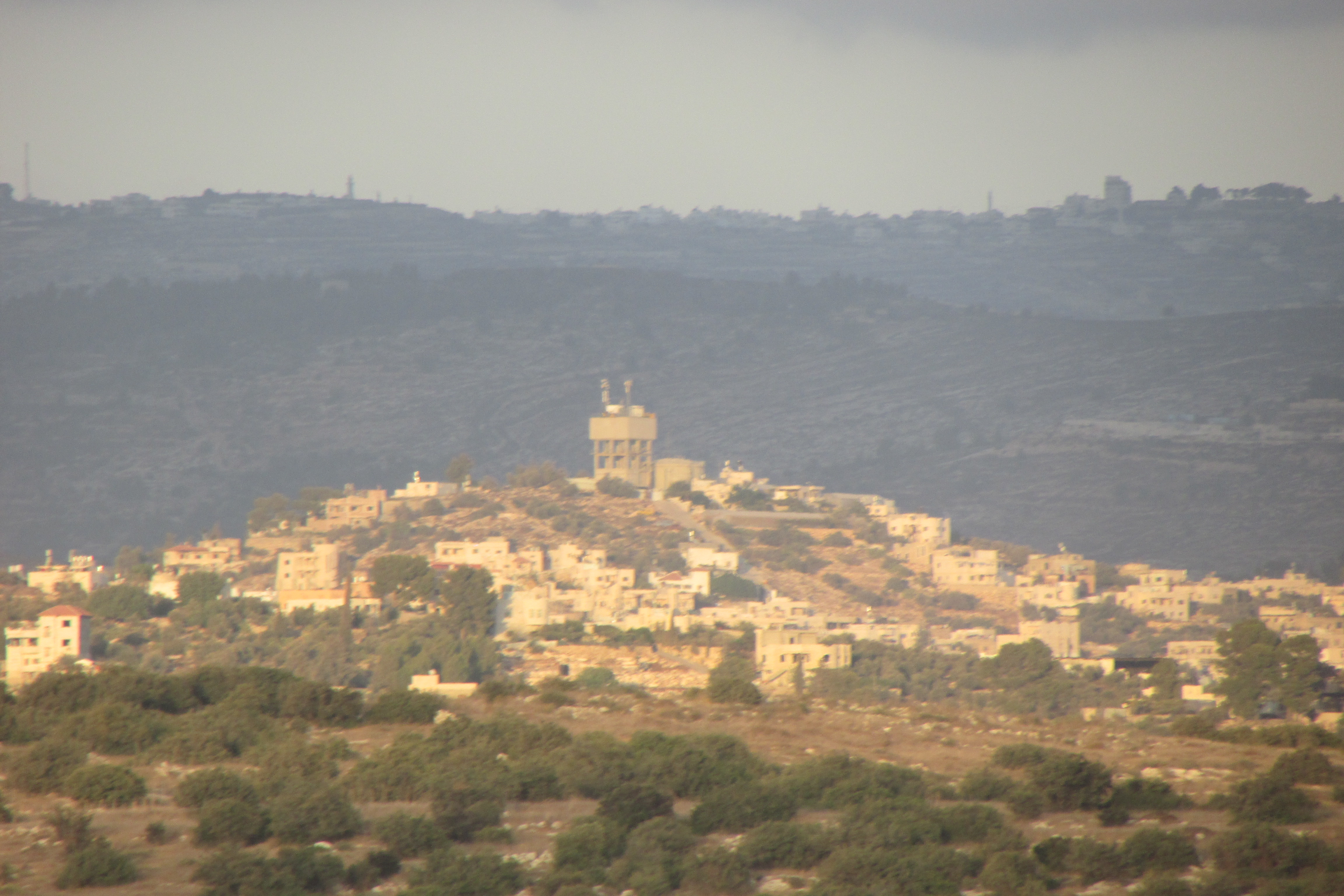
- Idna

- Location of Idna within Palestine
- Coordinates: 31°33′31″N 34°58′34″E
- Palestine grid: 147/107
- State: State of Palestine
- Governorate: Hebron

Government
  - Type: Municipality

Area
  - Total: 21.5 km^{2} (8.3 sq mi)

Population (2017)
  - Total: 26,009
  - Density: 1,210/km^{2} (3,130/sq mi)
- Name meaning: "Lower"

Idna or Idhna (Arabic: إذنا) is a Palestinian town in the southern West Bank, located in the Hebron Governorate of the State of Palestine, 13 kilometers west of Hebron and about one kilometer east of the Green Line. According to the Palestinian Central Bureau of Statistics, the town had a population of 26,009 inhabitants in 2017.

Idna is physically divided into southern and northern parts by the Wadi al-Feranj. Idna's primary source of income is agriculture and the town's total land area is 21,526 dunams (21.5 km^{2} [8.3 sq mi]), of which 2,809 dunams (2.8 km^{2} [1.1 sq mi]) are built up area. Idna is governed by a municipal council of thirteen members and six departments.

== History ==
Idna's site was inhabited since Canaanite times (the Bronze Age), evident from ancient remains found in the town. The town has been suggested being identified with the biblical city of Dannah, mentioned in the Book of Joshua (15:49) as a town of Judah.

Hebrews, Romans, Byzantines and Arabs succeeded in gaining control of the town and coins, statues, tombs and pottery dating from these various rulers were found in the town.

=== Roman period ===
Writing in the early 4th century, Eusebius mentioned a village named Iedna as being six miles from Eleutheropolis on the road to Hebron.

In 2018, a set of Roman-era tombs from the first century CE, when the region was part of Roman-controlled Judaea, was found in Idna.

=== Mamluk period ===
Palestine became part of the Mamluk empire in 1260. In February 1262, the Mamluk sultan Baybars endowed Idna, then an inhabited village, to the Ibrahimi Mosque (Cave of the Patriarchs) in Hebron. A document related to this waqf, dated to the first decade of the 14th century, mentions a blood money settlement, overseen by the qadi of Hebron, by two brothers from the Halaf (or Jalaf) clan of Idna to three brothers of the Banu Rabi'a clan of Dura. The Idna brothers had been accused of killing a fourth brother of the Dura men.

=== Ottoman period ===
Idna was incorporated into the Ottoman Empire in 1517 with all of Palestine. An Ottoman fiscal source from c. 1525–1528 mentions Idna among the villages whose residents had scattered. By 1596 the village appeared in the tax registers as being in the nahiya (subdistrict) of Hebron in the liwa of Jerusalem. It had a population of 68 households, all Muslim. They paid a fixed tax rate of 33.3% on agricultural products, including wheat, barley, olives, vineyards, fruit trees, goats and/or beehives; a total of 19,000 akçe. All of the revenue went to a waqf.

Edward Robinson, who visited Idna in 1838, recorded that the town's two parts were led by a sheikh and the inhabitants of each part followed and backed their respective sheikh in internal quarrels. Adjacent to Idna are the ruins of the original village which is totally covered by cultivable fields. Tesserae (mosaic stones) were found on the site. Idna was further noted as a Muslim village located between the mountains and the plain of Gaza, but subject to the government of el-Khuhlil.

According to historian Roy Marom,

By the second half of the nineteenth century, in tandem with the Ottoman Land code reforms which allocated abandoned lands to inhabited villages, Idhna absorbed Bayt 'Alām, Bayt al-Bān, Tayyibat al-Ism, Umm al-Jamājim and other sites, covering 34 km2 of land. Idhna's residents held possession of the miri (state owned) lands [...] in common [...]. Cultivation of each plot was rotated between Idhna's six main clans on a bi-annual basis. Because of the distance of the lands from Idhna, residents established seasonal quarters among Idhna's khirab (ruined/temporary sites). [....] Negev nomads from the Jubārāt, Ramādīn, and Wuhaydī tribes also frequented the area in times of drought.

Victor Guérin visited Idna in June 1863 and described a village with almost 500 inhabitants, divided into two districts, each ruled by a sheikh. Many houses, especially a small Bordj, had substructures of stone, which, to all appearances, were dating back to antiquity. An Ottoman village list of about 1870 showed that Idna had 22 houses and a population of 108, though the population count included only men. In 1883 the PEF's Survey of Western Palestine (SWP) described Idna as "a small village on the south slope of a hill [ ] divided by a small depression into two." The SWP further found that near the town were several large caves with niches for lamps or skulls.

=== British Mandate era ===
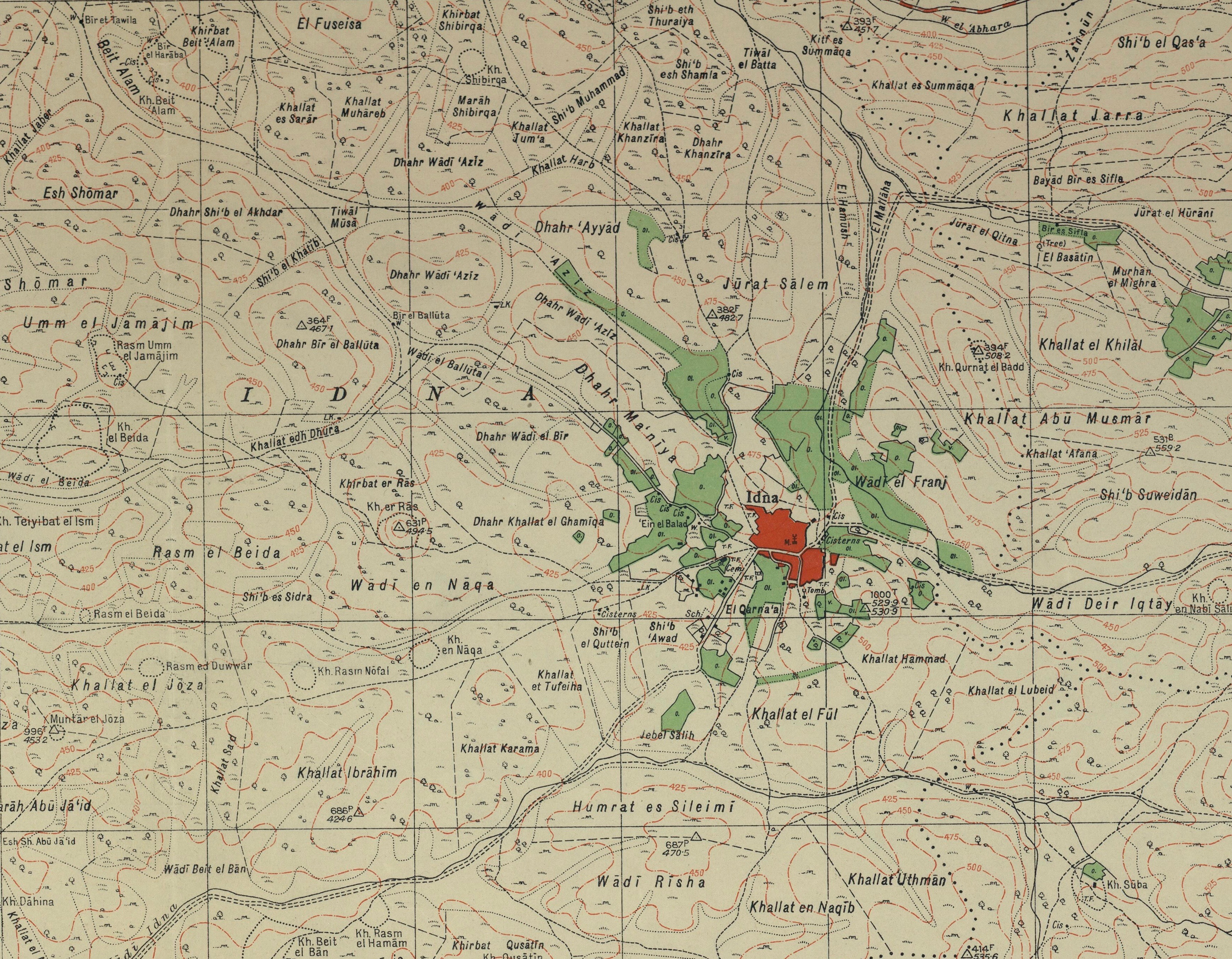
Idna 1933 1:20,000

In the 1922 census of Palestine, conducted by the British Mandate authorities, Idna had a population of 1,300, all Muslim, increasing in the 1931 census to 1,719, still all Muslim, in 317 houses. Idhna’s inscreasing population reflects the demographic transition resulting from improved health care and food security.

In the 1945 statistics the population of Idna was 2,190, all Muslims, who owned 34,002 dunams of land according to an official land and population survey. 528 dunams were plantations and irrigable land, 14,481 for cereals, while 153 dunams were built-up (urban) land.

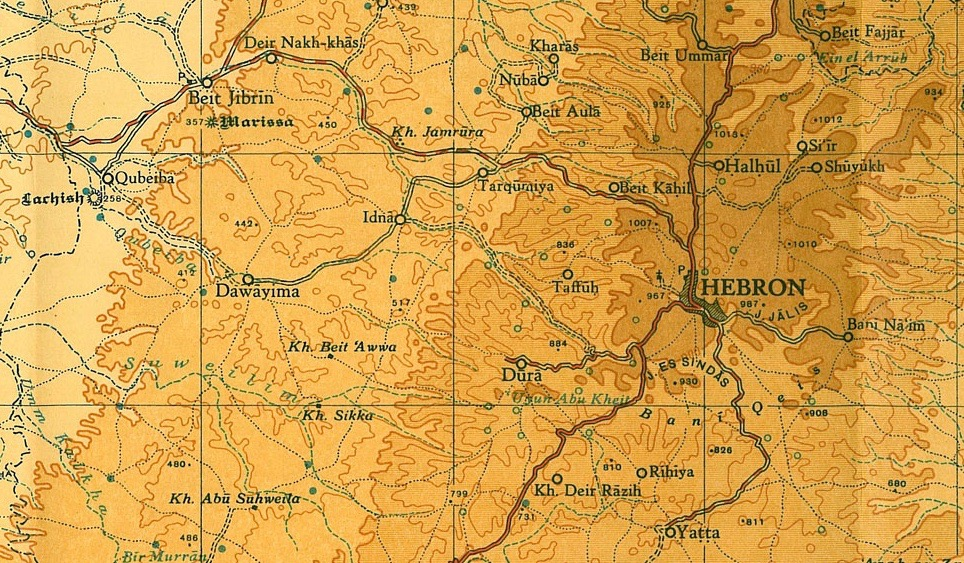
Idna 1945 1:250,000

=== Jordanian era ===
In the wake of the 1948 Arab–Israeli War, and after the 1949 Armistice Agreements, Idna came under Jordanian rule.

The Jordanian census of 1961 recorded 3,568 inhabitants in Idna.

=== 1967, aftermath ===
Since the Six-Day War in 1967, Idna has been under Israeli occupation. The population in the 1967 census conducted by the Israeli authorities was 3,713.

Since 1995, Idna has been governed by the Palestinian National Authority as part of Area B of the West Bank. Today, the population is wholly Muslim.

== Bibliography ==
- Barron, J.B., ed. (1923). Palestine: Report and General Abstracts of the Census of 1922. Government of Palestine.
- Bromiley, G.W. (1979). The International Standard Bible Encyclopedia: E-J. Wm. B. Eerdmans Publishing. ISBN 0-8028-3781-6.
- Conder, C.R.; Kitchener, H.H. (1883). The Survey of Western Palestine: Memoirs of the Topography, Orography, Hydrography, and Archaeology. Vol. 3. London: Committee of the Palestine Exploration Fund.
- Government of Jordan, Department of Statistics (1964). First Census of Population and Housing. Volume I: Final Tables; General Characteristics of the Population (PDF).
- Government of Palestine, Department of Statistics (1945). Village Statistics, April, 1945.
- Guérin, V. (1869). Description Géographique Historique et Archéologique de la Palestine (in French). Vol. 1: Judee, pt. 2. Paris: L'Imprimerie Nationale.
- Hadawi, S. (1970). Village Statistics of 1945: A Classification of Land and Area ownership in Palestine. Palestine Liberation Organization Research Center.
- Hartmann, M. (1883). "Die Ortschaftenliste des Liwa Jerusalem in dem türkischen Staatskalender für Syrien auf das Jahr 1288 der Flucht (1871)". Zeitschrift des Deutschen Palästina-Vereins. 6: 102–149.
- Hütteroth, W.-D.; Abdulfattah, K. (1977). Historical Geography of Palestine, Transjordan and Southern Syria in the Late 16th Century. Erlanger Geographische Arbeiten, Sonderband 5. Erlangen, Germany: Vorstand der Fränkischen Geographischen Gesellschaft. ISBN 3-920405-41-2.
- Mills, E., ed. (1932). Census of Palestine 1931. Population of Villages, Towns and Administrative Areas. Jerusalem: Government of Palestine.
- Rapoport, Yossef (2025). Becoming Arab: The Formation of Arab Identity in the Medieval Middle East. Princeton: Princeton University Press. ISBN 9780691210636.
- Palmer, E.H. (1881). The Survey of Western Palestine: Arabic and English Name Lists Collected During the Survey by Lieutenants Conder and Kitchener, R. E. Transliterated and Explained by E.H. Palmer. Committee of the Palestine Exploration Fund.
- Robinson, E.; Smith, E. (1841). Biblical Researches in Palestine, Mount Sinai and Arabia Petraea: A Journal of Travels in the year 1838. Vol. 2. Boston: Crocker & Brewster.
- Robinson, E.; Smith, E. (1841). Biblical Researches in Palestine, Mount Sinai and Arabia Petraea: A Journal of Travels in the year 1838. Vol. 3. Boston: Crocker & Brewster.
- Robinson, E.; Smith, E. (1856). Biblical Researches in Palestine and the Adjacent Regions. Vol. 2. Boston: Crocker and Brewster.
- Socin, A. (1879). "Alphabetisches Verzeichniss von Ortschaften des Paschalik Jerusalem". Zeitschrift des Deutschen Palästina-Vereins. 2: 135–163.
