= Embassy of Palestine, Stockholm =

Diplomatic mission of the State of Palestine to Sweden

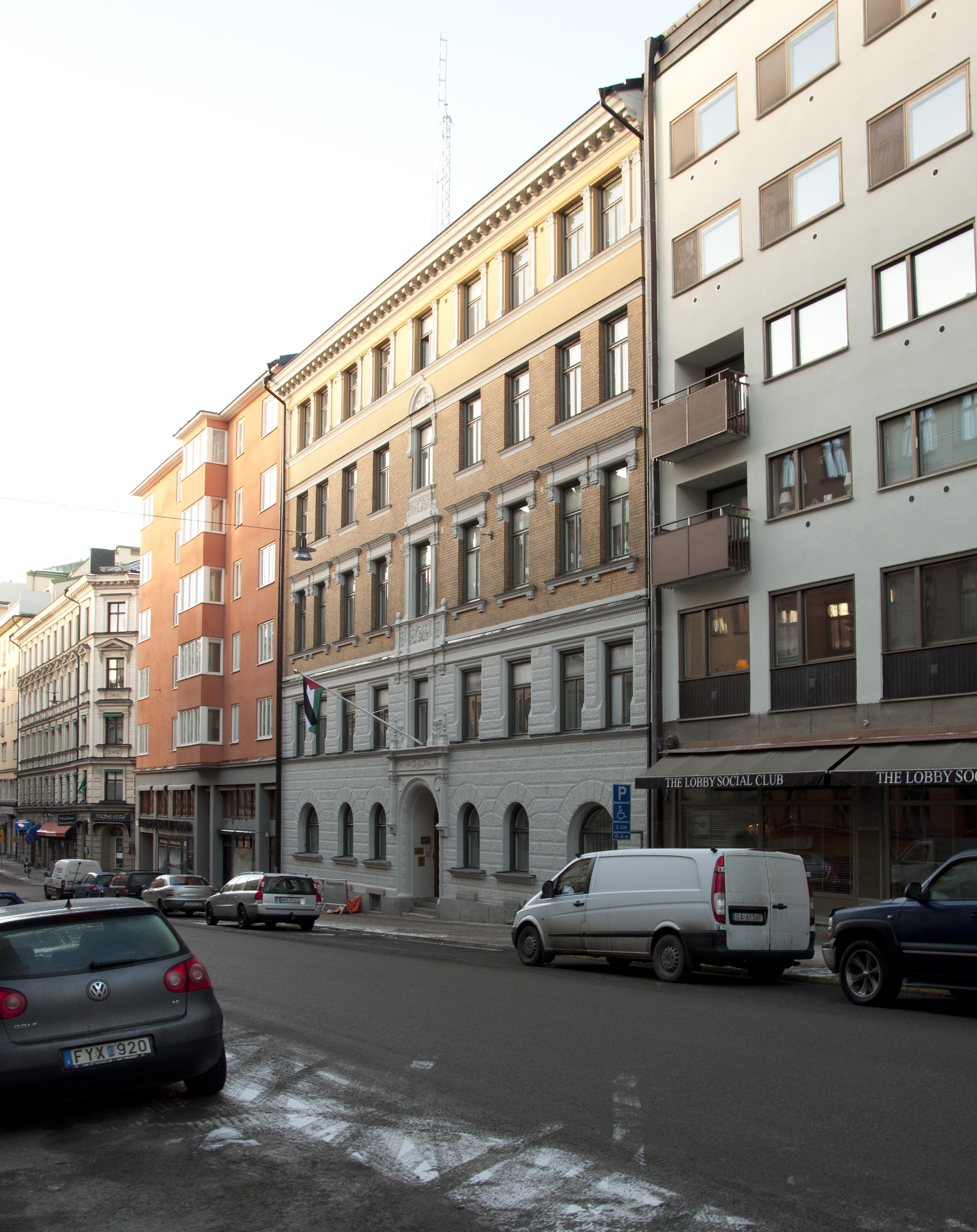
- Location: Stockholm, Sweden
- Address: Rådmansgatan 48, Stockholm
- Coordinates: 59°20′27.7″N 18°3′38.4″E
- Ambassador: Rula Al Mhaissen
- Website: https://palestineembassy.se/

The Embassy of Palestine in Stockholm (Arabic: السفارة الفلسطينية في ستوكهولم) is the diplomatic mission of the State of Palestine in Sweden. Its formal opening on February 10, 2015, during Mahmoud Abbas's official visit to Stockholm marked the first time a Palestinian embassy had ever opened in a Western European nation.

== See also ==
- List of diplomatic missions of Palestine
- List of diplomatic missions in Sweden
