= List of ambassadors of Spain to Israel =

Ambassador of Spain to Israel
- Coat of arms of Spain
- Incumbent; Vacant since 11 March 2026
- Ministry of Foreign Affairs; Secretariat of State for Foreign Affairs
- Style: The Most Excellent
- Residence: Tel Aviv
- Nominator: The Foreign Minister
- Appointer: The Monarch
- Term length: At the government's pleasure
- Inaugural holder: Pedro López Aguirrebengoa
- Formation: 1986
- Website: Mission of Spain to Israel

The ambassador of Spain to Israel is the official representative of the Kingdom of Spain to the State of Israel. Since the ambassador's recall in September 2025, Francisca María Pedrós Carretero, chargé d'affaires a.i., has managed the diplomatic relations in Tel Aviv.

The first contacts between the two countries took place as early as 1949. Spain, under the dictatorship of Francisco Franco, was seeking allies to gain entry into the United Nations, something that Israel was not interested in at the time. Israel initially accused Spain of collaborating with Nazi Germany and selling arms to Arab countries. With two completely opposing positions and no possibility of agreement, Spain continued its policy of rapprochement with the Arab nations.

Later, in the mid-1950s, Israel adopted a more pragmatic attitude and attempted some contacts, but by then Spain had already consolidated its relationship with the United States, allowing it to join the United Nations in 1955, preventing any rapprochement between the two nations. Maurice L. Perlzweig attempted to achieve a rapprochement between 1958 and 1959, but the dictatorship remained immovable in its position. Despite this, in the 1960s, Spanish diplomatic missions mediated with these Arab countries, helping thousands of Jews emigrate to Israel and secure their liberation during the conflict known as the Six-Day War.

Following the accession of Juan Carlos I to the throne in 1975, the Jewish communities found an ally in the king, who fostered contacts with Jews. Thus, the monarch received a delegation from the World Sephardi Federation, as well as representatives of the Jewish communities of major Spanish cities. Although the Count of Motrico had received the green light to establish diplomatic relations, the resignation of the government in mid-1976 interrupted the plans. New attempts were made later, but domestic politics and conflicts in the Middle East delayed normalization. However, the Spanish government suddenly initiated contacts in January 1986, quickly reaching an agreement.

Spain and Israel established diplomatic relations on 17 January 1986, with an exchange of notes in The Hague between Máximo Cajal López, Spain's Secretary-General for Foreign Policy, and Yeshayahu Arung, Deputy Director at Israeli Ministry of Foreign Affairs. Although Spain recognized the new Jewish state, it did not recognize its full sovereignty over Jerusalem. The joint statement between the two countries expressly stated that the establishment of diplomatic relations between the two countries "will in no way affect the status of the Consulate General of Spain in Jerusalem". The first ambassadors were appointed between January and February 1986.

Although relations between the two countries have always been tense, they deteriorated definitively following the Gaza war of 2024. Spain believes Israel's response to the October 7 attacks was too harsh, calling it genocide and recognizing the State of Palestine in May 2024. That same month, Israel recalled its ambassador to Madrid, and Spain did the same in September 2025.

== List of ambassadors ==
Ambassador		Term	Nominated by	Appointed by	Accredited to
1	Pedro López de Aguirrebengoa	13 February 1986 – 28 October 1992 (6 years, 258 days)	Francisco Fernández Ordóñez	Juan Carlos I	Chaim Herzog
2	José Luis Crespo de Vega	29 October 1992 – 29 June 1996 (3 years, 244 days)	Javier Solana	Juan Carlos I	Chaim Herzog
3	Miguel Ángel Moratinos	29 June 1996 – 4 December 1996 (158 days)	Abel Matutes	Juan Carlos I	Ezer Weizman
4	Fermín Zelada Jurado	22 February 1997 – 13 January 2001 (3 years, 326 days)	Abel Matutes	Juan Carlos I	Ezer Weizman
5	Carlos Bárcena Portolés	13 January 2001 – 8 November 2003 (2 years, 299 days)	Josep Piqué	Juan Carlos I	Moshe Katsav
6	Eudaldo Mirapeix y Martínez	21 November 2003 – 5 July 2008 (4 years, 227 days)	Ana Palacio	Juan Carlos I	Moshe Katsav
7	Álvaro Iranzo Gutiérrez	5 July 2008 – 12 May 2012 (3 years, 312 days)	Miguel Ángel Moratinos	Juan Carlos I	Shimon Peres
8	Fernando Carderera Soler	12 May 2012 – 25 March 2017 (4 years, 317 days)	José Manuel García-Margallo	Juan Carlos I	Shimon Peres
9	Manuel Gómez-Acebo Rodríguez-Spiteri	25 March 2017 – 21 July 2021 (4 years, 118 days)	Alfonso Dastis	Felipe VI	Reuven Rivlin
10	Ana María Salomón Pérez	21 July 2021 – 11 March 2026 (Note: Recalled since September 2025.) (4 years, 233 days)	José Manuel Albares	Felipe VI	Isaac Herzog
-	Francisca María Pedrós Carretero	Charge d'affaires a.i.			

== See also ==
- Israel–Spain relations
- Palestine–Spain relations

== Bibliography ==
- Marquina Barrio, Antonio (1986). "La normalización de relaciones diplomáticas entre España e Israel" [The normalization of diplomatic relations between Spain and Israel] (PDF). Revista de estudios internacionales (in Spanish) (7): 1133–1143. ISSN 0210-9794. Archived (PDF) from the original on 16 October 2025 – via Centre for Political and Constitutional Studies.
