= Husni Abdel Wahed =

Palestinian journalist, politician and diplomat

- حسني عبد الواحد
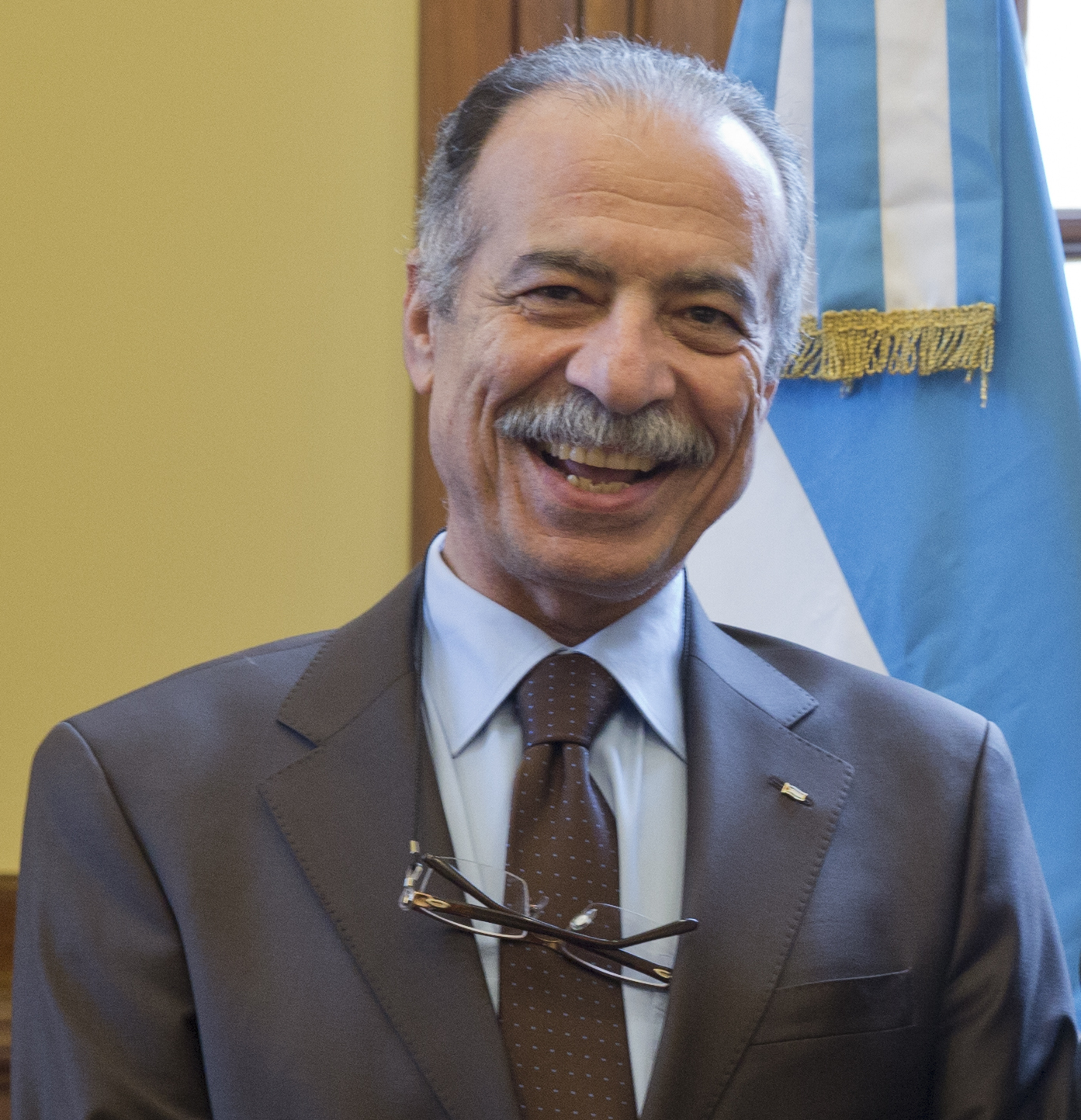

Ambassador of Palestine to Spain
- Incumbent
- Assumed office 16 September 2024
- President: Mahmoud Abbas
- Preceded by: Musa Odeh

Ambassador of Palestine to Argentina
- In office 5 March 2015 – 30 December 2021
- Preceded by: Walid Muaqqat
- Succeeded by: Riyad Alhalabi

Personal details
- Born: January 1, 1960 (age 66) Aqabat Jaber, Jericho Governorate, Jordanian annexation of the West Bank
- Education: University of Havana

Husni Muhammad Ahmed Abdel Wahed (Arabic: حسني محمد أحمد عبد الواحد; born January 1, 1960) is a Palestinian journalist, politician and diplomat. He served as the Ambassador of the State of Palestine to Argentina from 5 March 2015 until December 2021. He currently holds the position of Ambassador of the State of Palestine to the Kingdom of Spain.

== Early life and education ==
Hosni Abdel Wahed was born on 1 January 1960, in Aqabat Jaber camp in Jericho Governorate, east of the West Bank, to a Palestinian family displaced by the Nakba from the village of Al-Tira, near the city of Lod. After the events of the Six Day War in 1967, his family immigrated to another camp in Jordan, where he finished his school education. He left for Bulgaria where he obtained a diploma in social sciences, then to Cuba where he obtained bachelor's and master's degrees in journalism from the University of Havana.

== Career ==
Abdel Wahed worked as a journalist for Balsam magazine. He also worked as a coordinator of Arab culture for a few years in Santiago, and then as an advisor to the Education Department of the Palestine Liberation Organization.

His political career began in the Europe Department of the General Administration for Diaspora Palestinians within the Palestinian Ministry of Planning and International Cooperation, then he assumed the presidency of the Latin America Department.

Later he was Assistant Deputy Minister of Foreign Affairs, then Director General for the Arab World at the Ministry of Foreign Affairs, Minister Counselor at the embassies of the State of Palestine in Venezuela and Mexico, and Director General for Administrative and Financial Affairs at the Ministry of Foreign Affairs.

In February 2015, he was appointed Ambassador of the State of Palestine in Buenos Aires to Argentina, states, being officially accredited on March 5, and served until 2021.

In September 2015, he visited the towns of Villa María and La Palestina in the province of Córdoba . In the former, the local municipality declared him an "Honorary Guest."

In March 2022, he was appointed as head of the Diplomatic Mission of Palestine in Madrid and, after Spain's recognition of Palestine in May 2024, he was granted the status of ambassador. He presented his credentials to King Felipe VI on 16 September 2024.

== Personal life ==
Abdel Wahed is married to Amneh Abdel Wahed and has four children, two boys and two girls.
