= Walid Muaqqat =

Palestinian diplomat (born 1953)

- وليد إبراهيم المؤقت
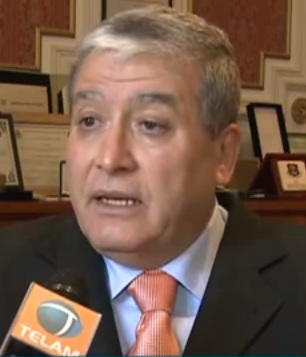
- Muaqqat in 2011

2nd Ambassador of Palestine to Peru
- Incumbent
- Assumed office April 23, 2015
- President: Mahmoud Abbas
- Preceded by: Walid Abdel Rahim

1st Ambassador of Palestine to Argentina
- In office August 2009 – March 5, 2015
- Preceded by: Himself (as PNA representative)
- Succeeded by: Husni Abdel Wahed

Ambassador of Palestine to Nicaragua
- In office January 4, 2006 – July 29, 2009
- Preceded by: George Salameh
- Succeeded by: Mohamed Saadat

Chief Ambassador of the Special Mission of Palestine in Peru
- In office May 25, 2001 – December 31, 2005
- Preceded by: Himself (as Chief Ambassador of the PLO Special Delegation)
- Succeeded by: Walid Abdel Rahim

Personal details
- Born: 1953 Jerusalem
- Party: PLO
- Spouse: Maha Al Sharif
- Children: 4
- Education: Ain Shams University
- Occupation: Diplomat, politician
- Awards: See relevant section

Walid Ibrahim Muaqqat (Arabic: وليد إبراهيم المؤقت; born 1953) is a Palestinian politician and diplomat, currently serving as the Ambassador of the State of Palestine to Peru since 2015. He previously represented his country in Argentina, Nicaragua, Bolivia, Ecuador and Uruguay, either on behalf of the State of Palestine, the Palestinian National Authority or the Palestine Liberation Organization (PLO).

== Early life ==
Muaqqat was born in Jerusalem during the Jordanian annexation of the West Bank and completed his secondary education in Jericho. He graduated from the Ain Shams University Faculty of Law in Cairo, Egypt. Muaqqat is a member of the PLO since his youth.

== Diplomatic career ==
In 1979 he served as Second Secretary in the PLO Office in Peru. In 1985 he was appointed First Secretary in the PLO Mission in Bolivia. In 1987 he served as Counselor at the Palestinian Embassy in Nicaragua. The following year he assumed the position of Deputy Representative in the PLO Representation in Peru. On May 14, 1998 he was appointed as Chief Ambassador of the PLO Special Delegation in Peru. That same year he signed the Agreement establishing diplomatic relations between Palestine and Ecuador, being appointed concurrent Ambassador based in Lima.

On May 25, 2001, he began his activities as Chief Ambassador of the Special Mission of Palestine in Peru until December 31, 2005. On January 4, 2006, he was appointed as Ambassador Extraordinary and Plenipotentiary of the State of Palestine to the Republic of Nicaragua until July 29, 2009, when he was appointed representative of the Palestine mission to Argentina in August of the same year. At the same time, he was also appointed concurrent Palestinian Ambassador to Uruguay.

At the time of beginning his activities as ambassador in Argentina, Muaqqat stated that the then Minister of Foreign Affairs of Israel, Avigdor Lieberman, had endorsed "the occupation of the Malvinas [Falkland] Islands, when he compared the Israeli occupation in Palestine with that of the English in Argentina."

On December 6, 2010, the Argentine government officially recognised the "free and independent" State of Palestine, with Muaqqat becoming the first Palestinian ambassador of in Buenos Aires. During his tenure as ambassador, a Free Trade Agreement was also signed between Mercosur and Palestine. Inter-city cooperation agreements were also carried out between Argentine cities and Palestinian cities, and a Permanent Committee of Solidarity with the Palestinian People was created.

During the 2014 Gaza War, Muaqqat declared that Israeli actions were a "genocide" against the Palestinian people.

In mid-February 2015, he left the Palestinian embassy in Buenos Aires, being replaced by Husni Abdel Wahed. Muaqqat was given a farewell lunch on February 15 of that year by the Syrian Lebanese Club of Buenos Aires.

In April 2015, he was again appointed ambassador of the State of Palestine in Lima, Peru, and was officially accredited on April 23 of that year.

During the Gaza war, Muaqqat denounced the Israeli treatment of Palestinians, describing the Palestinian situation as one of "living under Apartheid." He also brought to attention the case of a woman from Chimbote trapped with her Palestinian husband and three children in the Gaza Strip.

== Awards ==
In 2004, he received recognition and a medal for the Best Personalities from the College of Journalists of Peru, an ISESCO (Islamic Educational, Scientific and Cultural Organization) recognition for his collaborative work in Lima and the Mother Teresa of Calcutta Medal awarded by the "Sembrando Valores" civil society of Peru. On November 29, 2005, he received the Order of "Merit in the Diplomatic Service of Peru Jose Gregorio Paz Soldan" in the degree of Grand Cross.

On July 8, 2009, he received the Medal of the Order of Merit of the José de Marcoleta Diplomatic Service in the degree of Grand Cross from the government of Nicaragua. On July 15, he was recognised by the Autonomous University of Nicaragua in Managua "for his collaboration with the professional training of diplomacy and political science students."

In October 2014, he visited the Argentine city of Paraná in the province of Entre Ríos, where he was named an "illustrious guest" by the local municipality.

The Ministry of Foreign Affairs and Worship of Argentina awarded him the Order of the Liberator San Martín in the degree of Grand Cross.

== Personal life ==
Muaqqat is married to Maha Al Sharif and has four children.

In 2022, Muaqqat became involved in an incident with local law enforcement after reportedly parking in a handicapped parking area in an avenue in Lima, later apologising through an official communiqué.
