= Inauguration of Luis Lacalle Pou =

2020 Uruguayan presidential inauguration

Presidential Inauguration of Luis Lacalle Pou
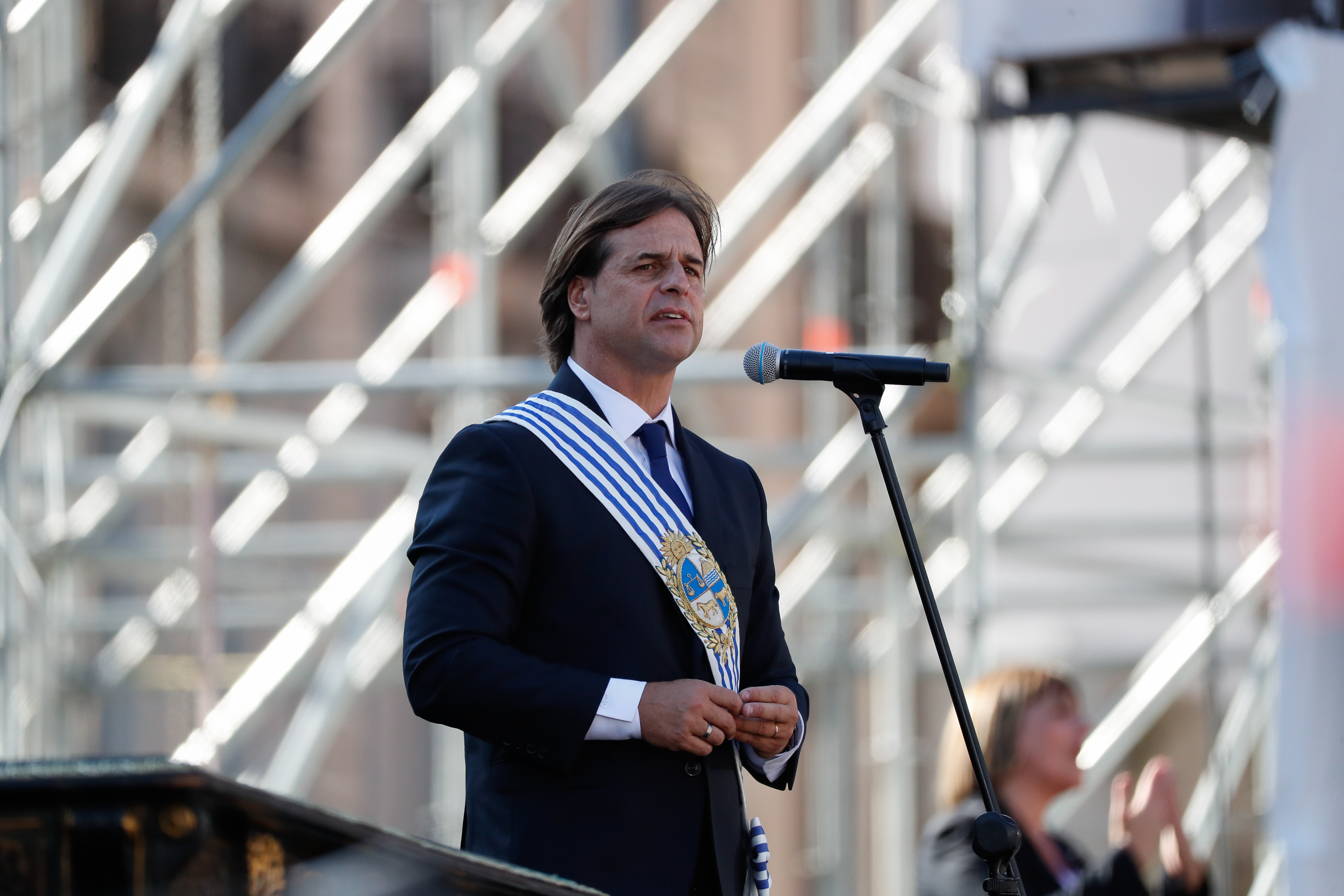
- President Lacalle Pou during his address in Plaza Independencia
- Date: March 1, 2020; 6 years ago
- Time: 14:00 p.m. UTC-3
- Location: Legislative Palace, Plaza Independencia
- Participants: Luis Lacalle Pou; 42nd president of Uruguay — Assuming office Beatriz Argimón; 18th vice president of Uruguay — Assuming office José Mujica; President of the Senate — Administering oaths

The inauguration of Luis Lacalle Pou as the 42nd president of Uruguay took place on 1 March 2020 in Montevideo and marked commencement of the term of Luis Lacalle Pou as president and Beatriz Argimón as vice president.

== Events ==
=== Ceremony ===
Administered by the president of the Senate, José Mujica, the presidential oath was taken, before the General Assembly, in keeping with Article One Hundred and Fifty-One, Chapter 1, Section 9 of the Uruguayan Constitution. Lacalle Pou delivered a 30-minute opening speech, which was described as "short and pragmatic." It struck a tone that was liberalist. The soprano Luz del Alba Rubio sang the national anthem in E-flat major, just as Francisco José Debali conceived in 1833. The performance was accompanied by the choir of the SODRE.

After the oath, the new president and vice president paraded down along Libertador Avenue in a 1937 Ford V8 convertible that belonged to Lacalle Pou's great-grandfather, Luis Alberto de Herrera. Hundreds of horsemen from all over the country came to the capital to accompany the President's parade, which ended in Plaza Independencia.

At 4:30 p.m. in Plaza Independencia, President Lacalle Pou received the presidential sash of the outgoing president, Tabaré Vázquez, and was formally invested. There were present, several foreign leaders, legislators and other authorities, as well as the families of Lacalle Pou and Argimón. The appointed members of the Cabinet signed the Minutes Book and were invested. Subsequently, a military parade honors the President and members of the government. Likewise, President Lacalle Pou addressed the public present.

=== Post-ceremony events ===
Later, the members of the new government entered the Estévez Palace, and the President and the First Lady along with their children greeted from the balcony, as did Vice President Beatriz Argimón, who appeared with her husband, Jorge Fernández Reyes. Afterwards, President Lacalle Pou, the First Lady, Lorena Ponce De León, and the Minister of Foreign Relations, Ernesto Talvi, greeted the guests of international delegations.

== International attendees ==
=== Sovereign states ===
Country	Dignitary
Angola	Minister of Foreign Affairs Manuel Domingos Augusto
Argentina	Minister of Foreign Affairs and Worship Felipe Solá
Armenia	Vice President of National Assembly Alen Simonyan
Australia	Ambassador Brett Hackett
Austria	Ambassador Johannes Cristoph Meran
Azerbaijan	Ambassador Rashad Aslanov
Bahrain	Ambassador to the UN Jamal Fares Alrowaiei
Bangladesh	President Abdul Hamid
Belarus	Ambassador Vladzimir Astapenka
Belgium	Ambassador Peter Maddens
Bolivia	Minister of Foreign Affairs Karen Longaric
Brazil	President Jair Bolsonaro
Bulgaria	Ambassador Andrey Tehov
Canada	Leader of the Government in the House of Commons Pablo Rodríguez
Chile	President Sebastián Piñera
China	Minister of Ecology and Environment Li Ganjie
Colombia	President Iván Duque Márquez
Costa Rica	Ambassador Irina Elizondo Delgado
Croatia	Ambassador Duska Paravic
Cyprus	Ambassador Haralambos Kafkarides
Czech Republic	Ambassador Karel Berman
Denmark	Ambassador Soren Vohtz
Dominican Republic	Ambassador Luis Arias Núñez
Ecuador	Vice President Otto Sonnenholzner
Egypt	Ambassador Amr Abbas Abdelhadi
El Salvador	Ambassador Rafael Figueroa Vanegas
Finland	Ambassador Kirsi Vanamo-Santacruz
France	Ambassador Hugues Moret
Georgia	Ambassador Rakli Kurashvili
Germany	Ambassador Ingo Von Voss
Ghana	Ambassador Abena Pokua Adompim Busia
Greece	Ambassador Georgios Aravositas
Guatemala	Ambassador Antonio Fernando Arenales
Holy See	Apostolic Nuncio Nicola Girasoli
Honduras	Secretary of State for the Presidency Ebal Jair Díaz Lupian
Hungary	Charge d'affaires István Sándor
India	Ambassador Dinesh Bhatia
Indonesia	Ambassador Niniek Kun Naryatie Siswojo
Iran	Ambassador Abolfazl Pasandideh
Ireland	Ambassador Jackie O'halloran
Israel	Ambassador Yoed Magen
Italy	Vice Minister of Foreign Affairs Ricardo Merlo
Jamaica	Ambassador Joyce Miller
Japan	Member of the House of Representatives Takeo Kawamura
Kazakhstan	Ambassador Kairat Sarzhanov
Kenya	Ambassador Anthony Mwaniki Muchiri
Korea, South	Head of Global Civic Sharing Park Myung Kwang
Kuwait	Ambassador Abdullah Ali Alyahya
Latvia	Honorary consul Miguel Angel Loinaz Ramos
Lithuania	Honorary consul Cecilia Hernandes Svobas
Luxembourg	Ambassador Roel Nieuwnkamp
Malaysia	Ambassador Mohd Khalid Abbasi Abdul Razak
Malta	Ambassador Arnaldo Acosta Núñez
Mexico	Secretary of Foreign Affairs Marcelo Ebrard Casaubon
Monaco	Counselor Igor Bojanovic
Morocco	President of the Senate Abdelhakin Benchamach
Mozambique	Ambassador Gamiliel Sepulveda Joao Munguambe
Netherlands	Ambassador Roel Nieuwenkamp
New Zealand	Ambassador Carl Worker
Norway	Ambassador Lars Vaagen
Oman	Ambassador Amad Hamood Salim Al Abri
Palestine	Ambassador Walid Abdel Rahim
Panama	Minister of Foreign Affairs Alejandro Ferrer
Paraguay	President Mario Abdo Benítez
Peru	Prime Minister Vicente Zeballos
Philippines	Ambassador Linglingay Lacanlale
Poland	Ambassador Aleksandra Piatkowska
Portugal	Minister of Environment João Pedro Matos Fernandes
Qatar	Deputy Prime Minister Hamad Bin Abdulaziz Al-Kawari
Romania	Ambassador Valentin Florea
Russia	Ambassador Nikolay Sofinskiy
Saudi Arabia	Ambassador Riyad Bin Saud Alkhenene
Serbia	Ambassador Jela Bacovic
Slovakia	Ambassador Rastislav Hindický
Slovenia	Ambassador Alain Brian Bergant
South Africa	Ambassador Phumelele Gwala
Spain	King Felipe VI
Sri Lanka	Ambassador Musthafa Mohamed Jaffeer
Suriname	Ambassador Marciano Edgar Armaketo
Sweden	Ambassador Anders Carlsson
Switzerland	Ambassador Martin Strub
Thailand	Ambassador Patcharee Poompachati
Turkey	Ambassador Şefik Vural Altay
Ukraine	Deputy Minister Economic Development, Trade and Agriculture Taras Kachka
United Arab Emirates	Ambassador Saeed Rashed Alzaabi
United Kingdom	Minister for European Neighbourhood and the Americas Wendy Morton
United States	Administrator of the Environmental Protection Agency Andrew R. Wheeler
Vietnam	Ambassador Dung Dang Xuan

=== International organizations ===
Country	Dignitary
Organization of American States	Secretary-General Luis Almagro
Latin-American Energy Organization	Executive Secretary Alfonso Bonilla Blanco
World Tourism Organization	Secretary-General Zurab Pololikashvili
Organization of Ibero-American States	Secretary-General Andrés Delich
International Labour Organization	Director for South Cone of Latin America Fabio Bertranau
Pan American Health Organization	Representative Giovanni Escalante
United Nations Educational, Scientific and Cultural Organization	Member of the Governor Board Lidia Brito
United Nations Industrial Development Organization	Representative Manuel Albaladejo
Food and Agriculture Organization	Ambassador Alberto Meza Robayo
International Organization for Migration	Representative Tanja Pacifico
Inter-American Children's Institute	Director-General Victor Giorgi
Inter-American Institute for Cooperation on Agriculture	Director-General Manuel Otero
