= Miguel Ángel Moratinos =

Spanish diplomat and politician

United Nations Under-Secretary-General, High-Representative for the Alliance of Civilizations
- Incumbent
- Assumed office 7 January 2019
- Secretary-General: António Guterres
- Preceded by: Nassir Abdulaziz Al-Nasser

Minister of Foreign Affairs and Cooperation
- In office 18 April 2004 – 21 October 2010
- Prime Minister: José Luis Rodríguez Zapatero
- Preceded by: Ana Palacio
- Succeeded by: Trinidad Jiménez

Personal details
- Born: 8 June 1951 (age 75) Madrid, Spain
- Party: Spanish Socialist Workers' Party
- Education: Complutense University
- Website: www.blogdemoratinos.es

Miguel Ángel Moratinos Cuyaubé (born 8 June 1951) is a Spanish diplomat and politician, a member of the Socialist Workers' Party and was a member of Congress from 2004 to 2011, where he represented Córdoba. From 2004 to 2010, he served as the Minister of Foreign Affairs and Cooperation of Spain. In 2018, he was appointed as United Nations Under-Secretary-General holding the position of High Representative for the Alliance of Civilizations and assumed the position on 7 January 2019.

== Education ==
Born in 1951, Moratinos graduated in Law and Political Sciences at the University Complutense in Madrid, and then in Diplomatic Studies at the Diplomatic School of Spain.

== Political career ==
Working with Javier Solana, who was then Spanish foreign minister, Moratinos helped prepare the Euro-Mediterranean dialogue launched in November 1995 in Barcelona. He served briefly as ambassador of Spain to Israel in 1996.

=== EU Special Representative ===
Between 1996 and 2003, Moratinos was the European Union Special Representative for the Middle East, based in Cyprus and Brussels. In this capacity, he attended most meetings of EU foreign ministers. During his time in office, the European Union – which had already been the biggest financial contributor to the region – also became increasingly vocal about Israeli-Palestinian relations.

=== Minister of Foreign Affairs ===
Moratinos served as Minister of Foreign Affairs in the Government of José Luis Rodríguez Zapatero from 18 April 2004 until 21 October 2010, when he was replaced by Trinidad Jiménez.

By the end of 2009, Moratinos was mentioned by news media as a potential candidate for the position of High Representative of the Union for Foreign Affairs and Security Policy; the post later went to Catherine Ashton instead.

Relations with Gibraltar

In September 2006, Moratinos joined UK Minister for Europe Geoff Hoon and Gibraltar's Chief Minister Peter Caruana in signing the Cordoba Agreement, an agreement to establish a Tripartite forum for co-operation on Gibraltar. As part of the agreement, he attended talks in Gibraltar in July 2009, making him the first Spanish minister to ever make an official visit to the British Overseas Territory.

Transatlantic relations

In September 2006, Moratinos became the first government official to appear before the European Parliament's committee investigating CIA activity in Europe.

In 2009, Moratinos sent a confidential note to U.S. Secretary of State Hillary Clinton warning that Spanish public opinion could turn anti-American if Spain disclosed a study on contamination caused by the 1966 Palomares B-52 crash, according to a note contained in the WikiLeaks documents and published at the time by the newspaper El País.

In 2010, Moratinos announced that Spain was willing to take in five inmates from the American military prison in Guantánamo Bay, Cuba.

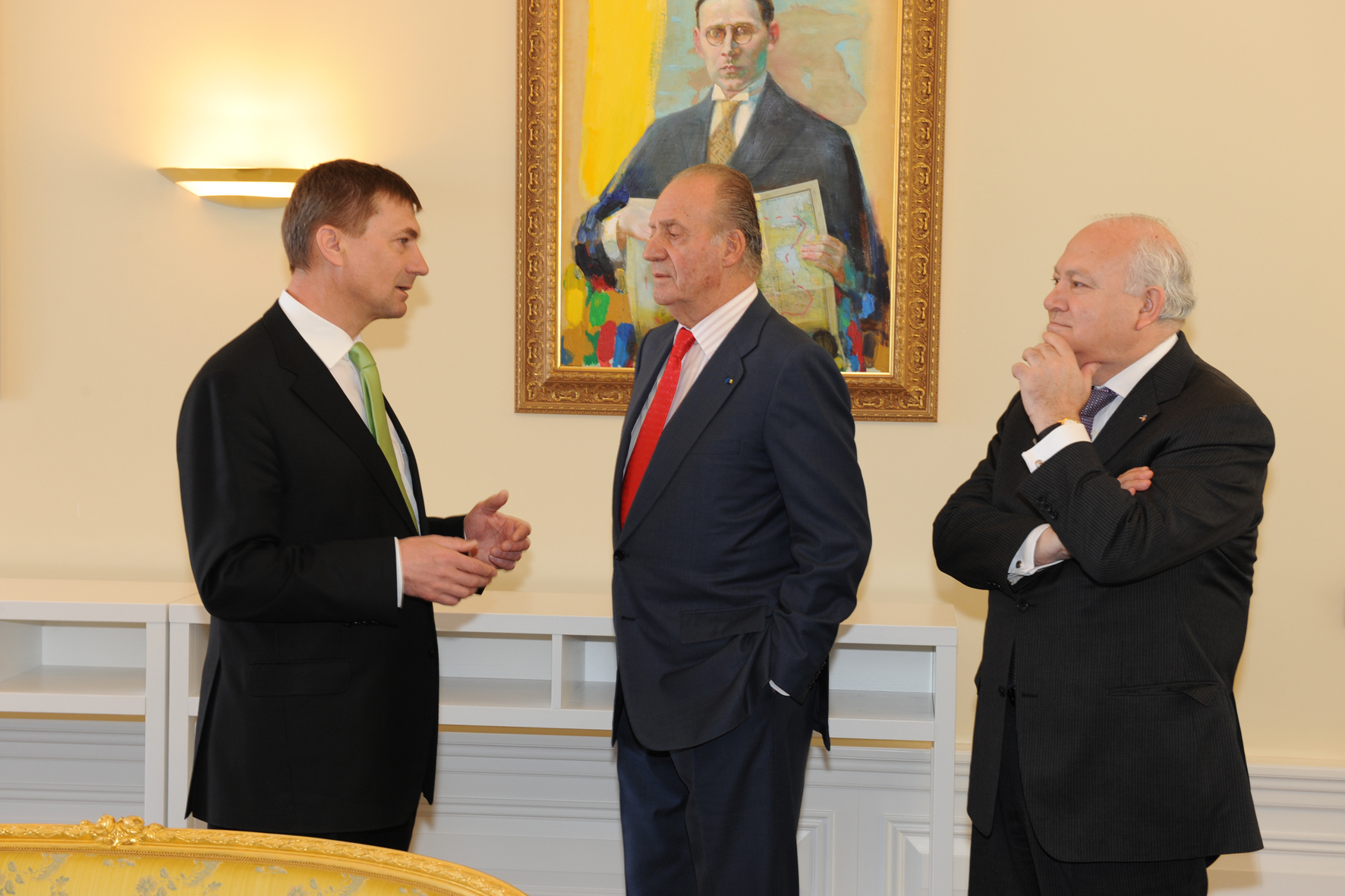
Miguel Ángel Moratinos accompanying His Majesty King Juan Carlos I in his 2009 state visit to Estonia, being greeted by the prime minister of Estonia Andrus Ansip.

OSCE chairmanship

In his capacity as minister, Moratinos was the Chairman-in-Office of the Organization for Security and Co-operation in Europe (OSCE) in 2007. On 17 August 2007, he appointed Croatian diplomat and ex-minister Miomir Žužul, "to be his personal representative in a mission to Georgia on (a) missile incident that took place on 6 August," alleged to be a Russian missile strike on Georgian territory.

Relations with Latin America

Following the Bolivian general election in December 2005, Moratinos summoned the Vatican's envoy to Spain after a comedian for conservative radio station Cadena COPE held a five-minute telephone conversation with the newly elected president of Bolivia, Evo Morales, while claiming to be the Spanish prime minister.

In October 2006, Moratinos announced that EADS CASA, a division of the European defense company EADS, had decided to cancel a deal on selling 12 military transport planes to Venezuela because American government objections made it unfeasible.

In 2007, U.S. Secretary of State Condoleezza Rice criticized Spain for not doing more to support dissidents in communist Cuba, after Moratinos chose not to meet with Cuban dissidents during a visit to the United States in April 2007. In 2010, he took part in the tripartite negotiations with Cuban President Raúl Castro and Roman Catholic bishop Jaime Ortega that resulted in pardons being granted to 52 Black Spring prisoners on the condition that they go into exile in Spain.

In late 2009, Moratinos was at the forefront of efforts to reinstate ousted President Manuel Zelaya of Honduras.

== Later career ==
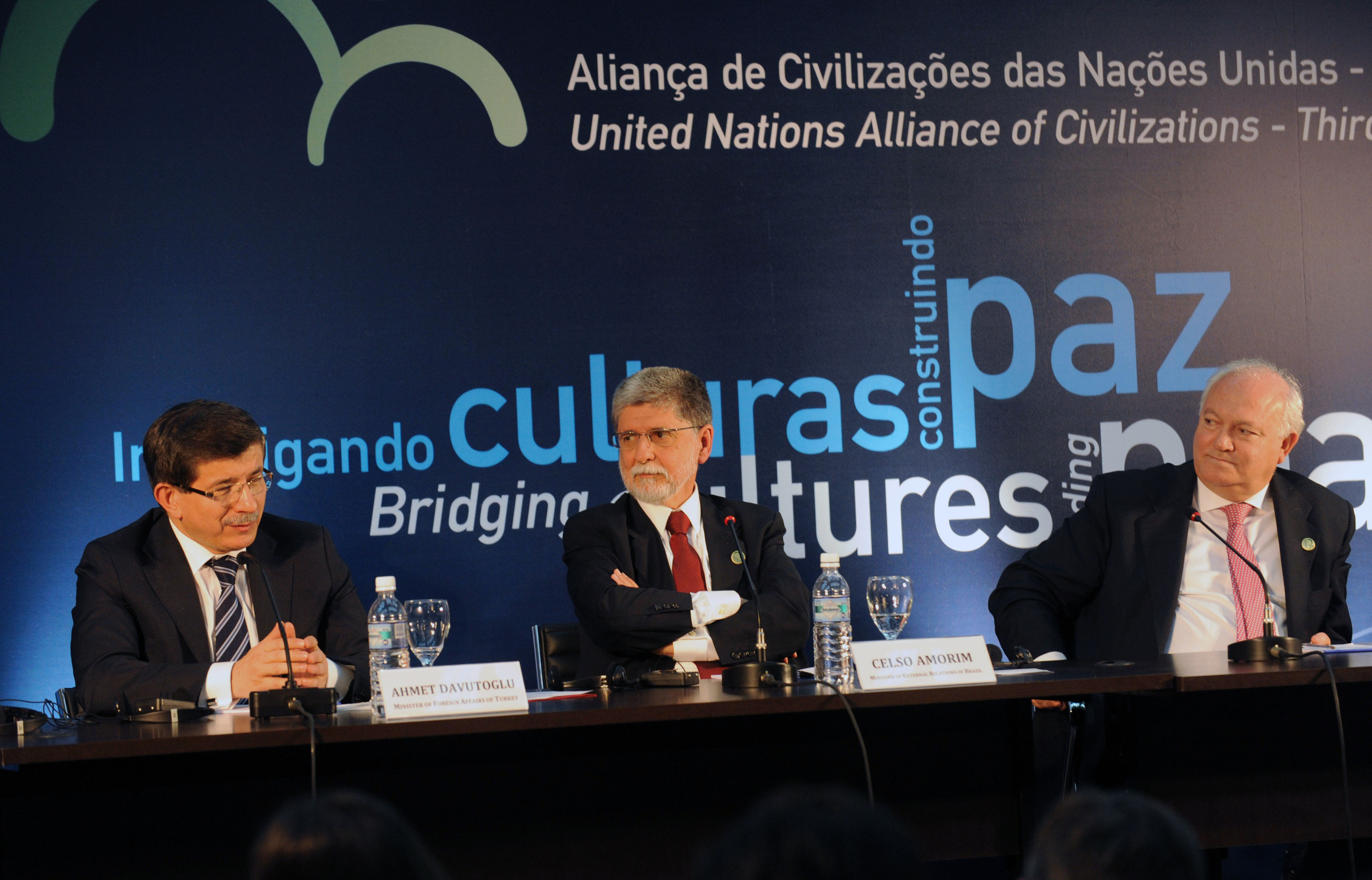
Moratinos together with Turkish and Brazilian foreign ministers Davutoğlu and Amorim

In 2010, Moratinos was given a new mission as a special envoy trying to defuse a row between Israel and Egypt that threatened to derail, for the second time, a summit of the Union for the Mediterranean.

Since 2011, Moratinos has been teaching at Sciences Po Paris. Also in 2011, he was nominated by the Spanish government as a candidate for the position of director general of FAO; as part of his election campaign, he visited 90 countries. However, on June 26 he lost to Brazilian José Graziano da Silva. He received 88 votes out of 180 cast in the second round, while Graziano da Silva won 92.

In mid-2012, Moratinos was among the candidates at the United Nations for a possible replacement of Kofi Annan as UN-Arab League Joint Special Envoy for Syria.

From 2012 to 2013, Moratinos was a member of the High-Level Advisory Council of the President of the 67th Session of the United Nations General Assembly, Serbia's then foreign minister Vuk Jeremić.

Following consultations, United Nations Secretary-General António Guterres appointed Moratinos as his High Representative for the Alliance of Civilizations in 2018, succeeding Nassir Abdulaziz Al-Nasser.

== Other activities ==
In addition, Moratinos has held various paid and unpaid positions, including:

- Bahrain Center for Strategic, International and Energy Studies (DERASAT), member of the international advisory board
- British University in Egypt, member of the board of trustees
- Center for International Relations and Sustainable Development (CIRSD), member of the board of advisors
- Fundación Onuart, chairman of the board of trustees
- Geneva Centre for Security Policy (GCSP), associate fellow
- Graduate School for Global and International Studies, University of Salamanca, member of the advisory board
- Institut de Prospective Economique du Monde Méditerranéen (IPEMED), chairman of the Political Sponsorship Committee
- Spanish Network of Sustainable Development (REDS), founder and chairman
- The Earth Institute at Columbia University, senior advisor of Sustainable Development Solutions Network
- United Nations Sustainable Development Solutions Network (SDSN), member of the leadership council

== Recognition ==
=== National honors ===
- Honorary citizen of Belgrade (2009)
- Order of the Cross of Terra Mariana (2007)
- Order of Ouissam Alaouite

=== Honorary degrees ===
- Honorary doctorate of the University of Malta
- Honorary doctorates of Ben-Gurion University of the Negev
- Honorary doctorates of Al-Quds University
- Honorary doctorates of Tel Aviv University

Political offices
Preceded by Ana Palacio	Minister of Foreign Affairs and Cooperation; 2004–2010	Succeeded by Trinidad Jiménez
Diplomatic posts
Preceded by Cecilia Malmström	President of the Council of the European Union; 2010	Succeeded by Steven Vanackere
