= Palestine–Peru relations =

- Palestine: Peru

Palestine–Peru relations are bilateral relations between the State of Palestine and Republic of Peru. Peru recognized Palestine as a sovereign state on 24 January 2011. Both nations are members of the Non-Aligned Movement. Palestine has an embassy in Lima.

== History ==
Palestinian immigration to Peru began in the second half of the 19th century, with mostly Orthodox immigrants from Palestine, as well as neighbouring Lebanon and Syria reaching the country either from neighbouring Bolivia or via ships that reached the southern parts of the country. Nevertheless, Arab influences in the region date back to its Spanish era.

The first Palestinian representation in Peru opened in 1979 as the office of the Palestine Liberation Organization (PLO), which at the time had no diplomatic status. In 1998, it began hosting the Special Delegation of the PLO, and in 2000, Javier Pérez de Cuéllar raised the level of the delegation to a de facto embassy.

In 1985, the city of Cuzco staged a commemoration of the Sabra and Shatila massacre. The year prior, the farewell party of PLO representative Issam Besseiso was attended by prominent left-wing politicians, such as congressman Miguel Ángel Mufarech and then Mayor of Lima, Alfonso Barrantes.

On July 29, 1998, the Ministry of the Interior released a communiqué where it was revealed that three members of the Abu Nidal Organization were arrested by the Peruvian Investigative Police, after which the PLO's representative office released a communiqué of its own, denouncing the group as traitors. The group's members had reportedly planned a number of terrorist attacks in Peruvian territory.

Peru formally recognised Palestine as a sovereign state on January 24, 2011. Thus, the delegation became the country's embassy to Peru.

In 2014, President of Peru Ollanta Humala visited Palestine, met with President of Palestine Mahmoud Abbas and laid a wreath at Yasser Arafat's tomb.

In 2022, then president Pedro Castillo announced the intention of the country to open an embassy in Palestine.

During the Gaza war, at least three Peruvian families numbered at nine people in total became trapped in the Gaza Strip, unable to leave as a result of the Israeli invasion that started on October 27.

== High-level visits ==
High-level visits from Palestine to Peru

- PLO Spokesman Farouk Kaddoumi (1985, 1987 and 1989)

High-level visits from Peru to Palestine

- President Ollanta Humala (2014)

== Resident diplomatic missions ==
- Palestine has an embassy in Lima.
- Peru does not have an embassy in Palestine.

== See also ==
- Foreign relations of Peru
- Foreign relations of Palestine
