= Israel–Spain relations =

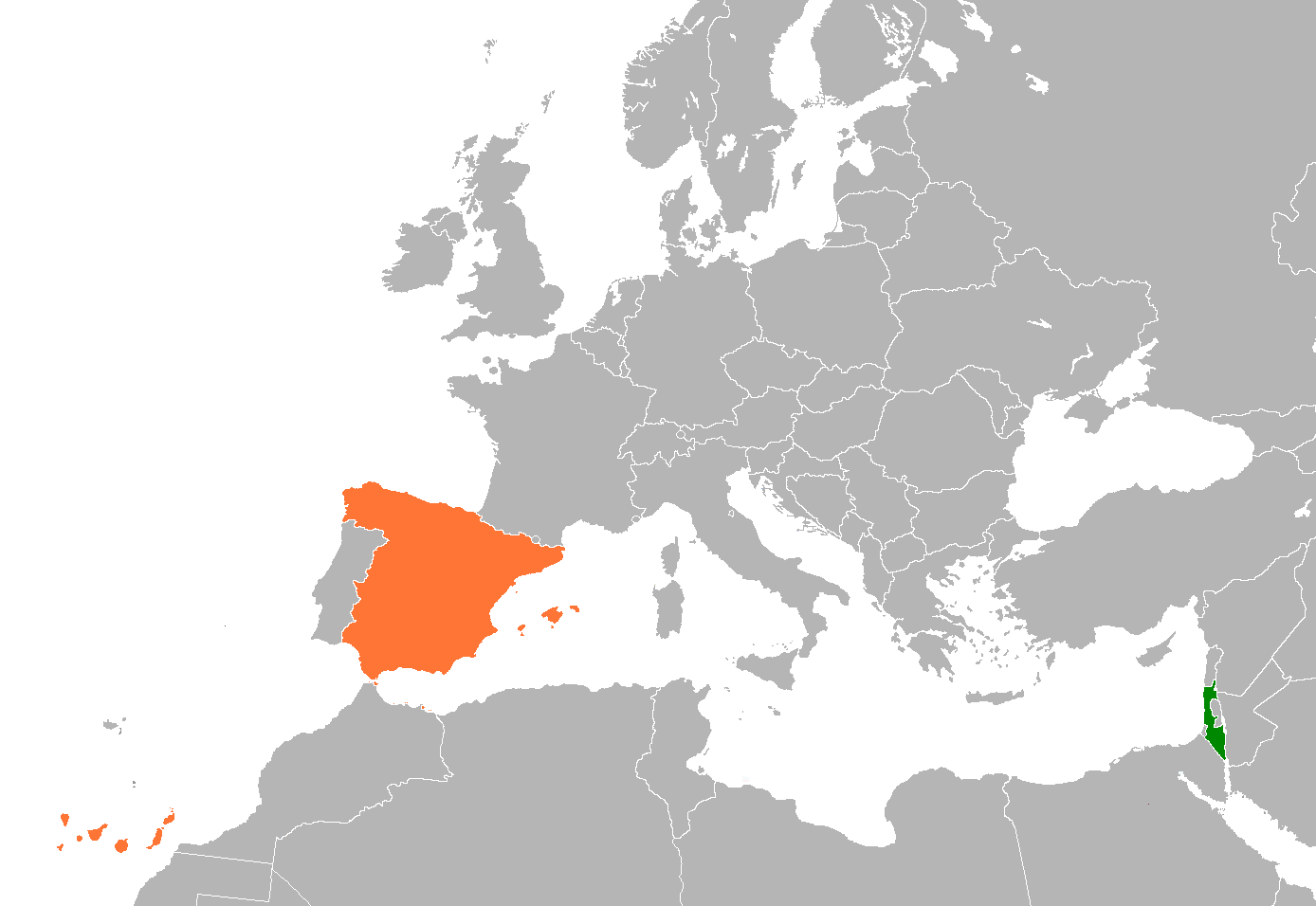
- Israel: Spain

Diplomatic mission
- Israeli embassy, Madrid: Spanish embassy, Tel Aviv

Israel and Spain have maintained diplomatic ties since 1986. Israel has an embassy in Madrid. Spain has an embassy in Tel Aviv, and an honorary consulate in Haifa. There is also a General Consulate in Jerusalem, which serves as a diplomatic mission to the city of Jerusalem (including both West and East Jerusalem), Gaza and the territories of the West Bank. In addition to both countries being member states of the United Nations, both countries are members of the Union for the Mediterranean.

Relations deteriorated significantly during the Gaza war that began in October 2023, particularly amid Spain’s criticism of Israel’s military campaign in the Gaza Strip and growing diplomatic disputes between the two governments. The Spanish government, led by Prime Minister Pedro Sánchez, was among the most outspoken European critics of Israel’s conduct in the war and called for a ceasefire and expanded humanitarian access to Gaza. Tensions further escalated as Spain joined Ireland and Norway in recognizing the State of Palestine in 2024, prompting diplomatic protests from Israel.

== History ==
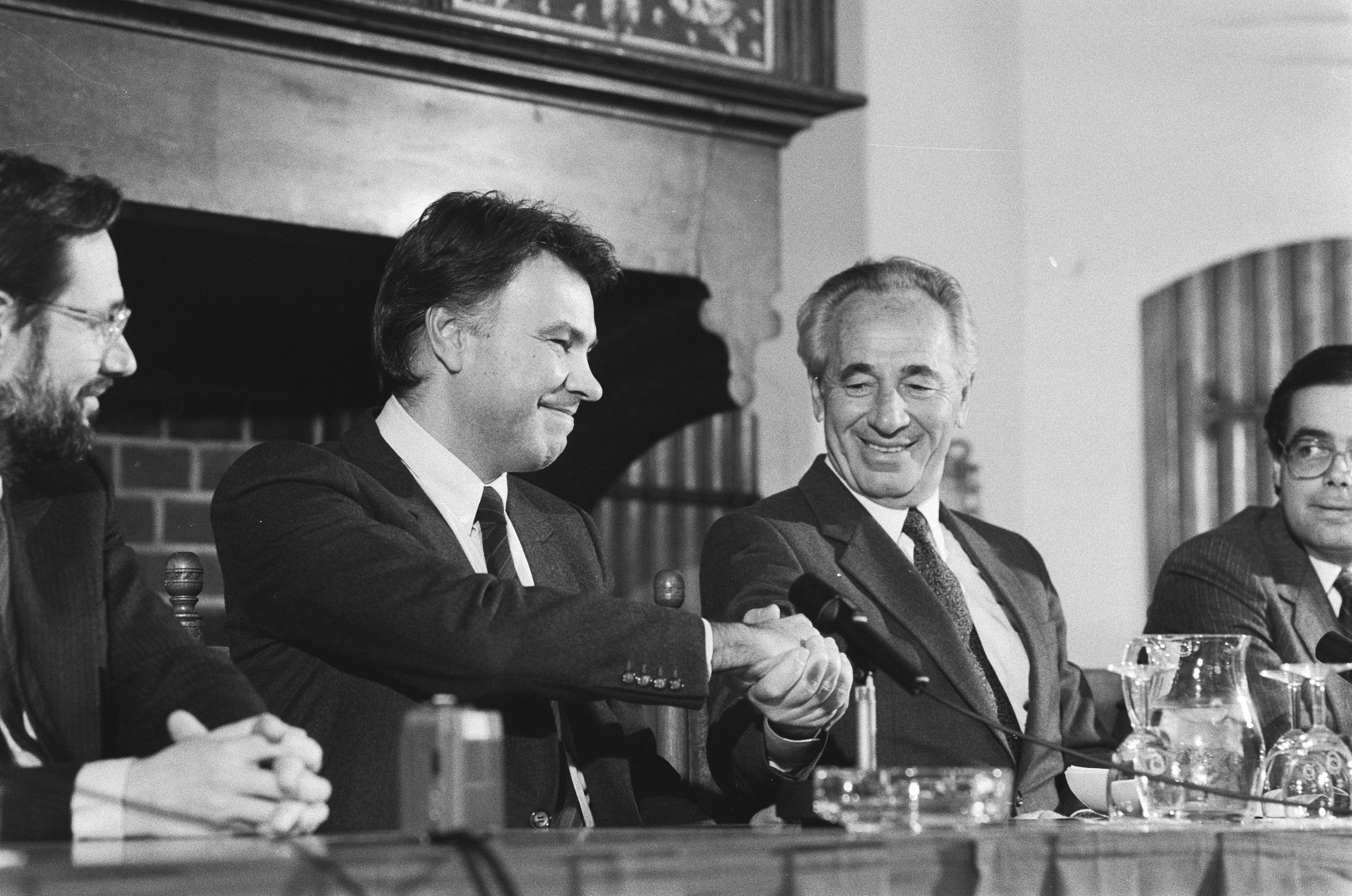
Spanish prime minister Felipe González meeting Israeli prime minister Shimon Peres in 1986

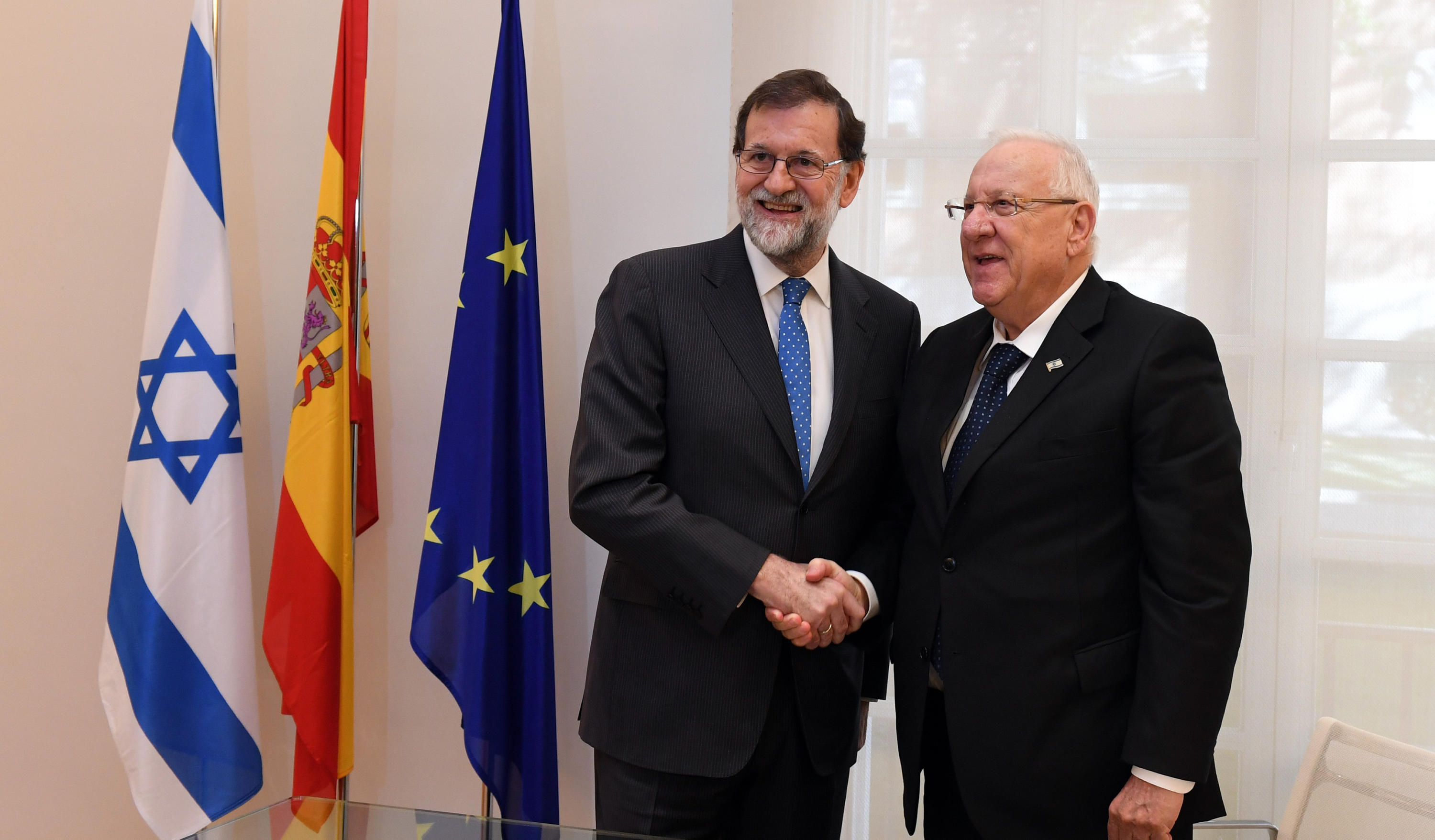
Israeli president Reuven Rivlin meeting with the Spanish prime minister Mariano Rajoy, 7 November 2017

=== 20th century ===
Spanish policy towards the Middle East was determined by the nature of the Francoist regime, and by post-World War II politics. Franco made some overtures towards Israel but short of recognizing the country, not least because the latter's government had no interest in being recognised by such a regime. This outright rejection from the newly created State of Israel towards the Francoist dictatorship was born out of domestic politics and ideological reasons. On 16 May 1949, speaking against a proposal made by several Latin American countries which favoured the re-establishment of diplomatic relations with Spain, Israeli diplomat Abba Eban made a speech in which he said "For us, the central and inescapable point is the association of this regime with that Nazi-Fascist alliance which corroded the moral foundations of civilized life and inflicted upon the human race its most terrible and devastating ordeal. Of that coalition, the only surviving expression is the Spanish regime which welcomed, accepted, congratulated and upheld the prospect of Nazi supremacy in Europe and the world." In retort to this, the Francoist government sponsored the publication of a pamphlet, España y los Judíos (1949), which erroneously claimed that Franco had saved as many as 50,000 Jews from France and South-Eastern Europe during the Holocaust. In 1949, the State of Israel voted against lifting sanctions against Spain in the United Nations General Assembly due to the Francoist regime's sympathy and material support for the Axis Powers. The hostility between both countries paved the way for Spain's fostering of relations with the unaligned Arab nations (nurturing the narrative of the so-called "traditional Hispano-Arab friendship"), which helped Spain to overcome international isolation. A cornerstone of Arab-Spanish friendship was the non-recognition of Israel. In these years, several editions of the antisemitic libel of The Protocols of the Elders of Zion were published in Spain, finding positive reception as factual truth among the most extreme factions of the regime. Despite the lack of diplomatic ties, the Franco government aided in Jewish emigration from Morocco in the 1960s and, during the Six-Day War in 1967, issued laissez-passer documents to Egyptian Jews, enabling them to emigrate.

The pro-Arab views of the previous Francoist regime had created a stance that was very difficult to overcome even after the transition to democracy. The first Spanish government after Franco's death, headed by Adolfo Suárez, declared that it would not recognize Israel unless it withdrew from the West Bank and allowed the creation of a Palestinian state.

Following Suárez's resignation in 1981, the new president of the government of Spain, Leopoldo Calvo Sotelo, seemed inclined to inaugurate relations between Spain and Israel but this had to wait for the next government due to the pro-Arab stance of the foreign minister José Pedro Pérez-Llorca, who argued against recognition due to fears of an oil embargo as reprisal by Arab countries.

Nevertheless, small steps were taken towards rapprochement, including informal contacts by Samuel Hadas, the Israeli representative to the United Nations World Tourism Organization based in Madrid. Hadas, a member of the Israeli Labor Party, was responsible for the creation of a Spanish Friends of Israel association and a dialogue group that included several Spanish Socialist Workers Party members of parliament, such as Enrique Múgica Herzog, as well as members of the ruling party, the UCD.

With a view to establishing full diplomatic relations with Israel, President of the Government Felipe González, who had been elected in 1982 on a Socialist platform three years earlier, sent a personal letter to secretary general of the Arab League, Chedli Klibi, on 25 April 1985, advising him of Spain's plans. Following Operation Wooden Leg, the Spanish Government issued a strong condemnation of the attack, putting a temporary hold to the recognition process. Further conversations with ambassadors from Arab states in Madrid followed in January of the next year, advising them of Spain's forthcoming plans. Spain and Israel established diplomatic relations on 17 January 1986. Samuel Hadas was named Israel Ambassador in Madrid. Spain had joined the European Economic Community on 1 January. Soon after, a representative office for the PLO opened in Madrid "as evidence of Spain traditional policy of friendship with the Palestinian people and as an instrument to achieve a lasting, just and global solution to the Israeli-Arab conflict".

On 2 December 1991, Felipe González became the first Spanish head of government to visit Israel, holding, among other things, a meeting with Israeli prime minister Yitzak Shamir which involved the discussion of the situation in the region, bilateral ties between the two nations and about the situation in Europe.

=== 21st century ===
In 2000, Spain lifted its veto on Israel's admission to the Western European Group of the United Nations, on a basis of permanent renewal of temporary full membership, ending Israel's administrative limbo, as its membership in the Asian Group had been withheld due to the large majority of Muslim countries in the Asian block opposing.

In October 2011, Spanish crown prince Felipe and his wife, Princess Letizia, arrived in Israel for a two-day state visit to celebrate the 25th anniversary of the establishment of diplomatic relations and meet with local scientists.

==== October 7 attacks and the Gaza war ====
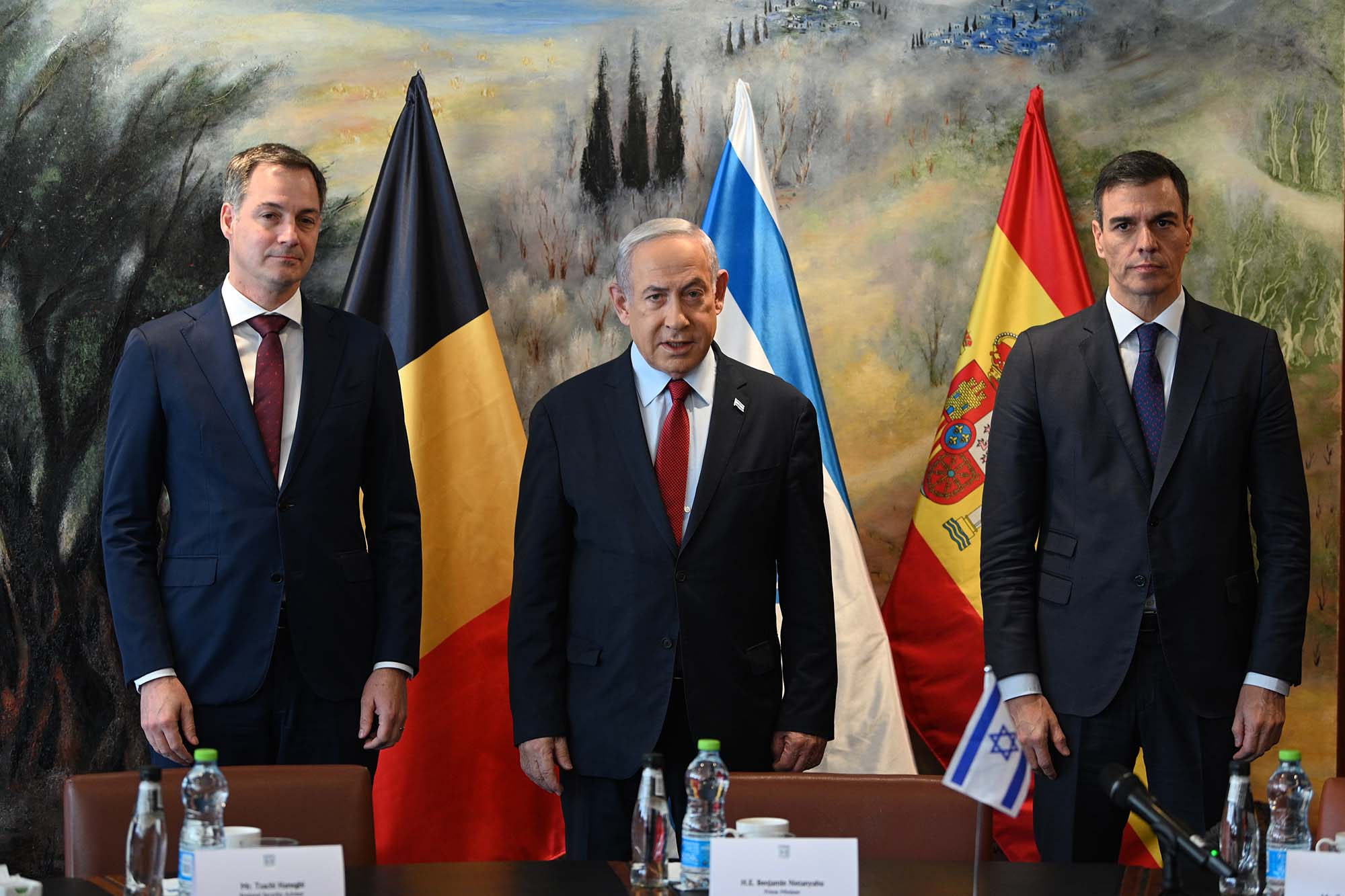
Prime Minister Pedro Sánchez and Belgian prime minister Alexander De Croo with Israeli prime minister Benjamin Netanyahu during the pair's official visit to Israel, November 2023

Following the October 7 Attacks by Hamas on Israel, Pedro Sánchez expressed his condolences and condemnation of the attacks on Israel, saying Israel has the right to defend itself. He also called for the immediate release of the Israeli hostages. Jose Manuel Albares the Spanish Foreign Minister said he condemns the attacks tweeting: “We strongly condemn the very serious terrorist attacks from Gaza against Israel. “Overwhelmed by this indiscriminate violence. All our solidarity (is) with the victims".

In October 2023, during the Gaza war, Spanish Minister of Social Affairs Ione Belarra proclaimed that Israeli prime minister Benjamin Netanyahu should be brought before the International Criminal Court for committing war crimes. Spain's Equality Minister, Irene Montero, echoed a similar appeal, citing a recent case involving a Spanish aid worker killed in the Russian invasion of Ukraine. Montero emphasized that Israel's alleged violation of international criminal law and war crimes must face consequences.

This prompted the Israeli embassy in Madrid to accuse some of the members within the Spanish government of sympathizing or showing alignment with terrorist groups like ISIS. The Government of Spain issued a counter-communiqué stating that it "categorically" rejected "the falsehoods expressed in the communiqué of the Embassy of Israel about some of its members and does not accept unfounded insinuations about them". Foreign Minister José Manuel Albares also called Israeli ambassador Rodica Radian-Gordon, to show his "displeasure" and to tell her that those words were seen as an "unfriendly gesture".

Shortly before a visit to Israel and the West Bank in late November, Prime Minister of Spain Pedro Sánchez informed parliament of his government's intention to collaborate within the European Union and Spain to acknowledge a Palestinian state. During the visit, Sánchez, following a meeting with President of Egypt Abdel Fattah el-Sisi, jointly held a press conference at the Rafah border crossing with Belgian Prime Minister Alexander De Croo, emphasizing the importance of Israel's adherence to international humanitarian law.

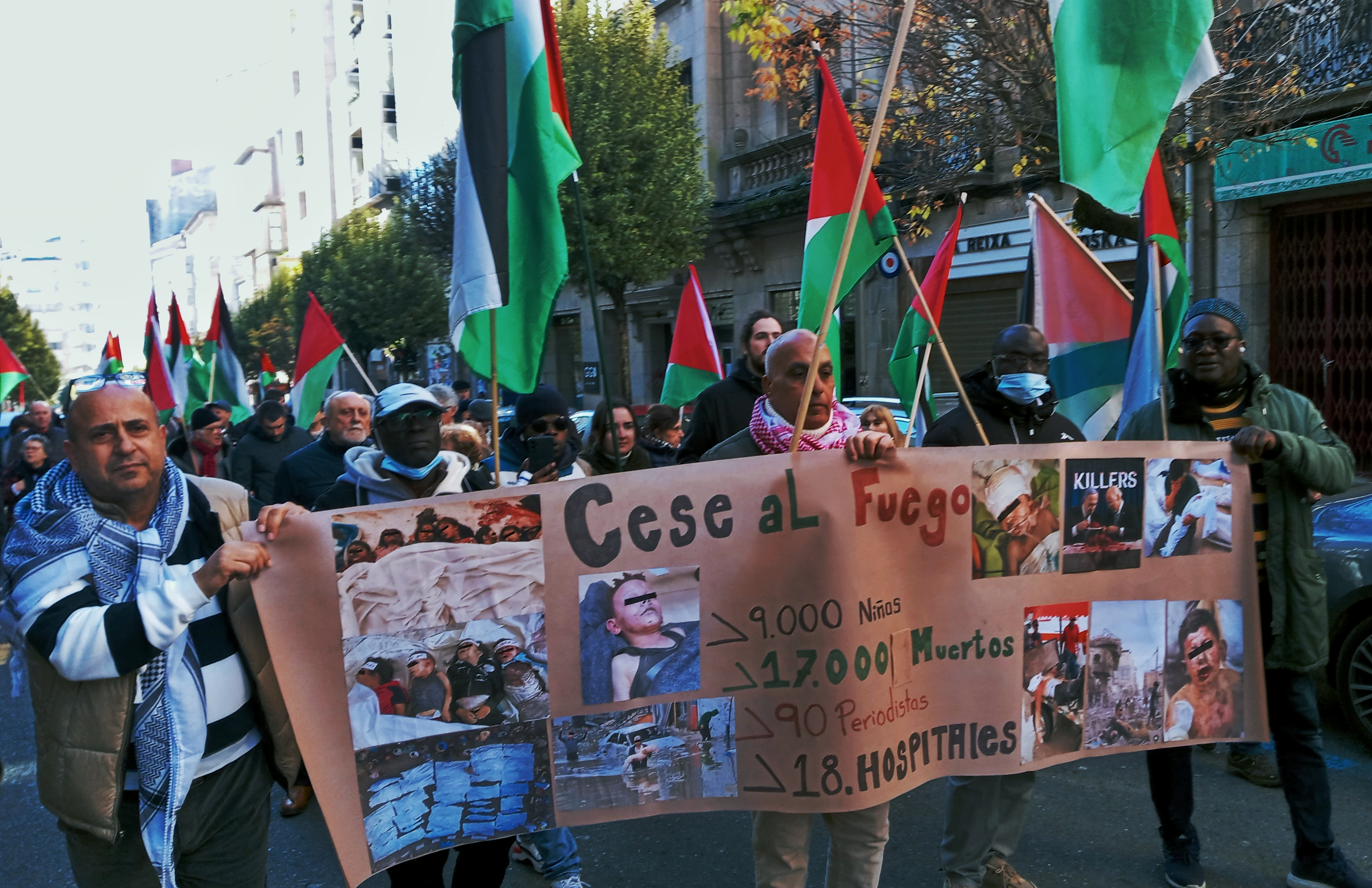
Pro-Palestine protest in Santiago de Compostela, 17 December 2023

The two leaders issued a joint statement denouncing the "unacceptable" indiscriminate killings of innocent civilians in the Gaza Strip, asserting that it was time for the international community and the European Union (EU) to officially recognize the State of Palestine, and called for a lasting ceasefire in the war-torn region. Israel criticized both the prime ministers for not holding Hamas fully accountable for what they termed "crimes against humanity". Israeli foreign minister Eli Cohen summoned the ambassadors of Belgium and Spain for a stern reprimand, denouncing what he described as "false claims" supporting terrorism.

Following the visit, Sánchez voiced serious doubts about Israel's adherence to international humanitarian law, referencing distressing footage and the increasing number of children casualties. In response to what Israel termed a "shameful statement" by Sanchez, the country recalled its envoy to Madrid.

Relations were further damaged in 2024 when Spain, announced their intent to recognize Palestine as an independent state by 28 May 2024, leading Israel to recall Radian-Gordon. Netanyahu denounced the move as support for terrorism.

Spanish second deputy prime minister Yolanda Díaz ended a speech with the pro-Palestine lemma from the river to the sea, Palestine will be free on 24 May 2024. Israeli foreign minister Israel Katz took offence and proceeded to publish a political attack video on X, interspersing images of Hamas members and flamenco dancers, also pledging to block Palestinians' access to services from the Spanish Consulate in Israeli-occupied East Jerusalem (later threatening to outright close it should it continue providing services to Palestinians). Albares pointed out that the Consulate has existed since 1853, long before the founding of any State of Israel, and that upon the 1986 establishment of diplomatic relations between both countries, Israel agreed on the recognition and commitment to respecting the "historical status of the Consulate General". Spanish Defence Minister Margarita Robles deemed what was happening in Gaza to be a "true genocide".

Spain's foreign minister said in January 2024 that arms sales to Israel were now embargoed. However, on Monday, online newspaper eldiario.es reported that Spain had exported ammunition to Israel in November. Spain's Secretary of State for Trade explained that the "material was for tests or demonstrations" and "corresponds to licences granted before 7 October".

In May 2024, Spain refused permission for a ship carrying arms to Israel to dock at a Spanish port. On the same month, Vox leader Santiago Abascal met Benjamin Netanyahu amid Spanish Government recognition of Palestine.

In October 2024, the Israeli Ministry of Foreign Affairs chastised Spain for having "become a haven for sowing hatred and inciting the destruction of Israel". Also in that month, the Spanish Ministry of Foreign Affairs strongly condemned Israeli attacks on UNIFIL positions in Naqoura, southern Lebanon (summoning the Israeli charge d'affaires in Spain), and demanded Israel to comply with its obligations under International humanitarian law and United Nations Security Council Resolution 1701. Likewise, Spanish prime minister Pedro Sánchez urged the rest of the world to stop selling weapons to Israel.

In February 2025, Israeli Defense Minister Israel Katz suggested that some Palestinians from Gaza should immigrate to Spain. Spanish Foreign Minister José Manuel Albares rejected Katz's proposal, saying that "Gaza is the land of the people of Gaza" and should be part of a future Palestinian state.

On 21 May 2025, the Catalan government announced the immediate closure of the Tel Aviv office, operated by ACCIÓ, its trade and investment agency. This decision was made in protest against Israel's military actions in Gaza, which have resulted in significant civilian casualties.

In September 2025, during the Vuelta a España road cycling race, pro-Palestinian activists staged demonstrations against the participation of the team Israel-Premier Tech, holding protests along parts of the race route, ultimately resulting in the cancellation of the final stage in Madrid, as protests obstructed a significant portion of the course. Foreign minister José Manuel Albares said in a radio interview on 4 September he would support banning the "Israel-Premier Tech" team from the competition, but stressed it would be up to the sport's governing body to decide.. Days after the incident, the team chose to remove the word "Israel" from its kit.

On 8 September 2025, following the decision of the Spanish government to introduce a new package of measures against Israel, including a full arms embargo, the prohibition of fuel ships transiting through Spanish ports, the denial of airspace access to aircraft carrying weapons bound for Israel and entry into Spain to all persons participating in the Gaza genocide, a ban on imports of products from illegal settlements and a limitation of consular services to Spanish citizens residing in those settlements. However, the Spanish government exempted Airbus from its ban on Israeli military and dual-use products, allowing the company to continue producing aircraft and drones incorporating Israeli technology at its facilities in Spain. Airbus, which accounted for about 60% of Spain's aerospace and defence exports, manufactures the A400M Atlas, C295, and A330 MRTT aircraft, as well as SIRTAP surveillance drones, using Israeli technology. Israeli minister of Foreign Affairs, Gideon Sa'ar, announced that Díaz and minister of Youth Sira Rego would be prohibited from entering the country, and labeled Sánchez's government as "corrupt" and "antisemitic", with Díaz later welcoming the decision as "an honor". Spain recalled its ambassador in Israel the same day after Sa'ar declarations, effectively rendering both nations without formal ambassadors.

On 28 September 28, after statements by Sira Rego, Spain's Minister of Youth and Children supporting "a free Palestine from the river to the sea," Israel summoned Spain's Chargé d'Affaires Francisca Pedros to its Foreign Ministry. The Israeli Foreign Ministry described the statements as "anti-Israel." Dana Ehrlich, Israel's chargé d'affaires in Spain, also accused Rego of antisemitism.

==== 2026 Iran War ====
On 10 March 2026, Spain's gazette announced that the country officially withdrew Spain's ambassador to Israel, with the Ministry of Foreign Affairs stated that its embassy in Tel Aviv will be led by a chargé d’affaires. The Israeli Embassy in Spain has similarly been headed by a chargé d'affaires since May 2024.

On 19 April 2026, the Prime Minister of Spain, Pedro Sánchez, declared that Spain would officially suggest to the European Union to end its partnership agreement with Israel. Sánchez remarked that Israel “breaches international law” and thus “should not be a partner of the European Union.” Previously, the foreign ministers from Spain, Ireland, and Slovenia had charged Israel with breaching human rights and violating the EU partnership agreement due to the Israeli parliament's approval of the death penalty and the actions of settlers.

In August 2026, Spain prime minister said that Israel and Russia undertook a covert influence campaign to spread disinformation on the 2026 Ceuta migrant crisis.

== Religious and cultural ties ==
Many Israelis are Sephardi Jews, culturally associated with the Iberian Peninsula from where Jews were expelled in the late-fifteenth century. Many Israelis are also of Spanish and Portuguese Jewish extraction from before the expulsion of Jews from the Iberian peninsula. Some Israelis live in Spain today, and there is also a small contemporary Spanish Jewish community. Many Spanish people are also of converso or marrano origin, with a recent study estimating the figure to be as high as 20%. An Israeli newspaper, Maariv, noted that José Luis Rodríguez Zapatero has said that his family is of Jewish descent, probably from a family of Marranos.

In honor of the 25th anniversary of diplomatic and cultural relations between Spain and Israel, the Museo Nacional del Prado in Madrid loaned a painting by El Greco to the Israel Museum in Jerusalem. A special evening was held in the presence of Yitzhak Navon, the fifth President of the State of Israel and Alvaro Iranzo Gutierrez, ambassador of Spain in Israel.

== Bilateral trade ==
Spanish apparel retailer Zara opened their first store in 1997 in Tel Aviv. As of 2020, Zara has 25 branches in the country.

In 2010, bilateral trade totalled 1.69 billion euros, with 853 million euros of Israeli exports to Spain and 836 million euros of Spanish imports to Israel. In 2011, José Ranero, the economic and commercial advisor at the Spanish Embassy, said he looked forward to more joint projects, especially in technology.

Israel - Spain trade in millions USD-$
	Israel imports Spain exports	Spain imports Israel exports	Total trade value
2023	1927.9	988.8	2916.7
2022	2110.8	1198.4	3309.2
2021	2032.6	1120.8	3153.4
2020	1526.3	874.8	2401.1
2019	1599.9	987.9	2587.8
2018	1584.4	882.6	2467
2017	1717.5	831	2548.5
2016	1577.3	896.1	2473.4
2015	1345.7	786.7	2132.4
2014	1419.3	1036.8	2456.1
2013	1381	1241.1	2622.1
2012	1201.9	1033.4	2235.3
2011	1183.4	984.2	2167.6
2010	975.4	1031.8	2007.2
2009	880.1	940.5	1820.6
2008	959.1	1108	2067.1
2007	811.9	1106	1917.9
2006	749	903	1652
2005	613.7	687.8	1301.5
2004	652.3	616.2	1268.5
2003	624.6	525.4	1150
2002	637.8	399.7	1037.5

== Public opinion ==
According to a 2025 Pew Research Center survey, 18% of people in Spain had a favorable view of Israel, while 75% had an unfavorable view; 11% had confidence in Israeli Prime Minister Benjamin Netanyahu, while 84% did not.

== Resident diplomatic missions ==
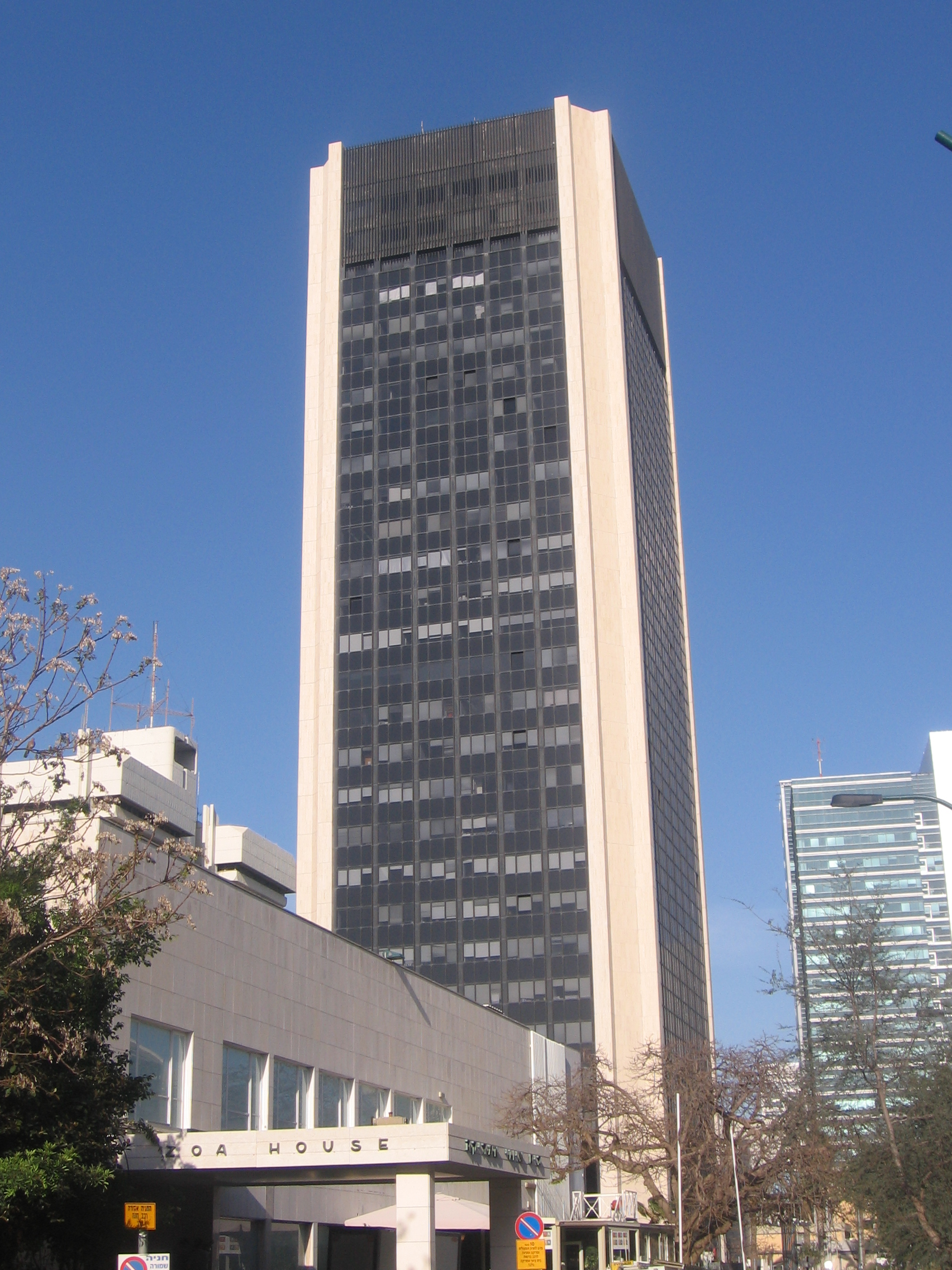
Daniel Frisch building in Tel Aviv, the 18th floor serves as home to Spain's Embassy in Israel.

- Israel has an embassy in Madrid.
- Spain has an embassy in Tel Aviv.

The Consulate General of Spain in East Jerusalem was created in 1853 in order "to reach an understanding with the Spanish Franciscan friars residing in Palestine, in order to zealously uphold the interests of the Church and the State and to prevent the ancient rights and privileges of my Crown in the Holy Places from being neglected". Spain does not recognize Israeli sovereignty over Jerusalem and the formal establishment of diplomatic relations in 1986 was agreed under the premise that they will "in no way affect to the status of the Consulate General of Spain in Jerusalem".

== See also ==
- International recognition of Israel
- Israel–European Union relations
- Palestine–Spain relations
