= Embassy of Palestine, Lima =

Diplomatic mission of Palestine in Peru

Embassy of Palestine to Peru
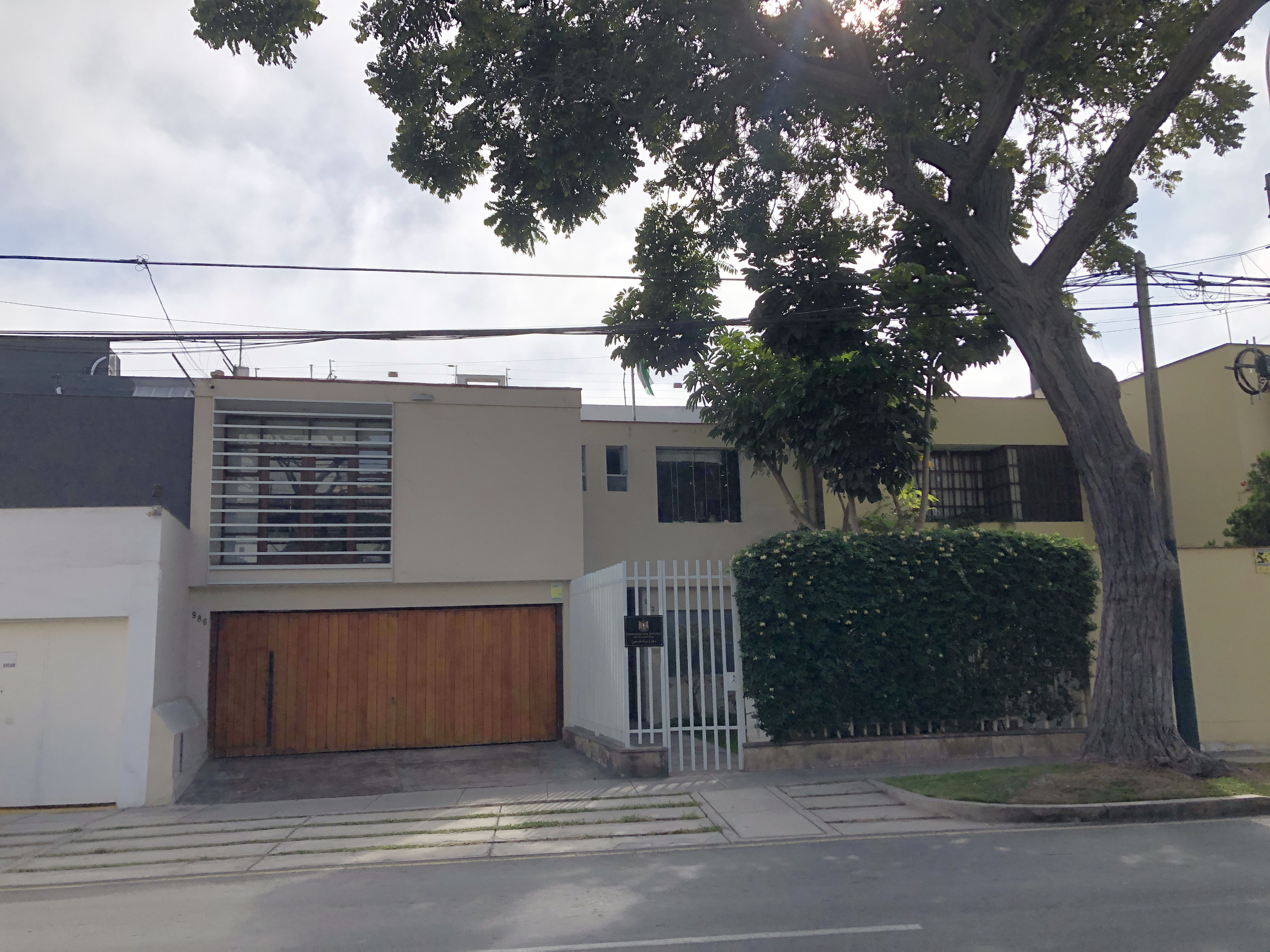
- Location: San Isidro, Lima, Peru
- Address: Calle La República 982
- Opened: 1979 (office); 2015 (embassy)
- Website: Official website

The Embassy of the State of Palestine in Peru represents the permanent diplomatic mission of the State of Palestine in Peru. It is located at Calle La República 982, in San Isidro District, Lima.

== History ==
The first Palestinian representation in Peru opened in 1979, under the left-leaning Revolutionary Government of the Armed Forces of Peru, as the office of the Palestine Liberation Organization (PLO), which at the time had no diplomatic status.

In 1998, an agreement to host a Special Delegation of the PLO was signed, and in 2000, Javier Pérez de Cuéllar raised the level of the delegation with all the privileges granted to countries in embassies accredited in Peru, making the delegation a de facto embassy. Ollanta Humala later officially recognised the State of Palestine on January 24, 2011.

Peru does not have a representation in Ramallah or any other city in Palestine, although former president Pedro Castillo announced the intention of the country to open an embassy in 2022.

== List of representatives ==
The Ambassador Extraordinary and Plenipotentiary of the State of Palestine in Peru (Arabic: سفير دولة فلسطين لدى البيرو; Spanish: Embajador Extraordinario y Plenipotenciario del Estado de Palestina en el Perú) is the foremost representative of the Palestinian government to the Government of Peru.

Name	Portrait	Term begin	Term end	President	Notes
1979: Palestine Liberation Organization office opened in Lima
Issam Besseiso		1979	1984	Yasser Arafat	First PLO representative to Peru; not officially recognised as a diplomat. He was appointed to the PLO's office in Sofia, leaving in 1984. His farewell party was attended by congressman Miguel Ángel Mufarech and then Mayor of Lima, Alfonso Barrantes.
Bassim Abd-El-Rajman		1984	1984	Yasser Arafat	As PLO representative to Peru. A member of Fatah, he was in Karachi until February 1984, when he was reportedly expelled alongside three other PLO members by the Pakistani government.
Hussein Abdel Khalik		December 1984	c. 1991	Yasser Arafat	As PLO representative to Peru. He arrived in late December 1984 with his wife, Francisca Zanor, and his daughter, being received by the Algerian ambassador to Peru, Mustafé Lecheraf, and Palestinian representatives.
Sabri Atieh		1992	1994	Yasser Arafat	As PLO representative to Peru.
Walid Ibrahim Muaqqat		May 14, 1998	May 25, 2001	Yasser Arafat	As Chief Ambassador of the Special Mission of the Palestine Liberation Organization in Peru. On May 14, 1998, he signed the agreement that established the PLO's delegation in Lima and in 2000 it was elevated to a "special diplomatic mission."
Walid Ibrahim Muaqqat		May 25, 2001	December 31, 2005	Yasser Arafat	As Chief Ambassador of the Special Mission of Palestine in Peru.
Walid Abdel Rahim		March 4, 2006	December 11, 2010	Mahmoud Abbas	As Chief Ambassador of the Special Mission of Palestine in Peru.
24 January 2011: Diplomatic relations between Palestine and Peru formally established
Walid Abdel Rahim		December 11, 2010	2014	Mahmoud Abbas	First ambassador prior to Peru's diplomatic recognition of Palestine.
Walid Ibrahim Muaqqat		April 23, 2015	Jan 2025	Mahmoud Abbas	As ambassador. He presented his credentials on April 23, 2015.
Abdal Nasser al Araj		April 3, 2015	Incumbent		As ambassador. He presented his credentials on April 3 2025.

== See also ==
- Palestine–Peru relations
