= List of exports of Spain =

Exports of Spain by product category (2019) Chemical products Transportation Machines Mineral products Plastics and rubbers Metals Foodstuffs Precious metals Textiles Instruments Animal products Vegetable products Paper goods Footwear and headwear Miscellaneous Stone and glass Wood products Animal and vegetable bi-products Animal hides Arts and antiques Weapons

The following is a list of the exports of Spain. Data is for 2019, in millions of United States dollars, as reported by International Trade Centre. Currently the top thirty exports are listed.

#	Product	Value
1	Cars	34,360
2	Unspecified commodities	19,107
3	Refined petroleum	15,541
4	Vehicle parts	10,633
5	Pharmaceuticals	9,308
6	Trucks	5,807
7	Pig meat	5,129
8	Aircraft, helicopters, and spacecraft	3,707
9	Non-Knit Women's Suits	3,658
10	Citrus fruits	3,580
11	Olive oil	3,281
12	Unglazed Ceramics	3,155
13	Wine	3,066
14	Aircraft parts	3,031
15	Rubber tyres	2,389
16	Insulated Wire	2,357
17	Other vegetables	2,303
18	Human or animal blood	2,302
19	Perfumes	2,269
20	Polyacetals	1,926
21	Berries	1,925
22	Iron or steel structures	1,910
23	Footwear	1,700
24	Biodiesel	1,648
25	Knitted/Crocheted clothing	1,642
26	Self-Propelled Rail Transport	1,601
27	Low-voltage protection equipment	1,594
28	Spark-ignition engines	1,548
29	Coal tar oil	1,544
30	Furniture	1,533

== See also ==
- Economy of Spain
