= Walid Abdel Rahim =

Palestinian diplomat (1955–2021)

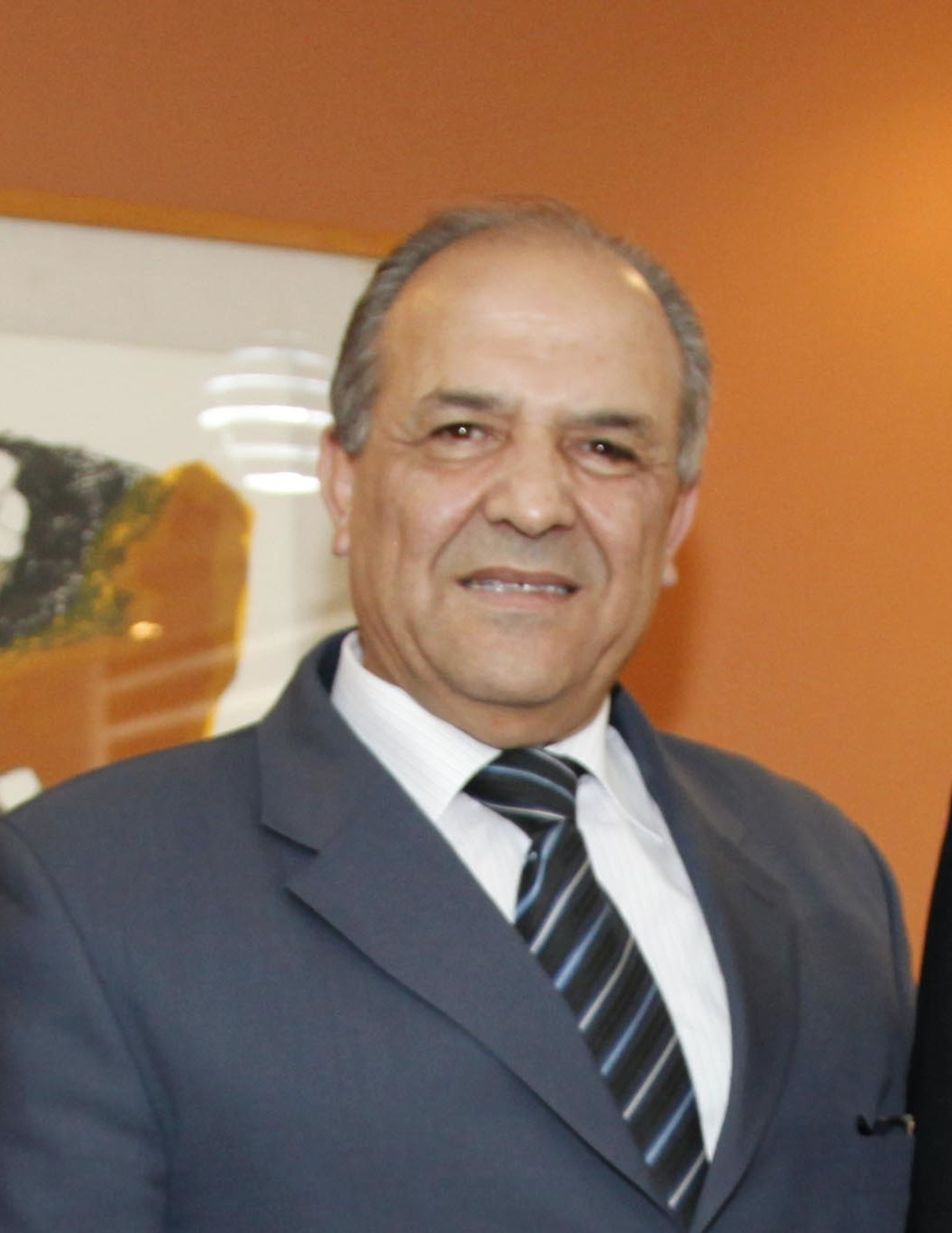

1st Ambassador of Palestine to Peru
- In office March 4, 2006 – 2014
- Preceded by: Position established
- Succeeded by: Walid Muaqqat

1st Ambassador of Palestine to Ecuador
- In office 2008–2013
- Preceded by: Position established
- Succeeded by: Hani Al Remawi

2nd Ambassador of Palestine to Uruguay
- In office December 5, 2014 – February 10, 2021
- Preceded by: Walid Muaqqat (concurrent)
- Succeeded by: Nadya Rasheed

Personal details
- Born: 1955 Zarqa, Jordan
- Died: February 10, 2021 Amman, Jordan
- Education: University of Havana
- Awards: Order of the Sun of Peru

Walid Salim Youssef Abdel Rahim (Kunya: Abu Khaled; Zarqa, 1955 — Amman February 10, 2021) was a Palestinian–Jordanian journalist and diplomat. He served as the first ambassador of the State of Palestine to Peru between 2006 (formally since 2010) and 2014, and to Uruguay from 2014 until his death.

== Biography ==
He studied journalism and media at the University of Havana in Cuba, and worked on the staff of the Embassy of Palestine in Cuba until 2005, when he became chargé d'affaires of the embassy of Palestine in Nicaragua.

On October 31, 2005, he was granted the rank of ambassador and appointed head of the Special Mission of Palestine in Peru. On March 4, 2006, he presented his credentials to the Peruvian Minister of Foreign Affairs Óscar Maúrtua.

He is considered the first ambassador of Palestine to Ecuador, where he presented his credentials to then President Rafael Correa on November 30, 2008, as a non-resident ambassador based in Lima.

He presented his credentials as Ambassador of the State of Palestine to Uruguay on December 5, 2014.

On February 12, 2015, he was awarded the Order of the Sun of Peru, Grand Cross, on the occasion of the end of his diplomatic mission in Peru.

== Death ==
The Palestinian Ministry of Foreign Affairs and Expatriates announced his death in the Jordanian capital of Amman on February 10, 2021, following a severe illness, and he was buried in the Shafa Badran cemetery, north of the city, on February 11, 2021.
