= Palestine–Spain relations =

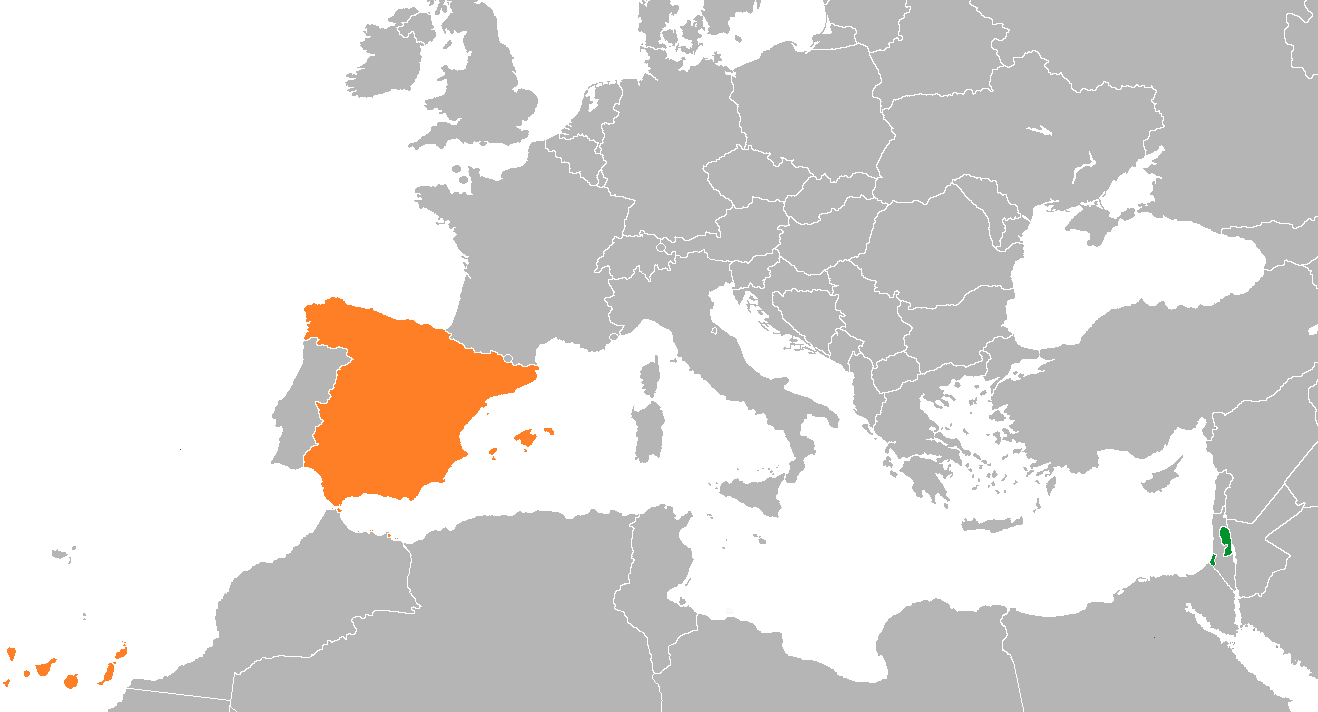

- Palestine: Spain

Palestine–Spain relations are the bilateral and diplomatic relations between these two countries. Palestine has an embassy in Madrid. Spain has, since 1853, a consulate general in East Jerusalem that serves the West Bank, Gaza and Jerusalem. Spain recognised the state of Palestine on 28 May 2024.

== Diplomatic relations ==
Excluded from UN membership until 1955, Spain did not take part in the 1947 Partition Plan for Palestine. (Note: Republican diplomat Pablo de Azcárate, repudiated by the Francoist regime, did however play an important role in the Palestine Commission.) The Francoist regime tended to endorse Arab positions in Mandatory Palestine, a stance reinforced after the killing of the Spanish deputy consul in Jerusalem in an attack by Yishuv self-proclaimed terrorist group Haganah in January 1948.

In 1974, Spain sided with the national rights of Palestinians at the UN during the vote of the general assembly resolutions 3236 and 3237. During the early stages of the Transition, and vis-à-vis the recognition of the State of Israel, the Spanish government was pressured by multiple sides to either favour or abandon/delay the recognition of the State of Israel.

Spanish prime minister Adolfo Suárez favoured nonetheless a political line of continuity regarding the Israel-Palestine conflict. He was the first Western European leader to host a visit from PLO Chairman Yasser Arafat in September 1979, prompting criticism from Spanish Jewish communities.

Following its recognition of the State of Israel in 1986, Spain was able to play a role of mediator in the Israel-Palestine conflict.

Diplomatic relations between Spain and the Palestinian Authority can be described as excellent. Good relations with Israel and the ANP were decisive when choosing Madrid as the venue for the Madrid Conference of 1991 that would open the peace talks between Palestinians and Israelis.

The numerous visits to Spain of the top Palestinian leaders are proof of the good state of diplomatic relations between the two countries. Yasser Arafat in the past and Mahmoud Abbas have now visited Madrid with an at least annual rate and have also received the Spanish authorities in Ramallah and Gaza on repeated occasions. Presidents Aznar and Zapatero visited Ramallah in 1999 and 2009 respectively. In April 2011, it was the Princes of Asturias who were officially received at the Muqata’a Presidential Complex in Ramallah by President Abbas. In August 2011, Foreign Minister Trinidad Jiménez told El País about Spain's intentions for recognition, adding that it would give Palestinians much-needed hope for their future state.

The work of the Spanish Cooperation in the next decade in the Palestinian Territories was also proof of the excellent relations between Spain and the Palestinian Territories. In this sense, the Spanish and Palestinian civil societies maintained intense contacts through the presence of Spanish cooperators who developed his work in the Palestinian Territories as well as through the numerous Palestinian citizens who have been beneficiaries of the Spanish Cooperation scholarship system and who have established intense contacts during their academic stays in Spain. On 20 November 2014, the Spanish parliament approved a non-binding motion to recognize Palestine by a vote of 319–2.

According to a Reuters report in 2020, Spain quietly supported normalizing ties with Palestine as part of a larger bloc of friendlier EU countries, but has not publicly stated so.

On 27 October 2023, Spain was one of 121 countries to vote in favor of a General Assembly resolution calling for an immediate ceasefire to the Gaza war.

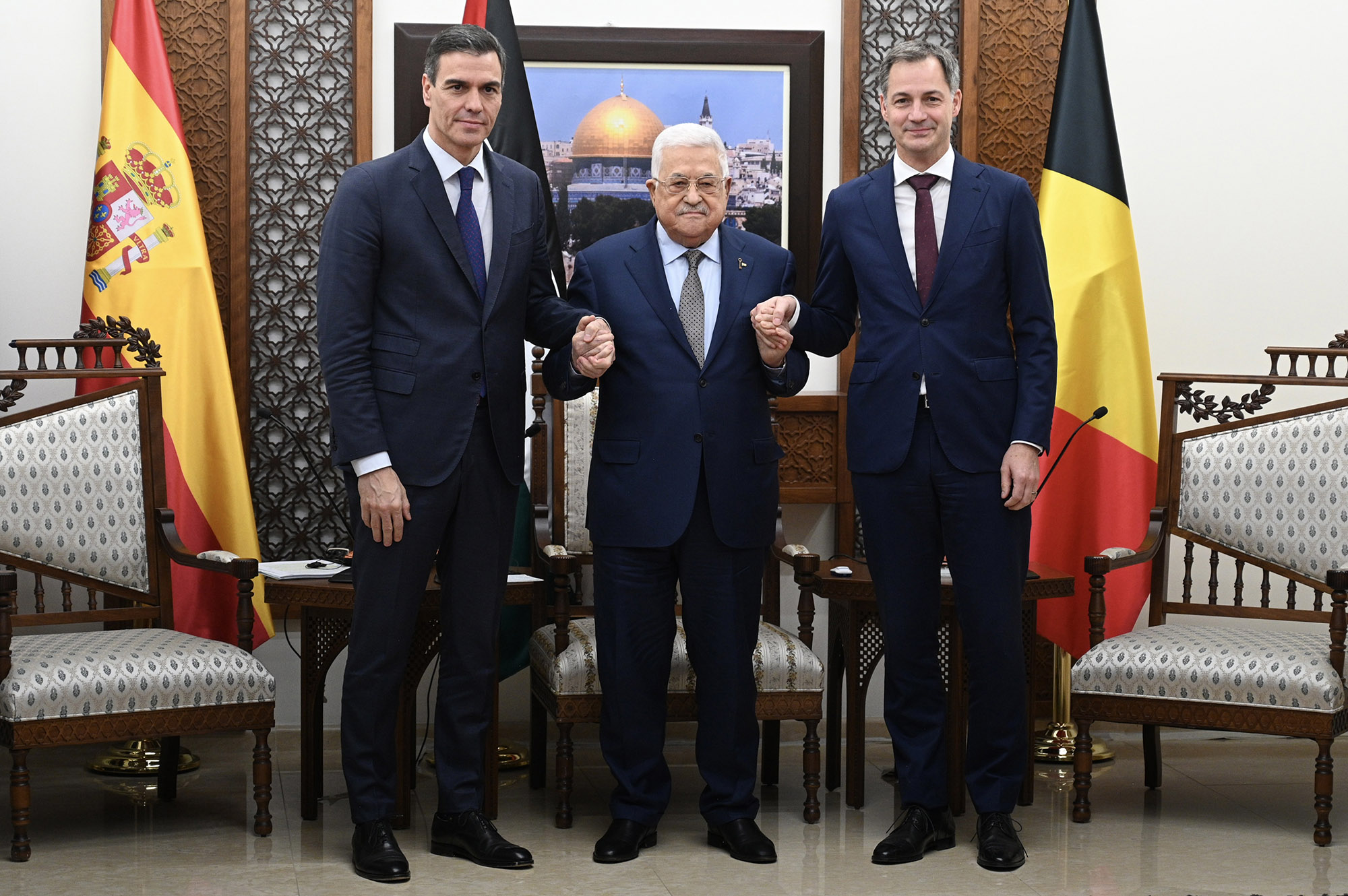
Spanish prime minister Pedro Sánchez and Belgian prime minister Alexander De Croo meet with Mahmoud Abbas in November 2023

In November 2023, following his reelection as Prime Minister, Pedro Sánchez announced the intention of his government to recognize the State of Palestine "any second now", and told so to Israeli PM Benjamin Netanyahu. Since the start of the Gaza war, Spain has been one of the leading voices in the support for the recognition of a Palestinian State within the European Union.

Spain recognized Palestine as an independent country on 28 May 2024. Spain and Ireland are currently persuading other countries in Europe to join them in recognizing Palestine by July 2024 at the latest. Upon the meeting of the Council of Ministers that formally recognized the State of Palestine on 28 May 2024, the Spanish government stated the hope of seeing the West Bank and Gaza "connected by a corridor", with East Jerusalem as the Palestinian capital and the Palestinian Authority as its government, pledging not to recognize any change to the pre-1967 borders not agreed by the parties. An official communication by the Spanish Ministry of Foreign Affairs to the Palestinian diplomatic mission informing that Palestine "enjoys all the privileges and immunities pertaining to States" followed suit on 1 June 2024.

On 16 September 2024, Palestine's ambassador to Spain, Husni Abdel Wahed, presented his credentials to King Felipe VI after Madrid's official recognition of Palestinian statehood in May. The ambassador was welcomed to the Royal Palace of Madrid for the customary ceremony for recently appointed foreign ambassadors to Spain.

Both countries held their first intergovernmental meeting in La Moncloa in November 2024. Four MoUs on employment, education, youth, and agriculture were signed and Spain committed €75 million in aid to Palestine via AECID.

== Economic relations ==
The trade balance is always favorable for Spain, although merchandise traffic between the two countries is insignificant. From the analysis of the Spanish export figures, always with the qualifications indicated, the following data stand out: The total is historically insignificant in absolute terms. Exports to Palestine are directly linked to shipments that were financed with FAD credits. The slowdown in the execution of FAD projects since 2000 has been responsible for the fall in the total value of Spanish exports to the Palestinian Territories; €9 million in 1999, €6 million in 2005, €1.6 million in 2006, and the same figure in 2007. During 2009 and 2010 the figures have been very small (€0.90 and €3.72) respectively. In 2012, Spanish exports amounted to 7 million euros. Imports by Spain of Palestinian products are almost non-existent; In fact, in the last three years and until October 2013 there have been no purchases by Spain.

== Cooperation ==
The overall objective of the Spanish Cooperation with the TTPP is the creation of a viable Palestinian State, mainly through the fight against poverty (economic and social development), the strengthening of State structures and institutions and the support to society civil in the field of democratic values and peace building.

The commitment of the Spanish people to the Palestinian people has been constant, and began in 1994 in Tunisia, with the signing of the “Memorandum of Understanding concerning the Hispano-Palestine Cooperation ”, this commitment renewed and consolidated by virtue of the five Mixed Commissions signed to date. This commitment to the Palestinian people has materialized in recent years in a very significant increase in official development aid that has gone from 31 million euros in 2005 to 53 million euros in 2011 of total net ODA, thus becoming Spain in the second largest donor in the European Union to the TT.PP.

The V Meeting of the Joint Hispanic-Palestinian Commission for Cultural, Educational, Scientific and Technical Cooperation, held in Madrid in January 2008, highlighted the Spanish commitment to a just and peaceful solution to the conflict under International Law, as well as the creation of a sovereign and independent Palestinian State, with recognized borders, which coexists in peace and security with Israel, in accordance with the United Nations Resolutions, the Madrid Peace Conference (1991) and the Arab Peace Initiative (2002). The aforementioned V Mixed Commission, included as priority areas of action "Basic Services", "Agriculture" and "Culture for Development", highlighting as strategic lines of action, the sectors "Governance" and the Support to Civil Society in matters of "Peace Building". These priority areas of action make up the current Spanish Cooperation program in TTPP. Spain also supports Palestinian refugees through the UNRWA (United Nations Agency for Palestinian Refugees), which provides basic education, health and social protection services to Palestinian refugees in Gaza, the West Bank, Lebanon, Syria and Jordan.

In 2012 and 2013, Official Development Assistance for TT.PP. has reached 16 and 7.9 million euros, respectively, in a context of budget cuts, and compliance with the deficit targets set by the Government. In 2014 the VI Palestine Hispanic Mixed Commission will be signed, coinciding with the culmination of the process of identification and drafting of the Spanish Cooperation Association Framework with TTPP (2014-2017). The Partnership Framework will continue and deepen the development of public institutions, good governance, peace and security, gender equity as well as social development and Palestinian economic stability, all in order to revalidate our commitment to the establishment of an independent and democratic Palestinian State.

== Spanish support for humanitarian efforts in Gaza ==
In September 2025, Spanish Foreign Minister José Manuel Albares reaffirmed Spain’s commitment to supporting humanitarian efforts in Gaza. Speaking at a diplomatic meeting in Madrid, he emphasized the country’s advocacy for the creation of a humanitarian corridor to the Gaza Strip. He called on the international community to intensify efforts to end the blockade. Albares further stated that the Spanish government would utilize all available diplomatic and consular resources to assist Spanish citizens participating in the Global Sumud Flotilla. This international civil initiative departed from Barcelona to deliver humanitarian aid to Gaza.

== See also ==
- Foreign relations of Palestine
- Foreign relations of Spain
- International recognition of Palestine
- Israel–Spain relations
