= Argentina–Palestine relations =

- Argentina: Palestine

Diplomatic relations between Argentina and Palestine have existed since 1982. There is a small Palestinian community in Argentina as part of the larger Arab community. On 6 December 2010, the government of Argentina officially recognized the State of Palestine as "free and independent", "within the borders existing in 1967. A Palestinian embassy was opened on 15 November 1999.

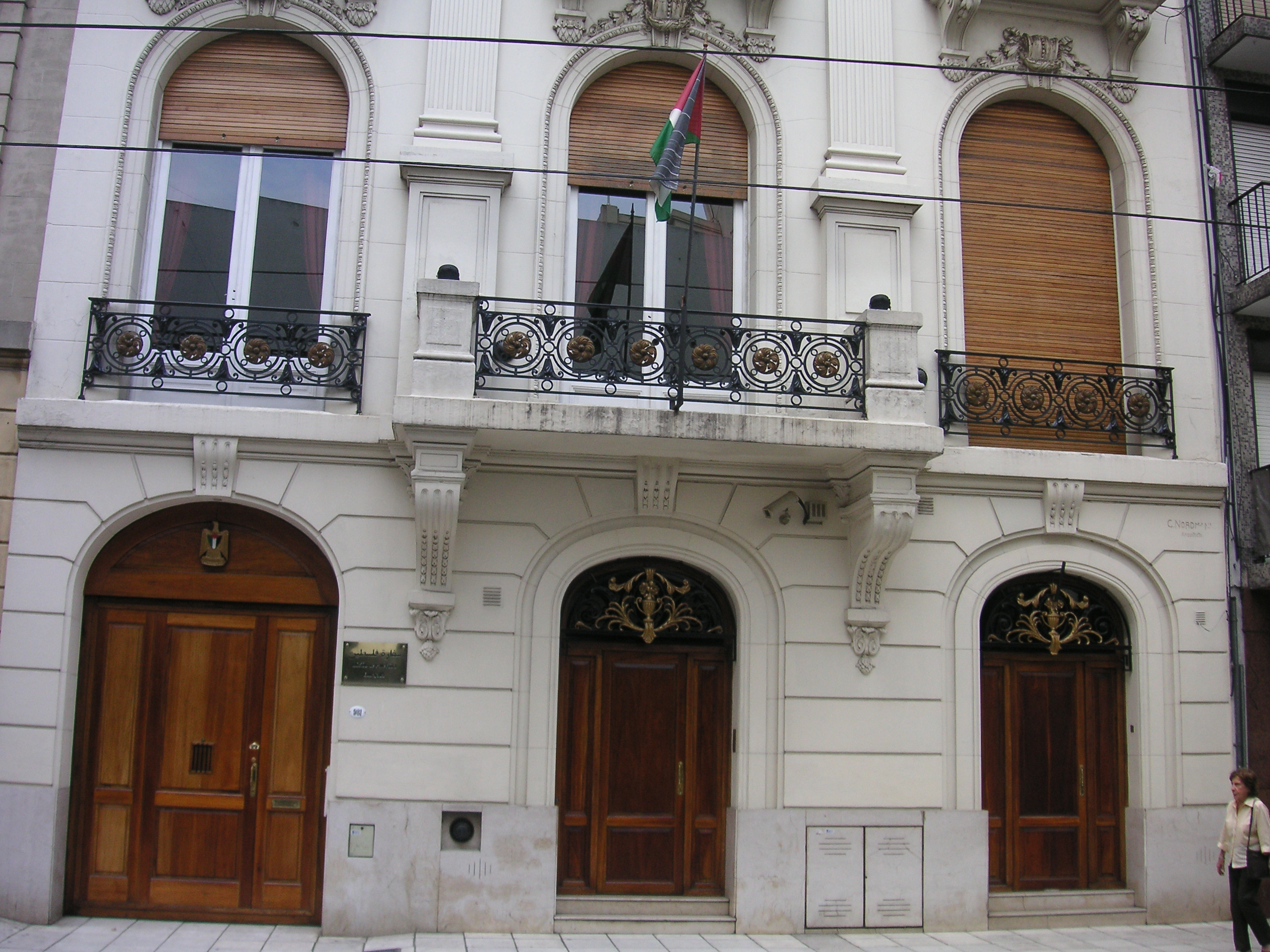
Embassy of Palestine in Buenos Aires

== History ==
In 1947, Argentina abstained in the vote on the United Nations Plan for the Partition of Palestine. In December 1976, the Argentine ambassador to the United Nations, Carlos Ortiz de Rozas, endorsed two resolutions, one condemning the Israeli policy of occupation of territories, and another recognizing the PLO as an "essential actor for the realization of a fair and durable agreement in the region. In 1982, Argentina condemned the Israeli aggression in Lebanon and the massacring of Palestinians in Beirut. At the same time the Arab countries showed their diplomatic support to Argentina for the claim of the Malvinas Islands (Falklands). In 1995 Argentina granted its recognition to the Palestinian Authority. In 2008, Argentina opened its diplomatic representation in Ramallah. In 2011 Argentina voted in favor of the incorporation of Palestine into UNESCO as a full member, and before the General Assembly of the United Nations, Cristina Fernández de Kirchner asked for the approval of the Palestinian state as a full member of the UN.

In May 2024, President Javier Milei's government broke with Argentina's previous position on Palestine, voting against recognition of Palestinian state at United Nations. The vote was in line with the country's pro-Israel shift in its foreign policy.

== Resident diplomatic missions ==
- Palestine has an embassy in Buenos Aires.
- Representative office of the Argentine Republic to the Palestinian Authority in Ramallah.

== See also ==
- Arab Argentines
