= Lists of ambassadors of Israel =

Lists of ambassadors of Israel may refer to:

== General ==
- List of Israeli ambassadors

== A ==
- List of ambassadors of Israel to Albania
- List of ambassadors of Israel to Angola
- List of ambassadors of Israel to Antigua and Barbuda
- List of ambassadors of Israel to Argentina
- List of ambassadors of Israel to Armenia
- List of ambassadors of Israel to Australia
- List of ambassadors of Israel to Austria
- List of ambassadors of Israel to Azerbaijan

== B ==
- List of ambassadors of Israel to the Bahamas
- List of ambassadors of Israel to Barbados
- List of ambassadors of Israel to Belarus
- List of ambassadors of Israel to Belgium
- List of ambassadors of Israel to Belize
- List of ambassadors of Israel to Bolivia
- List of ambassadors of Israel to Bosnia and Herzegovina
- List of ambassadors of Israel to Brazil
- List of ambassadors of Israel to Bulgaria
- List of ambassadors of Israel to Burkina Faso
- List of ambassadors of Israel to Burundi

== C ==
- List of ambassadors of Israel to Cambodia
- List of ambassadors of Israel to Cameroon
- List of ambassadors of Israel to Canada
- List of ambassadors of Israel to the Central African Republic
- List of ambassadors of Israel to Chile
- List of ambassadors of Israel to China
- List of ambassadors of Israel to Colombia
- List of ambassadors of Israel to the Republic of Congo
- List of ambassadors of Israel to the Democratic Republic of the Congo
- List of ambassadors of Israel to Costa Rica
- List of ambassadors of Israel to Croatia
- List of ambassadors of Israel to Cuba
- List of ambassadors of Israel to Cyprus
- List of ambassadors of Israel to the Czech Republic

== D ==
- List of ambassadors of Israel to Denmark
- List of ambassadors of Israel to the Dominican Republic

== E ==
- List of ambassadors of Israel to Ecuador
- List of ambassadors of Israel to Egypt
- List of ambassadors of Israel to El Salvador
- List of ambassadors of Israel to Eritrea
- List of ambassadors of Israel to Estonia
- List of ambassadors of Israel to Eswatini
- List of ambassadors of Israel to Ethiopia
- List of ambassadors of Israel to the European Union

== F ==
- List of ambassadors of Israel to Fiji
- List of ambassadors of Israel to Finland
- List of ambassadors of Israel to France

== G ==
- List of ambassadors of Israel to Gabon
- List of ambassadors of Israel to the Gambia
- List of ambassadors of Israel to Georgia
- List of ambassadors of Israel to Germany
- List of ambassadors of Israel to Ghana
- List of ambassadors of Israel to Guatemala
- List of ambassadors of Israel to Guinea

== H ==
- List of ambassadors of Israel to Haiti
- List of ambassadors of Israel to the Holy See
- List of ambassadors of Israel to Honduras
- List of ambassadors of Israel to Hungary

== I ==
- List of ambassadors of Israel to Iceland
- List of ambassadors of Israel to India
- List of ambassadors of Israel to International Organizations
- List of ambassadors of Israel to Ireland
- List of ambassadors of Israel to Italy
- List of ambassadors of Israel to Ivory Coast

== J ==
- List of ambassadors of Israel to Jamaica
- List of ambassadors of Israel to Japan
- List of ambassadors of Israel to Jordan

== K ==
- List of ambassadors of Israel to Kazakhstan
- List of ambassadors of Israel to Kenya
- List of ambassadors of Israel to South Korea
- List of ambassadors of Israel to Kyrgyzstan

== L ==
- List of ambassadors of Israel to Laos
- List of ambassadors of Israel to Latvia
- List of ambassadors of Israel to Lesotho
- List of ambassadors of Israel to Liberia
- List of ambassadors of Israel to Liechtenstein
- List of ambassadors of Israel to Lithuania
- List of ambassadors of Israel to Luxembourg

== M ==
- List of ambassadors of Israel to Malawi
- List of ambassadors of Israel to Malta
- List of ambassadors of Israel to Mauritania
- List of ambassadors of Israel to Mauritius
- List of ambassadors of Israel to Mexico
- List of ambassadors of Israel to Monaco
- List of ambassadors of Israel to Myanmar

== N ==
- List of ambassadors of Israel to the Netherlands
- List of ambassadors of Israel to New Zealand
- List of ambassadors of Israel to Nicaragua
- List of ambassadors of Israel to Nigeria
- List of ambassadors of Israel to North Macedonia
- List of ambassadors of Israel to Norway

== P ==
- List of ambassadors of Israel to Panama
- List of ambassadors of Israel to Paraguay
- List of ambassadors of Israel to Peru
- List of ambassadors of Israel to the Philippines
- List of ambassadors of Israel to Poland
- List of ambassadors of Israel to Portugal

== R ==
- List of ambassadors of Israel to Romania
- List of ambassadors of Israel to Russia
- List of ambassadors of Israel to Rwanda

== S ==
- List of ambassadors of Israel to Senegal
- List of ambassadors of Israel to Serbia
- List of ambassadors of Israel to Seychelles
- List of ambassadors of Israel to Singapore
- List of ambassadors of Israel to Slovakia
- List of ambassadors of Israel to Slovenia
- List of ambassadors of Israel to South Africa
- List of ambassadors of Israel to Spain
- List of ambassadors of Israel to Sri Lanka
- List of ambassadors of Israel to Sweden
- List of ambassadors of Israel to Switzerland

== T ==
- List of ambassadors of Israel to Tanzania
- List of ambassadors of Israel to Thailand
- List of ambassadors of Israel to Timor-Leste
- List of ambassadors of Israel to Trinidad and Tobago
- List of ambassadors of Israel to Turkey
- List of ambassadors of Israel to Turkmenistan

== U ==
- List of ambassadors of Israel to Uganda
- List of ambassadors of Israel to Ukraine
- List of ambassadors of Israel to the United Kingdom
- List of ambassadors of Israel to the United States
- List of ambassadors of Israel to Uruguay
- List of ambassadors of Israel to Uzbekistan

== V–Z ==
- List of ambassadors of Israel to Venezuela
- List of ambassadors of Israel to Vietnam
- List of ambassadors of Israel to Zambia
- List of ambassadors of Israel to Zimbabwe
