= List of ambassadors of Israel to Brazil =

== List of ambassadors ==
- Daniel Zohar-Zonshine 2021-
- Yossi Avraham Shelley 2017 - 2021
- Reda Mansour 2014-2015
- Rafael Eldad 2011 - 2014
- Giora Becher 2008 - 2011
- Tzipora Rimon 2004 - 2008
- Daniel Gazit 2000 - 2004
- Yaacov Keinan 1995 - 2000
- Shaul Ramati 1980 - 1983
- Moshe Erell 1976 - 1980
- Mordekhai Shneeron 1973 - 1976
- Itzhak Harkavi 1971 - 1973
- Shmuel Divon 1966 - 1968
- Arie Eshel 1962 - 1964
- Arie Aroch 1956 - 1959
- Minister David Shaltiel 1952 - 1956

=== Consulate (Rio de Janeiro) ===
- Consul General Eitan Surkis 2000 - 2002
- Consul General Yoel Barnea 1994 - 1998
- Consul General Ehud Gol 1988 - 1991
- Consul General Eliyahu Tabori 1983 - 1988
- Consul General Yaakov Gotal 1978 - 1983
- Consul General Ephraim Dowek 1974 - 1978
- Consul General Itzhak Harkavi 1968 - 1972

=== Consulate (Sao Paulo) ===
- Rafi Erdreich 2021-
- Consul General Dori Goren (2016-2021)
- Consul General Yoel Barnea 2013 - 2016
- Consul General Ilan Sztulman 2010 - 2013
- Consul General Medad Medina 2000 - 2003
- Consul General Dorit Shavit 1994 - 1999
- Consul General Yosef Arad 1991 - 1994
- Consul General Zvi Chazan1987 - 1991
- Consul General Yehuda Yelon 1987 - 1989
- Consul General Zvi Caspi 1984 - 1987
- Consul General Efraim Eldar 1981 - 1984
- Consul General Benjamin Bonney 1977 - 1981
- Consul General Isachar Shamgar 1965 - 1968
