= List of ambassadors of Israel to the Dominican Republic =

== List of ambassadors ==
- Daniel Biran Bayor 2018–present
- Daniel Saban 2015–2018
- Bahij Mansour 2013–2015
- Marco Sermoneta 2010–2013
- Amos Radian 2007–2010
- Yoav Bar-On 2003–2007
- Eliahu Lopez 2000–2003
- Pinhas Lavie 1995–2000
- Yoel Gilat 1992–1995
- Gavriel Levy 1989–1992
- Shmuel Tevet 1986–1989
- Mordechai Palzur 1982–1986
- David Ramin 1979–1982
- Baruch Gilead 1974–1979
- Johanan Bein 1972–1974
- Alexander Dothan 1969–1971
- Avraham Sarlouis 1967–1969
- Binyamin Varon 1964–1967
- Mordekhai Shneeron (Non-Resident, Mexico City) 1960–1963
- Ambassador David Shaltiel (Non-Resident, Mexico City) 1956–1959
- Minister Yossef Keisari (Non-Resident, Mexico City) 1954–1956
