= List of ambassadors of Israel to Uruguay =

Ambassador of Israel to Uruguay
- Coat of Arms of Israel
- Incumbent; Michal Hershkovitz since September 26, 2023
- Nominator: Prime Minister of Israel
- Inaugural holder: Jacob Tsur
- Formation: 1948

The Ambassador from Israel to Uruguay is Israel's foremost diplomatic representative in Uruguay.

== List of ambassadors ==
- Minister Jacob Tsur 1949–1953
- Minister Aryeh Leon Kubowitzki 1953–1955
- Minister Matitiahu Hindes 1956–1957
- Joel Baromi 1957–1958
- Arie Eshel 1958–1960
- Itzhak Harkavi 1960–1963
- Yeshayahu Anug 1963–1965
- Hagai Dikan 1965–1968
- Yaacov Yinon 1968–1970
- Dov Schmorak 1972–1975
- Aharon Ofri 1975–1979
- Netanel Matalon 1979–1984
- Menachem Karmi 1984–1987
- Avraham Toledo 1989–1993
- Mordekhay Artzieli 1993–1995
- Yosef Arad 1997–2001
- Joel Salpak 2001–2005
- Yoel Barnea 2005–2009
- Dori Goren 2009–2014
- Nina Ben-Ami 2014–2018
- Galit Ronen 2018–2019
- Yoed Magen 2019–2023
- Michal Hershkovitz 2023–present

== See also ==
- List of ambassadors of Uruguay to Israel
