= List of ambassadors of Israel to Romania =

Ambassadors list of Israel

The Ambassador from Israel to Romania is Israel's foremost diplomatic representative in Romania.

== List of ambassadors ==
- Lior Ben Dor 2024
- Reuven Azar 2022 - 2024
- David Sarranga 2019 - 2022
- Tamar Sam-Ash 2015 - 2018
- Dan Ben-Eliezer 2010 - 2015
- Oren David 2007 - 2010
- Rodica Radian-Gordon 2003 - 2007
- Sandu Mazor 2001 - 2003
- Avraham Millo 1996 - 2001
- Zvi Mazel 1989 - 1992
- Yosef Govrin 1985 - 1989
- Zvi Brosh 1982 - 1985
- Aba Gefen 1978 - 1982
- Shamay Cahana 1976 - 1978
- Yohanan Cohen 1973 - 1976
- Ambassador Rafael Benshalom 1969 - 1973
- Minister Eliezer Doron 1966 - 1969
- Minister Zvi Ayalon 1964 - 1966
- Minister Katriel Salmon 1961 - 1963
- Minister Shmuel Bendor 1959 - 1961
- Minister Aria Harel 1957 - 1959
- Minister Zeev Argaman 1954 - 1956
- Minister Ehud Avriel 1950 - 1951
- Minister Reuven Rubin 1948 - 1950
