= Rodica Radian-Gordon =

Israeli diplomat

- רודיקה רדיאן-גורדון
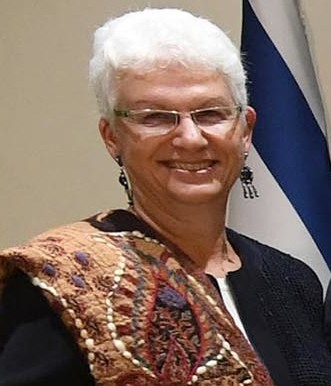

Israeli Ambassador to Spain
- Incumbent
- Assumed office September 2019
- Preceded by: Daniel Kutner

Israeli Ambassador to Andorra
- Incumbent
- Assumed office September 2019
- Preceded by: Daniel Kutner

Israeli Ambassador to Mexico
- In office 2010–2015
- Preceded by: Yosef Livne
- Succeeded by: Jonathan Peled

Israeli Ambassador to the Bahamas
- In office 2010–2015
- Preceded by: Yosef Livne
- Succeeded by: Jonathan Peled

Israeli Ambassador to Romania
- In office 2003–2007
- Preceded by: Sandu Mazor
- Succeeded by: Oren David

Personal details
- Born: 10 July 1957 (age 69) Bucharest, Romania
- Education: Hebrew University of Jerusalem; University of Haifa; JFK School of Government
- Occupation: Diplomat

Rodica Radian-Gordon (Hebrew: רודיקה רדיאן-גורדון; born July 10, 1957, Bucharest, Romania) is the first female Israeli Ambassador to Spain and non-resident accreditation to Andorra, a position she has held since September 2019. She's also been ambassador to Mexico and non-resident to the Bahamas (2010–2015) and Romania (2003–2007).

Radian-Gordon has a doctorate in biochemistry from the Hebrew University of Jerusalem (1987), a master's degree in National Security Studies from the University of Haifa (2001) and attended the John F. Kennedy School of Government as part of the Wexner Leaders Senior Program.
