= Amit Mekel =

Israeli diplomat (born 1980)

- עמית מקל
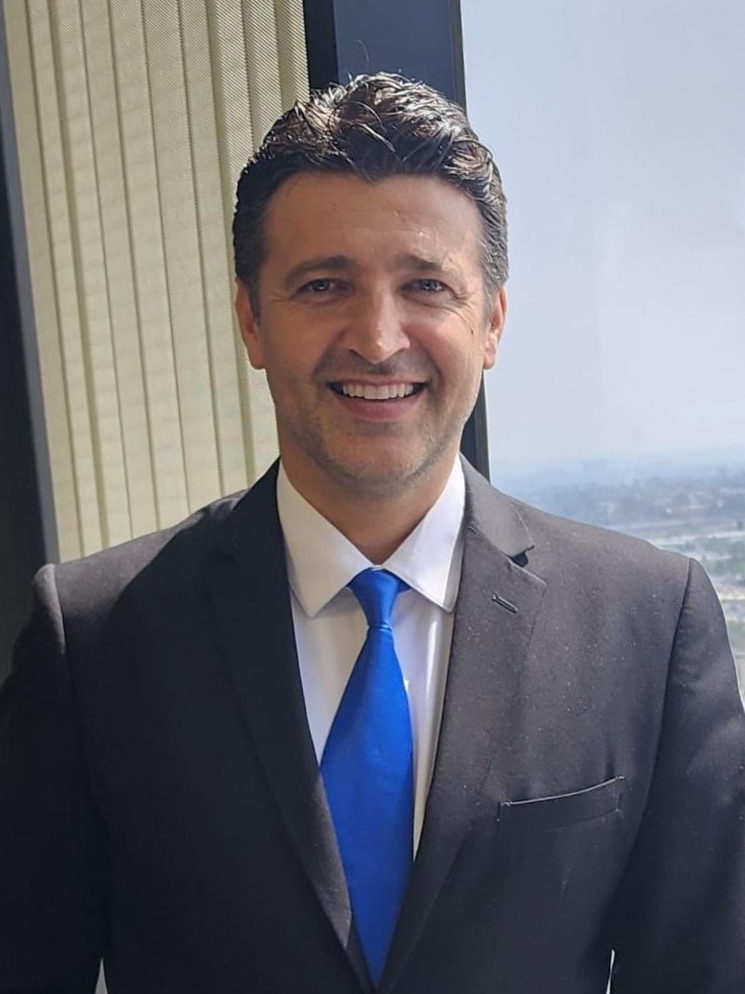
- Mekel in 2024

Israeli Ambassador to Paraguay
- Incumbent
- Assumed office 7 October 2024
- Prime Minister: Benjamin Netanyahu
- Preceded by: Yoed Magen

Personal details
- Born: Amit Makalda; 20 February 1980 (age 46) Daliyat al-Karmel, Israel
- Spouse: Keren Mekel
- Children: 3
- Education: Reichman University; Tel Aviv University
- Occupation: Diplomat

Amit Mekel (Hebrew: עמית מקל; born Amit Makalda, 20 February 1980) is an Israeli diplomat. Since October 2024, he is the Israeli Ambassador to Paraguay.

== Early life and education ==
Mekel was born Amit Makalda, in the Druze village of Daliyat al-Karmel on 20 February 1980. At 14, he moved to Haifa, to study at the Hugim High School. He served as a paratrooper in the Israel Defense Forces for five years and then went to graduate with a bachelor's degree in diplomacy and strategy at Reichman University and a master's degree in diplomacy and security at Tel Aviv University. He is pursuing a doctorate at the Peter F. Drucker and Masatoshi Ito Graduate School of Management at Claremont Graduate University.

== Diplomatic career ==
Mekel's first diplomatic mission was as spokesperson at the Israeli embassy of Cairo, followed by three years as the vice consul general in Sao Paulo, Brazil. He then served as advisor for the Middle East peace process in the Israeli delegation to the European Union and NATO in Brussels, Belgium, followed by serving as the deputy director of European International Division in Israel.

Mekel's first major post was as deputy chief of mission in the Consulate General of Israel in Los Angeles, making him the first Druze and non-Jewish diplomat to hold a senior role representing Israel in the Pacific Southwest. For his contribution to socialization and human rights in this position, he received an honorary doctorate from the Latin University of Theology. In 2024 he was appointed Israeli Ambassador to Paraguay, and he presented his credentials to Santiago Peña, the president of Paraguay on 6 November 2024.

== Personal life ==
Mekel has been married to Keren since 2010, and is the father of three children. Married to a Jewish woman, Mekel chose to raise his children as Jewish, adopting the surname Mekel after his first child's birth. He speaks Hebrew, Arabic, English and Portuguese. In 2024 he released the book The Journey to Israeliness (המסע לישראליות), which tells his life journey.
