= Daniel Biran Bayor =

Israeli diplomat

Daniel Biran Bayor (Hebrew: דניאל בירן ביאור) is the Israeli Ambassador to the Dominican Republic with concurrent appointments to Antigua and Barbuda, Jamaica, Haiti, Dominica, Grenada, St. Lucia, St. Vincent and the Grenadines, and Saint Kitts and Nevis.

Bayor has a Masters in Public Health from Tel Aviv University.
