= List of ambassadors of Israel to Slovakia =

The listed tenures of Israel's ambassadors to Slovakia begin in 1993. The first ambassador, Yosef Govrin, was non-resident in Vienna, while David Granit, who served from 2001 to 2003, was non-resident in Jerusalem.

== List of ambassadors ==
- Yosef Govrin (Non-Resident, Vienna) 1993–1995
- David Granit (Non-Resident, Jerusalem) 2001–2003
- Yael Rubinstein 2003–2005
- Zeev Boker 2006–2010
- Alexander Ben-Zvi 2010–2015
- Zvi Aviner-Vapni 2015–2019
- Eitan Levon 2021–present
