= List of ambassadors of Israel to Mexico =

The Ambassador from Israel to Mexico is Israel's foremost diplomatic representative in Mexico.

== List of ambassadors ==
- Yoad Magen 2026 -
- Einat Kranz Neiger 2023 - 2026
- Tzvi Tal 2019 - 2023
- Jonathan Peled 2015 - 2019
- Rodica Radian-Gordon 2010 - 2015
- Yosef Livne 2006 - 2010
- David Dadonn 2003 - 2006
- Yosef Amihud 2001 - 2003
- Moshe Melamed 1995 - 2001
- David Tourgeman 1991 - 1995
- Dov Shmorak 1987 - 1991
- Moshe Arad 1983 - 1987
- Israel Gur Arieh 1981 - 1983
- Shaul Rosolio 1977 - 1981
- Hanan Einor 1974 - 1977
- Shlomo Argov 1971 - 1974
- Avraham Darom 1968 - 1971
- Shimshon Arad 1964 - 1968
- Simcha Pratt 1963 - 1964
- Mordekhai Shneeron 1960 - 1963
- Ambassador David Shaltiel 1956 - 1959
- Minister Yossef Keisari 1953 - 1956
