= Arieh Levavi =

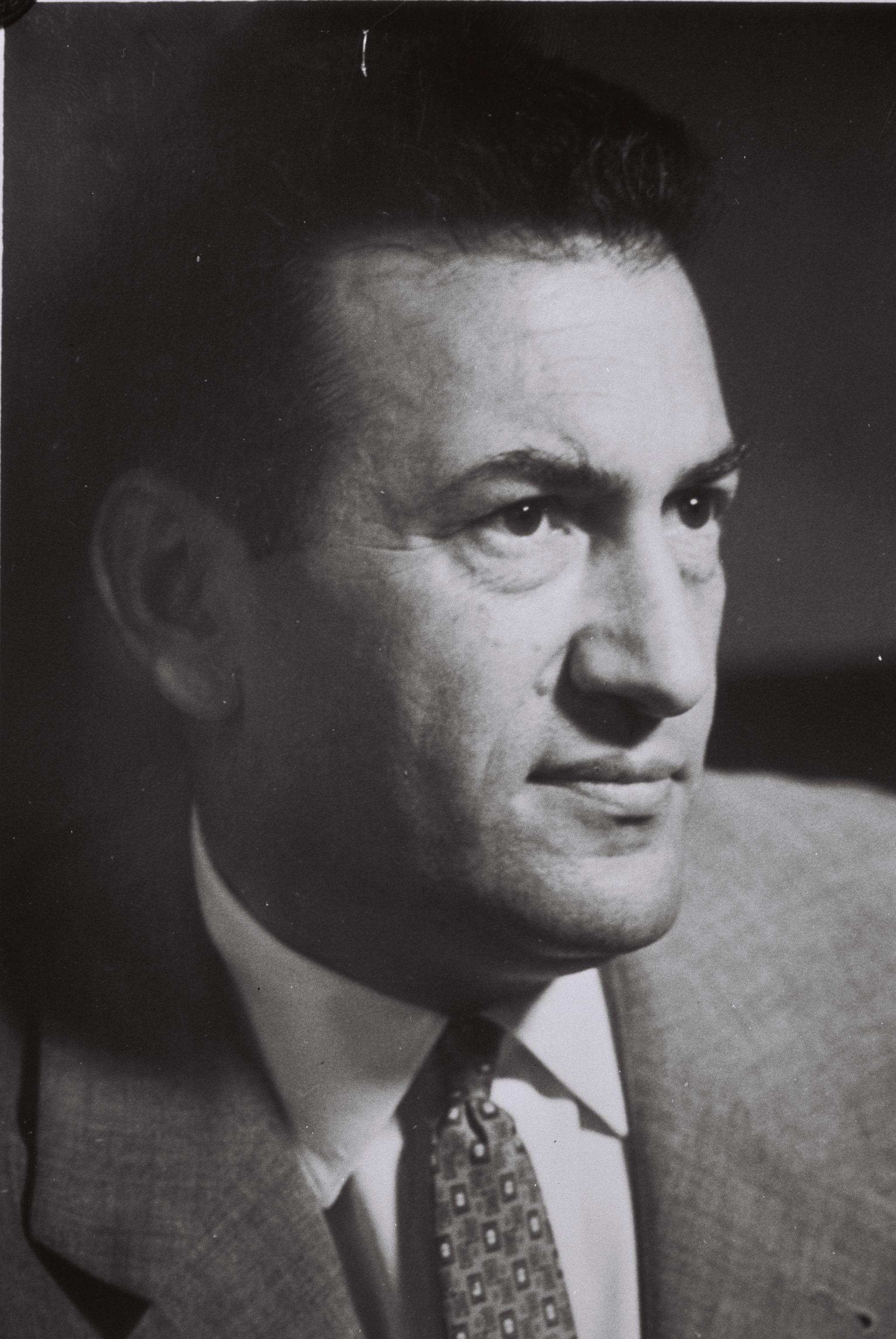
Aryeh levavi, 1959

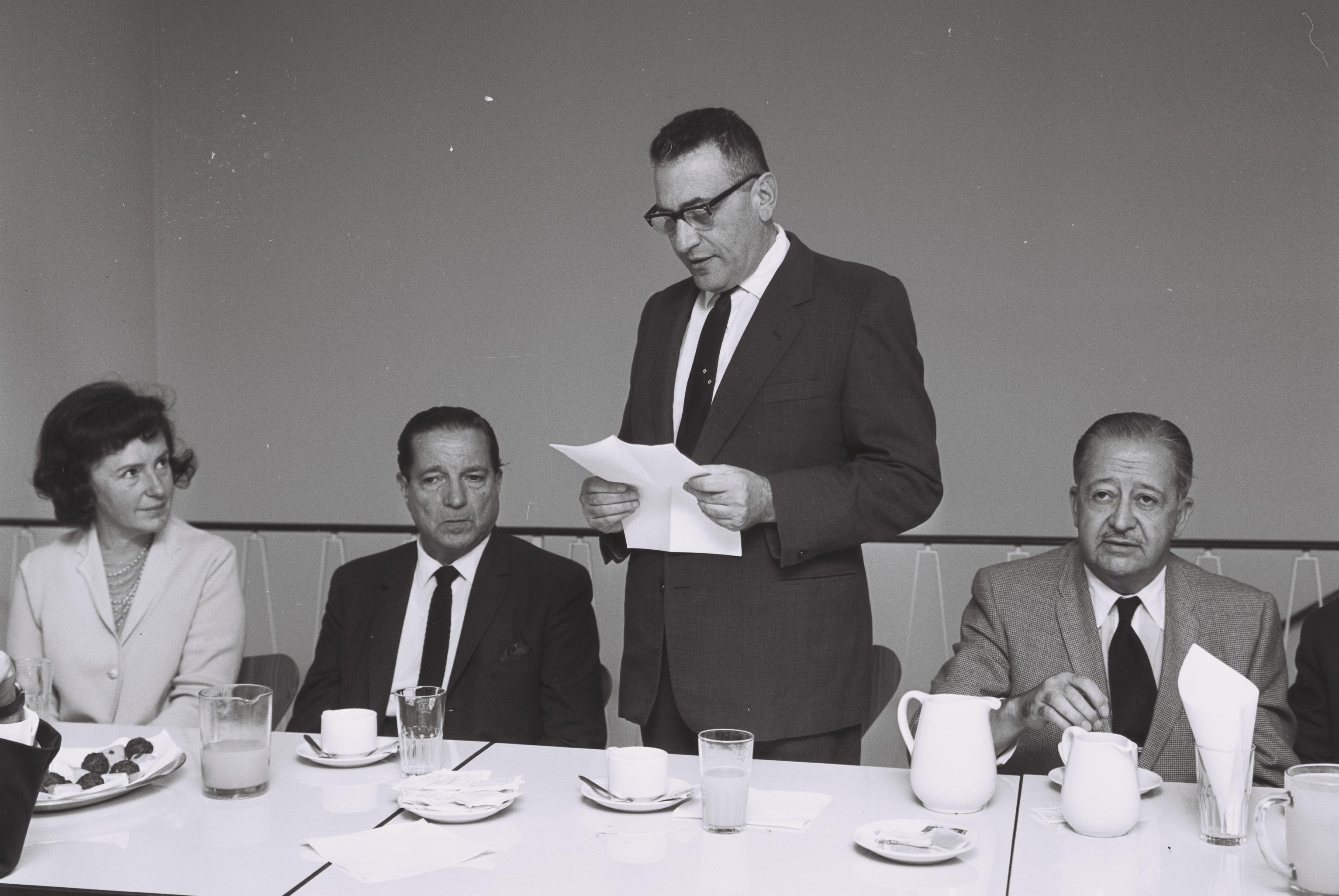
Secretary General of the OAS José Antonio Mora arriving at Lod airport for an official visit to Israel. in photo, Director-General of the Israeli Ministry of Foreign Affairs, Arieh Levavi reading welcome speech. in the left sitting Francisca Fernández-Hall, October 1966

Arieh Levavi (Hebrew: אריה לבבי; 3 June 1912 – 1 February 2009), also known as Aryeh Lieb and Arieh Leibman, was the fourth Director General of Israeli Ministry of Foreign Affairs (1964–1967).

== Early life ==
Levavi was born the youngest of three sons to a wealthy Russian Jewish family of good standing in the community and a lineage connected directly to the famous Rabbi the Vilna Gaon (הגאון מוילנה) in Vilnius, Lithuania, in 1912. Levavi's mother fled with him and his brother to Danzig on the eve of the Russian revolution. Orphaned of both parents Levavi's education and were taken care of by his older brother Fima Leibman. He completed his studies in philosophy, mathematics and physics at the universities of Heidelberg and Danzig in 1930. After graduating he emigrated from Germany to Palestine, where in 1932 he received his Master of Arts in Philosophy, at the Hebrew University of Jerusalem.

He worked as a contributing writer for the daily newspaper Davar in Palestine, until he was sent to Germany on a mission on behalf of the HeHalutz Movement (1936–1938). When he came back to Palestine in 1938 he became involved in integrating and coordinating various Zionist and political movements until the formation of the state of Israel.

== Israeli Ministry of Foreign Affairs ==
After the formation of Israel he became the Head of Eastern Europe in the Israeli Ministry of Foreign Affairs. He was the first secretary and then counselor at the Israeli embassy in Moscow (1948–1950). In 1952 he became the director of Israeli diplomacy for Eastern Europe. From 1954 to 1957 he was the elected Minister Plenipotentiary of Israel to the Yugoslav government.

== Ambassador to Argentina ==
In 1958 he was appointed ambassador to Argentina. He served as the ambassador during the capture of Adolf Eichmann (on 11 May 1960). Immediately after the capture, the Argentine foreign minister requested an unequivocal statement from the Ambassador Levavi as to whether Eichmann had been arrested in Argentina. Levavi replied that he did not know the country in which Eichmann had been arrested, nor did he know whether Israeli citizens had been responsible for his capture. On 22 July 1960, the Argentinean government declared Levavi "persona non grata". Therefore, Levavi was expelled from Argentina.

== Director General of Israel's Ministry of Foreign Affairs ==
Levavi served as director of Israel's Ministry of foreign affairs next and stood at the helm of the ministry during the delicate period around and including the Six Day War.

== See also ==
- List of Israeli ambassadors to Argentina
