= List of ambassadors of Israel to Slovenia =

The Ambassador from Israel to Slovenia is Israel's foremost diplomatic representative in Slovenia.

== List of ambassadors ==
- Zeev Boker (Non-Resident, Jerusalem) 2023 - present
- Eyal Sela (Non-Resident, Jerusalem) 2017 - 2023
- Shmuel Meirom (Non-Resident, Jerusalem) 2010 - 2016
- Aviv Shir-On (Non-Resident, Vienna) 2009 - 2010
- Dan Ashbel (Non-Resident, Vienna) 2006 - 2009
- Yael Rubinstein (Non-Resident, Jerusalem) 2003 - 2005
- David Granit (Non-Resident, Jerusalem) 2001 - 2003
- Yosef Govrin (Non-Resident, Vienna) 1993 - 1995
