= Michael Arnon =

Israeli diplomat and cabinet secretary

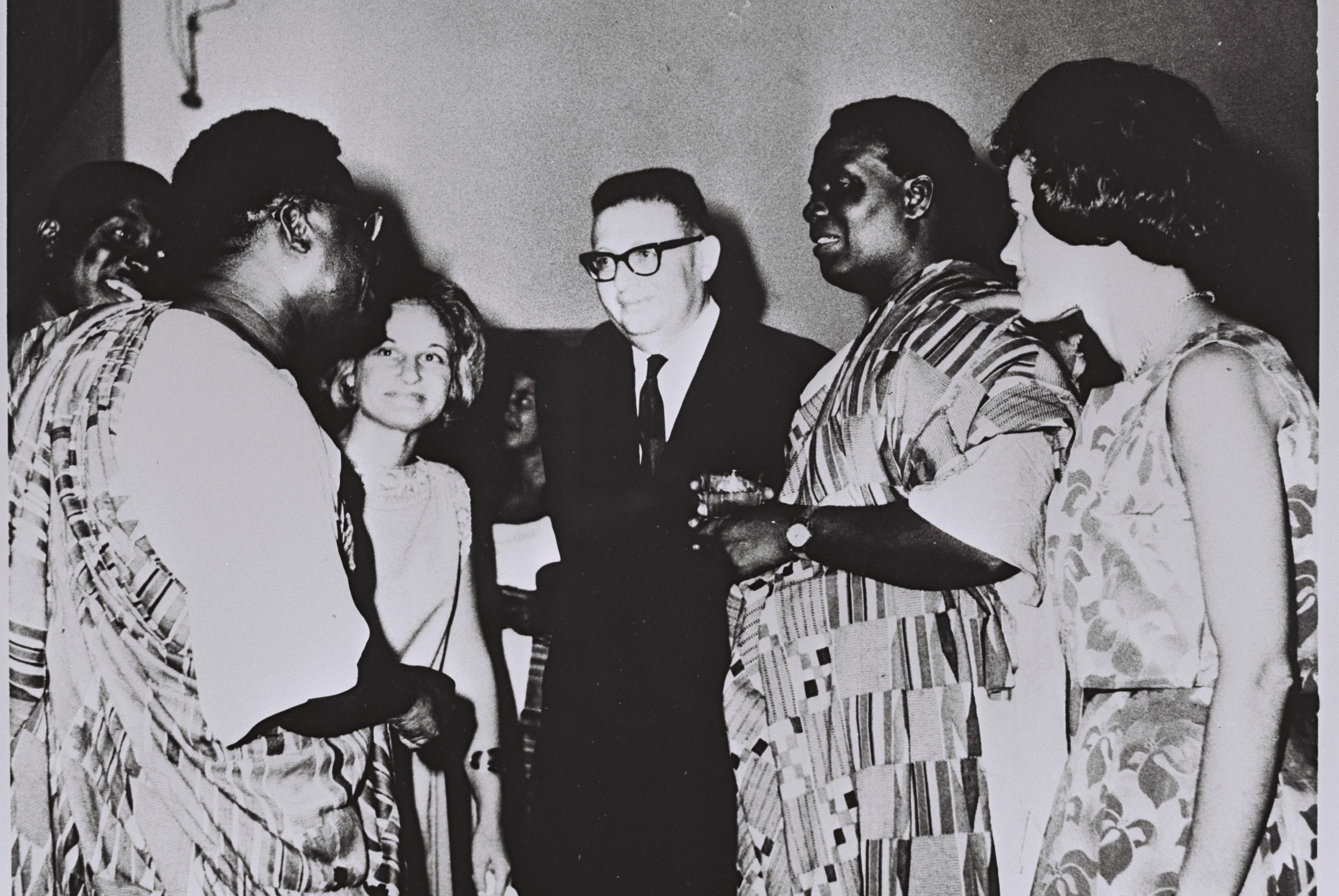
a group photo of Michael Armon and his co civil servant

Michael Arnon (Hebrew: מיכאל ארנון; 1925–2004) was an Israeli diplomat and civil servant. In the years 1968-1974 he served as Cabinet Secretary under prime ministers Levi Eshkol and Golda Meir.

== Biography ==
Arnon was born in Vienna, Austria. He made aliyah in 1938. After leaving for studies in London, he returned to Palestine and worked for the Palestine Post. Following the establishment of the State of Israel he was employed by the Government Press Office and spokesperson for the Ministry of Foreign Affairs.

He gained his first diplomatic post abroad in 1951 and served for three years as the press attache in the Israeli embassy in London. His later diplomatic posts included service as first secretary in the Israeli embassy in Washington DC (1956-1961). He then returned to Jerusalem to head the public diplomacy department. His final and senior posts were as Israel's ambassador to Ghana (1962-1965) and consul general in New York (1965-1968).

From 1968 to 1974 he served as Cabinet Secretary in the governments of prime ministers Levi Eshkol and Golda Meir. After leaving civil service he was made president of the Israel Bonds organization and from 1980 to 1983 the chaired he Israel Securities Authority. Arnon was also appointed as chairman of Continental Bank and president of Ampal-American Israel Corporation.

Arnon died in Jerusalem in 2004.
