= Benny Omer =

Israeli diplomat

Benny Omer (Hebrew: בני עומר) has been the Israeli Ambassador to Nepal since 2017 and from 1998 until 1999. From 2009 until 2013, and previously in 2001, Omer was ambassador to the Côte d’Ivoire and from 2003 until 2007, Cameroon.
