= List of ambassadors of Israel to Bolivia =

== List of ambassadors ==
- Meron Reuben 2002-2004
- Isaac Bachman 1998 - 2001
- Yair Recanati 1995 - 1997
- Yaacov Brakha 1990 - 1991
- Meir Halifa 1988 - 1990
- Nissim Itzhak 1986 - 1987
- Berl Zerubavel 1984 - 1986
- Arie Avidor 1981 - 1984
- Shlomo Levy 1978 - 1981
- Mordechai Palzur 1975 - 1978
- Samuel Hadas 1971 - 1975
- Moshe Yuval (Non-Resident, Lima) 1967 - 1971
- Michael Simon (diplomat) (Non-Resident, Lima) 1960 - 1963
- Tuvia Arazi (Non-Resident, Lima) 1956 - 1960
