= Simcha Dinitz =

Israeli politician (1929–2003)

- שמחה דיניץ
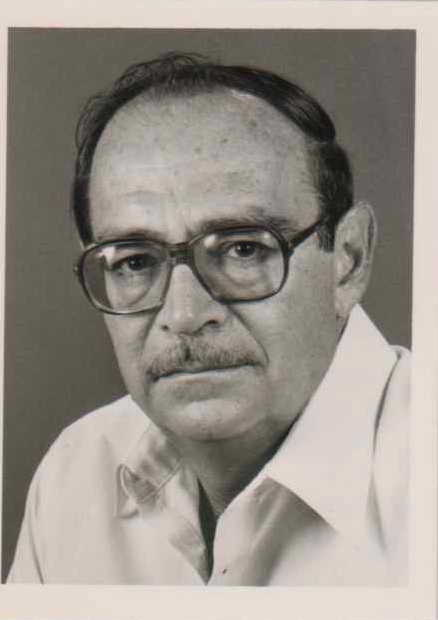

Faction represented in the Knesset
- 1984–1988: Alignment

Personal details
- Born: 23 June 1929 Tel Aviv, Mandatory Palestine (now Israel)
- Died: 23 September 2003 (aged 74) Jerusalem

Simcha Dinitz (Hebrew: שמחה דיניץ; 23 June 1929 – 23 September 2003) was an Israeli statesman and politician. He served as Director General of the Prime Minister's office and political advisor to Prime Minister Golda Meir from 1969 to 1973, before becoming the Israeli Ambassador to the United States from 1973 to 1979. He had an overlapping appointment as the Non resident Ambassador to the Bahamas During the 1980s he was elected to the Knesset.

Dinitz played a major role in coordinating the weapons shipments to Israel received from the U.S. during the Yom Kippur War airlift in 1973, and was a member of the Israeli delegation during the Camp David peace talks with Egypt.

In the 1984 elections he was elected to the Knesset on the Alignment's list and served as a member of its Committee for Foreign and Defense Affairs. However, he resigned from the Knesset shortly before the 1988 elections.

From 1986 Dinitz served as Chairman of the Executive of the World Zionist Organization and Jewish Agency for Israel. During his time in office, almost 1 million Jews (about 7% of the entire Jewish population in the world) emigrated to Israel from the Soviet Union and other countries. In addition, he coordinated Operation Solomon, in which over 14,000 Ethiopian Jews were airlifted to safety in Israel in one day in May 1991.

In 1995, Dinitz was forced to step down after he was indicted for two charges of theft. Dinitz claimed that these were accounting errors, and was tried in the Jerusalem District Court. He was acquitted of one charge and convicted of the other, but the conviction was overturned in an appeal to the Supreme Court of Israel.

Dinitz received his diplomatic training at the Edmund A. Walsh School of Foreign Service at Georgetown University in the United States where he obtained both bachelor's and master's degrees.

A street in the Beit Hakerem neighborhood in Jerusalem is named after him.
