= List of ambassadors of Israel to Malta =

== List of ambassadors ==
- Zeev Boker (Non-Resident, Jerusalem), 2023-present
- Eyal Sela (Non-Resident, Jerusalem), 2016–2023
- Oren David (Non-Resident, Jerusalem), 2011–2016
- Gideon Meir (Non-Resident, Rome), 2006–2011
- Ehud Gol (Non-Resident, Rome), 2001–2006
- Yehuda Millo (Non-Resident, Rome), 1995–2001
- Aviezer Pazner (Non-Resident, Rome), 1991–1995
- Raphael Migdal, 1976–1979
- Ehud Avriel (Non-Resident, Rome), 1966–1968
