= David Cohen (diplomat) =

Israeli diplomat

David Cohen (born February 24, 1948, in Bulgaria) is an Israeli diplomat.

He was the first resident Israeli Ambassador to Albania. At the end of his tenure as Ambassador to Chile in 2009, he was appointed non-resident Ambassador to Albania, Bosnia-Herzegovina and Macedonia, until 2015.

Cohen also served as Ambassador to El Salvador concurrently serving in Belize and to Bulgaria.

== See also ==
- Foreign relations of Israel
