= Ephraim Evron =

Israeli diplomat (1920–1995)

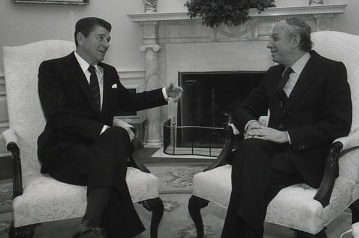
- Evron in the Oval Office with Ronald Reagan, 1982
- Born: June 12, 1920; Haifa, Mandatory Palestine
- Died: July 17, 1995 (aged 75); Ramat Gan, Israel
- Occupation: Diplomat

Ephraim "Eppy" Evron (Hebrew: אפרים עברון; June 12, 1920 – July 17, 1995) was an Israeli diplomat.

== Biography ==
Ephraim Evron was born in Haifa during the British Mandate and studied at the Hebrew Reali School. He served in the British Army during World War II and studied philosophy and Hebrew literature at the Hebrew University of Jerusalem as well as law at the Mandatory law school. He served in the Israel Defense Forces during the 1948 Arab-Israeli War and was wounded during fighting in Jerusalem. Evron served in a variety of positions within the Israeli government and as ambassador to several countries, including the United States from 1978 to 1982. When he was a senior official at the Israeli Ministry of Foreign Affairs in 1975, he met his Mexican counterpart, Emilio Óscar Rabasa, in Rome to discuss United Nations Resolution 3379, which determined that "Zionism is a form of racism", and the UN Declaration of Mexico on the Equality of Women and Their Contribution to Development and Peace, which contained similar language. The furor that the two declarations caused and Mexico's vote in favour of both led the American Jewish community to start a touristic boycott against Mexico. Evron played an important role in the negotiations to solve this issue between Israel, Mexico and the American Jewish community. Evron was married to Rivka Passman in 1943 and had a son and daughter. He died in 1995 in Ramat Gan of a heart attack.

== Diplomatic career ==
- 1949–1951 Political Secretary to Israeli Foreign Minister
- 1951–1952 Secretary to Prime Minister
- 1953–1953 Second Secretary at the Israeli Embassy in Washington D.C.
- 1954–1955 Executive Assistant to Defence Minister
- 1957–1961 Israeli Federation of Labor
- 1961–1965 Counsellor and then Minister at the Israeli Embassy in London
- 1965–1968 Minister at the Israeli Embassy in Washington D.C.
- 1968–1969 Ambassador to Sweden
- 1969–1971 Ambassador to Canada
- 1972–1973 Assistant Director General at the Ministry of Foreign Affairs
- 1973–1977 Deputy Director General
- 1977–1978 Director General
- 1978-1982 Non resident Ambassador to the Bahamas
- 1979–1982 Ambassador to the United States
