= Meron Reuben =

Israeli diplomat (born 1961)

- מירון ראובן
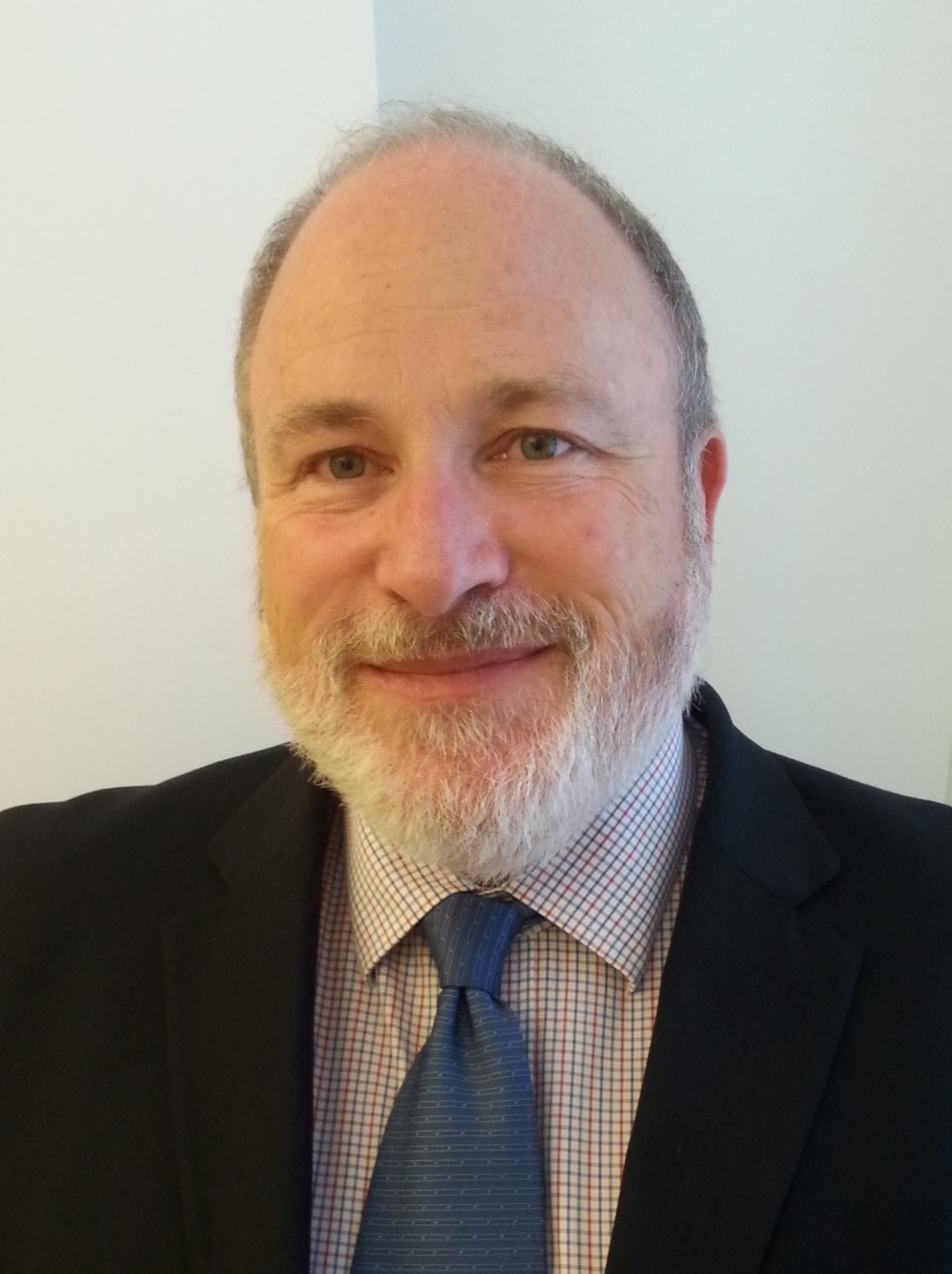

Diplomatic roles
- 2000-2002: Ambassador of Israel to Paraguay
- 2002-2003: Ambassador of Israel to Bolivia
- 2007-2010: Ambassador of Israel to Colombia
- 2010-2011: Permanent Representative to the UN
- 2020-present: Consul General of Israel in Boston

Personal details
- Born: 1961 (age 64–65) Cape Town, Union of South Africa
- Education: Hebrew University of Jerusalem

Meron Reuben (Hebrew: מירון ראובן; born 1961, Cape Town, South Africa) is an Israeli diplomat. In November 2020, Reuben was appointed Consul General to New England.

== Biography ==
Meron Reuben was born in South Africa. He moved to London, United Kingdom with his mother before making aliyah in 1974. He is a graduate of the Hebrew University of Jerusalem where he studied diplomacy and international relations. He is divorced from Paola Testa Yudelevich, with whom he has two daughters.

== Diplomatic career ==
Reuben served as Permanent Representative of Israel to the United Nations (2010–2011), Ambassador to Paraguay, Bolivia and Colombia. From 2015 until 2020, he was Chief of State Protocol. He served as Israel's Consul General in Boston from November 2020 to August 2024 and returned to work in the Israeli Ministry of Foreign Affairs in Jerusalem.
