= Embassy of Israel, Kathmandu =

Nepal is the diplomatic mission of Israel in Nepal

- Address: P8CC+RPW, Kathmandu 44600, Nepal
- Coordinates: 27°43′20″N 85°19′18″E
- Opened: March 1961
- Ambassador: H.E. Shmulik Arie Bass
- Jurisdiction: Nepal
- Website: https://new.embassies.gov.il/nepal/en

The Embassy of Israel to Nepal is the diplomatic mission of Israel in Nepal. The Embassy was established in March 1961 after diplomatic relations were established between the two countries in June 1960, under the leadership of David Ben-Gurion, the first Prime Minister of Israel and B.P. Koirala, the first elected Prime Minister of Nepal.

Israel opened its Embassy in Kathmandu in March 1961. Nepal opened a Consulate General in Israel in November 1993 and then the Embassy of Nepal in Israel on 17 August 2007.

== Ambassadors of Israel to Nepal ==
The following is the list of ambassadors:

- 1961–1963 Eliashiv Ben-Horin (Non-Resident, Naypyidaw) 1960 - 1963
- 1964–1965 Moshe Erell; Meshulum Varon
- 1965–1967 Moshe Erell
- 1967–1970 Mordechai Avgar
- 1970–1975 Avshalorn Caspi
- 1975–1977 Yair Aran
- 1977–1981 Shammy Z. Laor
- 1981–1983 Shaul Kariv
- 1983–1985 Ann Marie Finkler Lambert
- 1985–1987 Baruch Gilad
- 1987–1991 Shmuel E. Moyal
- 1991–1993 Shlomo Dayan
- 1993–1997 Esther Efrat‑Smilg
- 1998-1999 Benny Omer
- 2000–2003 Avraham Nir
- 2003–2005 Dan Ben-Eliezer
- 2005–2010 Dan Stav
- 2011–2014 Hanan Goder-Goldberger
- 2014–2017 Yaron Mayer
- 2017–2020 Benny Omer
- 2020-2024 Hanan Goder Goldberger
- 2024-present Shmulik Arie Bass

== Activities ==
- A few scholarships are awarded each year for Nepalis to study in Israel.
- Nepal and Israel issued joint postage stamps for NPR 35 in Nepal and 5 Shekels in Israel, themed 'The highest point on Earth, Mount Everest (in Nepal), and the lowest point on Earth, the Dead Sea (in Israel)'.
- The Embassy of Israel has been organizing annual Israeli Film Festivals in Kathmandu since 2006, centered on a different theme each year.
- A "Dining in the Dark" restaurant in which diners eat in complete darkness was set up at Imagodei Restaurant, Nagpokhari, Kathmandu in aid of the Nepal Association for Blind, with the initiation of The Embassy of Israel in Kathmandu from 10 to 24 May 2012. This type of restaurant gives diners an impression of the experience of a blind person.
- An Eye Camp operated from 22 April to 2 May 2011 at Mane Kharka, Langtang Valley for the community in the mountainous region, providing free treatment for eye ailments. An Israeli technology mobile operating room was run by the Eye From Zion organization; doctors from the Kathmandu University hospital, Dhulikhel Hospital volunteered for the camp. The doctors had conducted eye examinations, treatments and surgeries at Mane Kharka.
- Israel issued several videos: Israel in Nepal's Channel, Israeli cuisine: ShakshukaChaminHummusFalafelSchnitzel, Medical Clown, Agricultural Demonstration Farm
