= List of ambassadors of Israel to Senegal =

== List of ambassadors ==
- Ben Burgel 2021-
- Roi Rosenblit 2018 - 2021
- Paul Hirschson 2015 - 2018
- Eliahu Ben-Tura 2011 - 2015
- Gideon Behar 2006 - 2011
- Daniel Pinhasi 2004 - 2006
- Shlomo Avital 2003 - 2004
- Shlomo Morgan 2000 - 2002
- Doron Mordechai Grossman 1997 - 2000
- Arie Avidor 1995 - 1997
- Menachem Carmon 1972 - 1973
- Eytan Ruppin 1967 - 1969
- Hanan Aynor 1964 - 1967
- Victor Eliachar 1962 - 1964
