= Natan Peled =

Israeli politician (1913–1992)

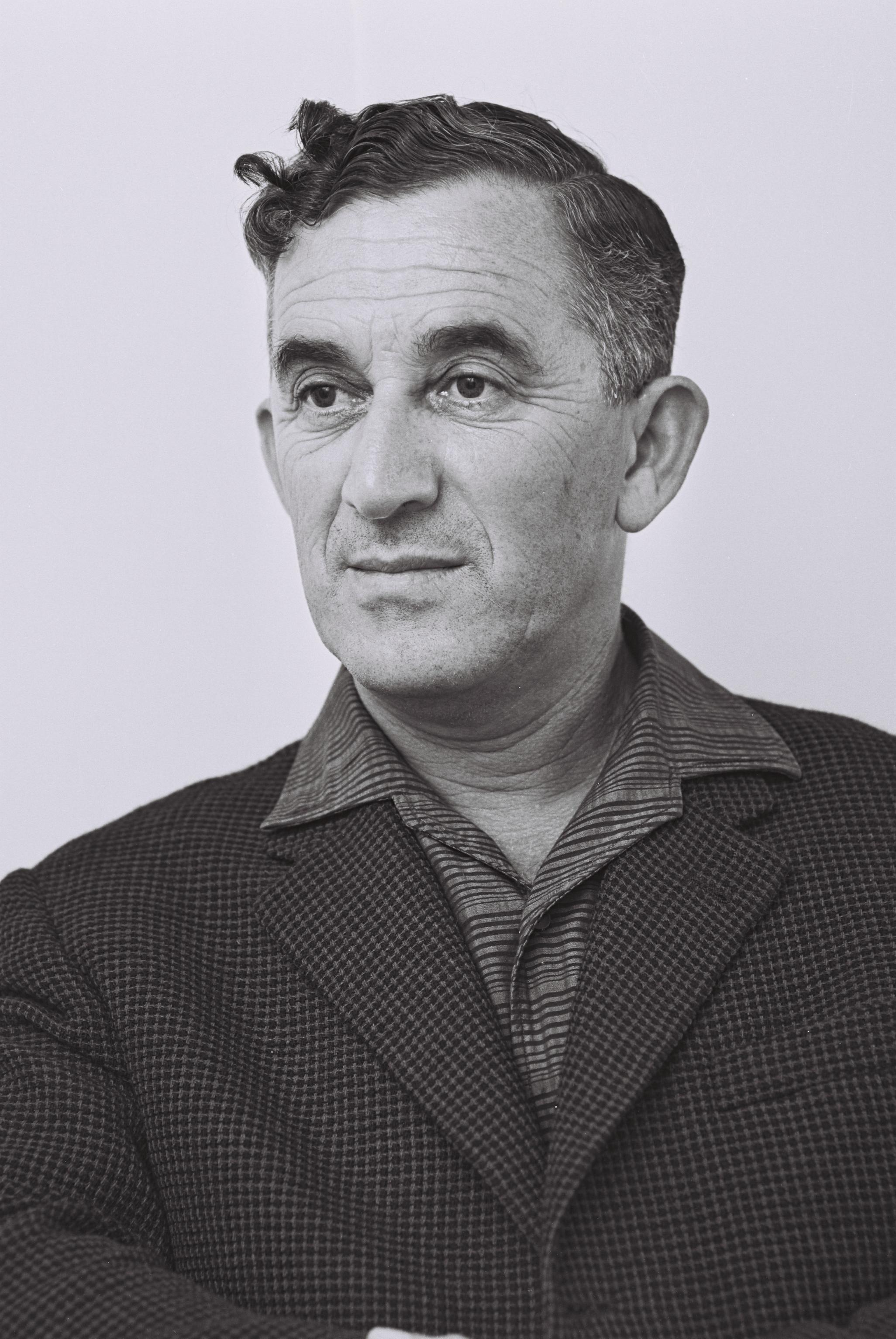

Ministerial roles
- 1970–1974: Minister of Immigrant Absorption

Faction represented in the Knesset
- 1965–1969: Mapam
- 1969: Alignment

Personal details
- Born: 3 June 1913 Odessa, Russian Empire
- Died: 8 January 1992 (aged 78)

Natan Peled (Hebrew: נתן פלד; 3 June 1913 – 8 January 1992) was an Israeli politician who served as Minister of Immigrant Absorption from 1970 until 1974.

== Biography ==
Born in Odessa in the Russian Empire (today in Ukraine), Peled moved with his family to the Bessarabian region of Romania when he was eight, where he studied at a Hebrew school in Chișinău. He joined the local Hashomer Hatzair movement, and was the secretary to the organisation's leadership in Romania. He was also secretary to the central committee of the HeHalutz movement.

He emigrated to Mandatory Palestine in 1933, and joined kvutzat Melet in Nes Tziona, where he was also a member of the local Workers' Council. In 1934 he joined kibbutz Sarid, and in 1936 became a member of the executive committee of Kibbutz Artzi, which was affiliated with Hashomer Hatzair, serving on its secretariat until 1939.

Between 1939 and 1944 he was secretary of the Histadrut's security committee. From 1946 until 1948 he served as an emissary of Hashomer Hatzair and the Histadrut in the United States. After his return to Israel, he served as secretary of Hashomer Hatzair-Kibbutz Artzi from 1950 until 1955.

In 1956 he became the political secretary of Mapam (the party affiliated with Hashomer Hatzair), a role he held until appointed Israel envoy to Bulgaria in 1958. In 1960 he became Israel's ambassador to Austria, serving until 1963.

In 1965 he was elected to the Knesset on Mapam's list. Although he lost his seat in the 1969 elections, he was appointed Minister of Immigrant Absorption in July 1970, a role he held until after the 1973 elections. Between 1975 and 1980 he returned to his role as secretary of Kibbutz Artzi.
