= Yeshayahu Anug =

Israeli diplomat

Yeshayahu Anug (1924-2007) was an Israeli diplomat who played a vital role in establishing the Ministry of Foreign Affairs (Israel).

Anug served as Ambassador to Canada from 1979 until 1984. He was also active “in establishing diplomatic relations with Spain and the restoration of relations with Hungary and the Soviet Union in the 1980s.” At the time of his mission to Moscow, he was Deputy Director General of the Ministry.

From 1963 until 1965, he was Ambassador to Uruguay and Paraguay.
