= List of ambassadors of Israel to Chile =

== List of ambassadors ==
- Marina Rosenberg 2019 - 2022
- Eldad Hayet 2016 - 2019
- Rafael Eldad 2014 - 2016
- David Dadonn 2009 - 2014
- David Cohen (diplomat) 2005 - 2009
- Josef Regev 2000 - 2005
- Ori Noy 1997 - 2000
- Pinchas Avivi 1993 - 1997
- Daniel Mokady 1989 - 1993
- Zvi Tenney 1987 - 1989
- David Efrati 1983 - 1987
- Yitzhak Shefi 1978 - 1979
- Moshe Avidan 1975 - 1978
- Moshe Tov 1971 - 1975
- Dov Sattath 1968 - 1971
- Eliezer Doron 1958 - 1963
- Minister Aryeh Leon Kubovy (Non-Resident, Buenos Aires) 1953 - 1958
- Minister Jacob Tzur (Non-Resident, Buenos Aires) 1949 - 1953
