= Ilan Sztulman =

Israeli diplomat

- אילן שטולמן
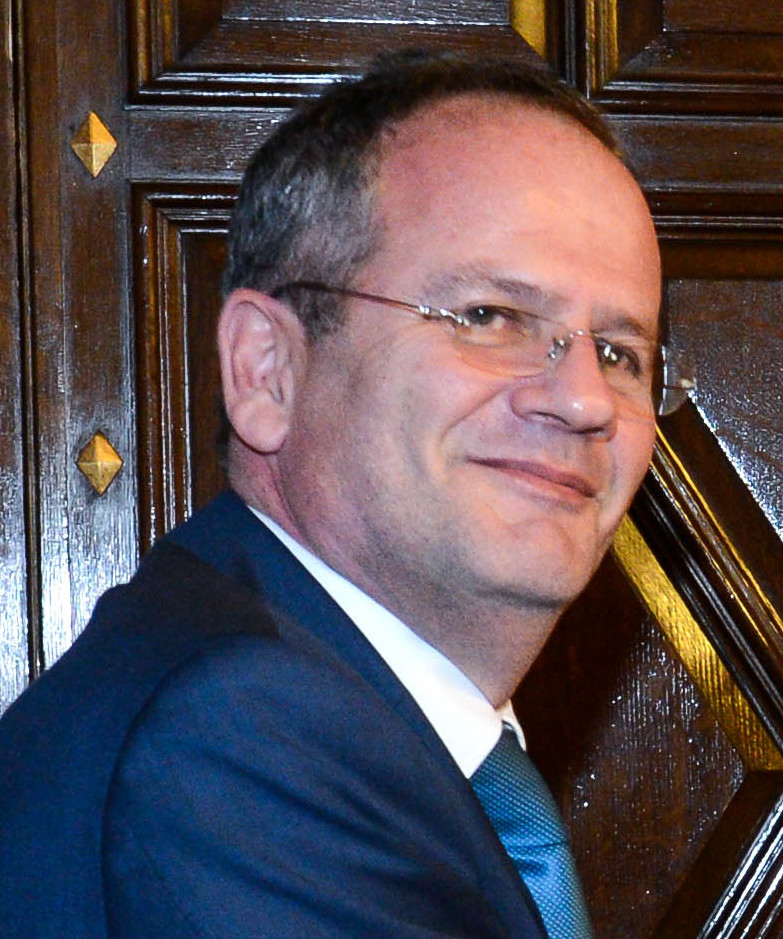

Israel Ambassador to Argentina
- In office 2016–2019
- Preceded by: Dorit Shavit
- Succeeded by: Galit Ronen

Personal details
- Born: São Paulo, Brazil
- Occupation: Diplomat

Ilan Sztulman (Hebrew: אילן שטולמן) was the Israeli Ambassador to Argentina from 2016 until 2019. He replaced Dorit Shavit and was succeeded by Galit Ronen.

He served as Consul General to São Paulo.

Sztulman was born in São Paulo and made Aliyah when he was 18.

In early 2021 he began serving as the first consulate of Israel to the United Arab Emirates in Dubai.
