= Hagai Dikan =

Israeli diplomat

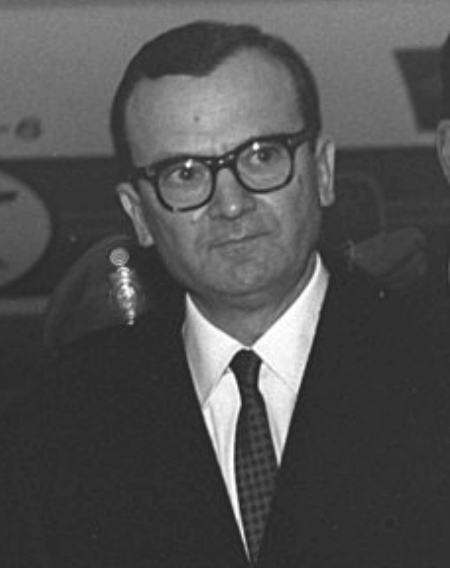
Hagai Dikan

Hagai Dikan (Hebrew: חגי דיקן) was an Israeli diplomat who was Israel’s first ambassador to Singapore.

He has also served as ambassador to Costa Rica, Uruguay, the Ivory Coast, Venezuela, and Burkina Faso.
