= Shani Cooper =

Israeli diplomat

Shani Cooper-Zubida (Hebrew: שני קופר-זובידה) has been the Ambassador of Israel to Ghana, Liberia and Sierra Leone since August 15, 2018. For a short time, she was Chargé d'affaires in Turkey., She replaces Ami Mehl. At the time of her appointment, Cooper was the only woman serving as an ambassador in Africa.

== Biography ==
Before entering the foreign service, Cooper was an editor at Haaretz and an assistant professor for political science at Tel Aviv University and at the Open University.

Cooper earned a B.A. degree in political science and Journalism and an M.A. degree in Political Science (Magna Sum Laude), both from Tel Aviv University.
