= Shimon Avimor =

Israeli diplomat

- שמעון אבימור

Israeli Ambassador to Cambodia
- In office 1976–1979

Israeli Ambassador to Laos
- In office 1972–1975

Personal details
- Born: Erich S. Schwarz
- Citizenship: Israel
- Occupation: Israeli diplomat and author

Shimon Avimor (Hebrew: שמעון אבימור) born Erich S. Schwarz, was an Israeli diplomat and author. Avimor was the Israeli Ambassador to Cambodia, Laos (non-resident, Phnom Penh 1972 – 1975), Gabon.

On 28 December 1972, Avimor was one of four Israeli officials who were taken hostage at the Israeli Embassy in Bangkok. He was also the Consul General to Monaco and Head of the Mission (1976–1979).

== Publications ==
- Relations Between Israel and Asian and African States: Côte d'Ivoire Written with Hanan Aynor Hebrew University of Jerusalem, Harry S. Truman Research Institute for the Advancement of Peace, Leonard Davis Institute for International Relations, 1986
- Contemporary History of Cambodia (1949–1975) Under an Israeli Perspective (French Text), 1982
