= Giora Becher =

Israeli diplomat

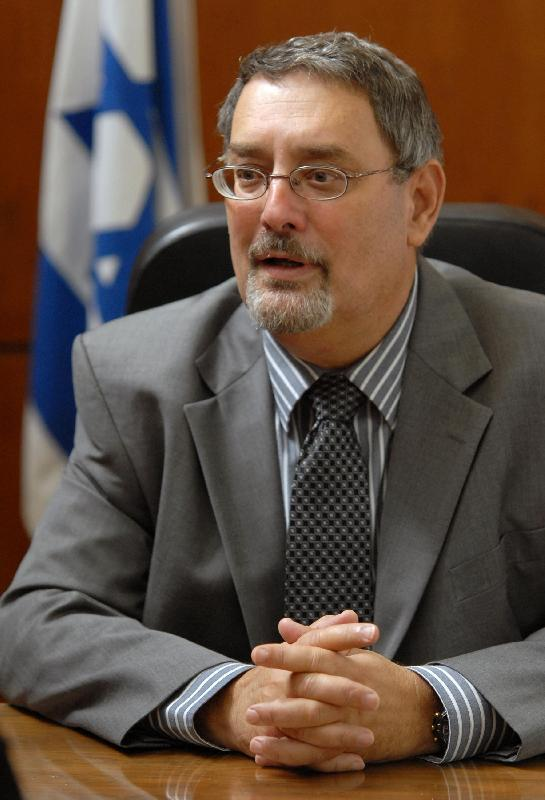
Giora Bachar

Giora Becher (Hebrew: גיורא בכר) was Israel's Ambassador to Brazil from 2008 until 2011, Colombia from 2014 until 2015 and beginning in September 2000, Consul General to Philadelphia. He also served as Consul of Israel in Bombay and Israel's first Charge D’affairs in New Delhi, India.,

== Biography ==
Born on February 7, 1950, in Kibbutz Misgav-Am, Becher lived most of his life in Netanya. He earned a bachelor's degree from Tel Aviv University (psychology and political science), a master's degree in political science from the University of Haifa and the Israeli National Defense College.
