= Eliashiv Ben-Horin =

Israeli diplomat (1921–1990)

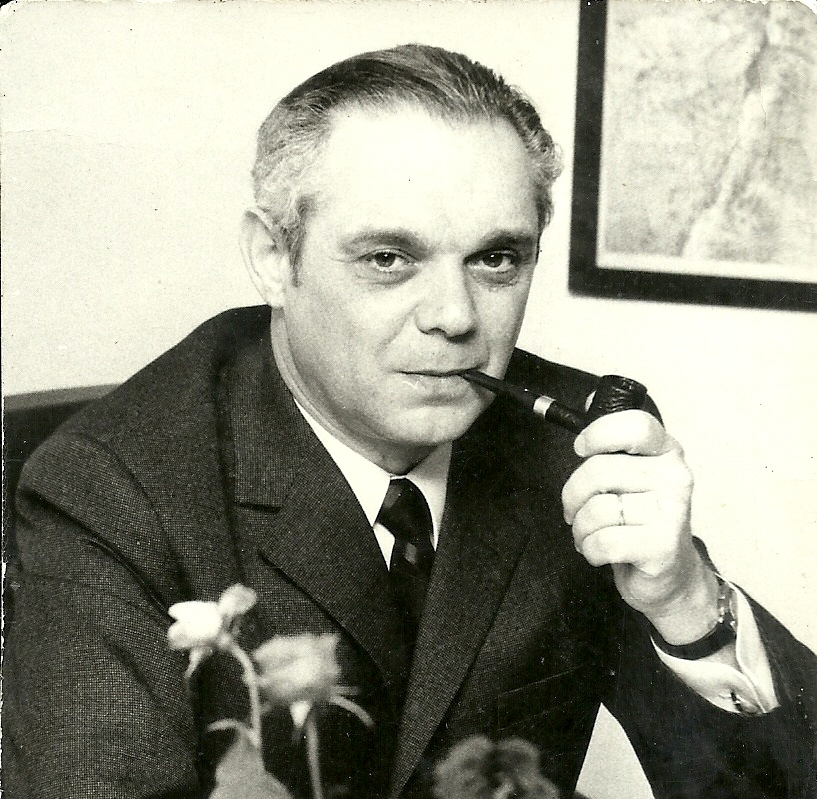

Israeli Ambassador to Burma
- In office 1960–1963
- Appointed by: Golda Meir

Israeli Ambassador to Venezuela, Jamaica, and Trinidad and Tobago
- In office 1963–1967
- Appointed by: Golda Meir

Israeli Ambassador to West Germany
- In office 1970–1974
- Appointed by: Abba Eban

Personal details
- Born: 4 September 1921 Upper Silesia, Poland
- Died: 2 June 1990 (aged 68)

Eliashiv Ben-Horin (1921 – 2 June 1990) was an Israeli Diplomat who served as Ambassador to Burma, Nepal and Sri Lanka (non-resident, Naypyidaw 1960–1963), and Venezuela with a concurrent appointment in Trinidad and Tobago and Jamaica (1963–1967), West Germany (1970–1974), Belgium, Luxembourg and the European Economic Community (1974–1978).

== Biography ==
Ben-Horin was born in Sosnowiec, Poland in 1921. His father taught him Hebrew. He and his family emigrated to Palestine in 1935. After studying law in London and Jerusalem as well as serving in both the Israeli and British armies, Ben-Horin entered the Foreign Service in 1950.

== Munich Olympics ==
Ben-Horin was the Israeli Ambassador to West Germany during the hostage crisis at the 1972 Munich Olympics. As a result, “he was the first official Israeli representative to meet with the negotiating team ... (keeping) the diplomatic channels open for both formal and informal messages.”
