= List of ambassadors of Israel to Trinidad and Tobago =

- Reda Mansour (Non-Resident, Panama City), 2018–2021
- Mordehai Amihai-Bivas (Non-Resident), 2015–2018
- Chanan Olami (Non-Resident, Caracas), 1987–1991
- Mordechai Palzur (Non-Resident, Santo Domingo), 1982–1986
- Moshe Liba (Non-Resident, Caracas), 1978
- Victor Eliachar (Non-Resident, Caracas), 1974–1977
- Jacob Doron (Non-Resident, Caracas), 1967–1971
- Eliashiv Ben-Horin (Non-Resident, Caracas), 1963–1967
- Arie Oron (Non-Resident, Caracas), 1961–1963
