= List of ambassadors of Israel to Burkina Faso =

== List of ambassadors ==
- Rony Yedidia-clein 2016-2024
- Isi Yanouka 2013-2016
- Yaacov Deckel 1969 - 1973
- Yaeir Algom 1964 - 1969
- Hagai Dikan (Non-Resident, Abidjan) 1963 - 1964
- Shlomo Hillel (Non-Resident, Abidjan) 1961 - 1963
