= Sharon Bar-Li =

Israeli diplomat

Sharon Bar-li (Hebrew: שרון בר-לי) is the Deputy Director of the Africa Division of the Ministry of Foreign Affairs (Israel) and was the Israeli ambassador to Ghana and Liberia from 2011 until 2015. While serving in Ghana, she was responsible for opening the Israeli embassy for the first time in 38 years., She was later appointed deputy ambassador to London.

Bar-Li earned a BA in Middle Eastern Studies and Political Science from Tel Aviv University.

In February 2023, Bar-Li was ejected from an African Union summit in Addis Ababa while serving as Israel's envoy to the event.
