= Guy Feldman =

Israeli ambassador

Guy Feldman (Hebrew: גיא פלדמן) was the Israeli ambassador to Nigeria and The Economic Community of West African States (ECOWAS) from 2016 until 2018 and was Ambassador to Eritrea from 2010 until 2013.

In 2017, Feldman cancelled an embassy sponsored Israeli Independence Day celebration, deciding to use the funds to start a soccer league for children living in refugee camps displaced from their homes because of Boko Haram.

Feldman was an Israeli Air Force pilot for 22 years before joining the foreign service. He retired as a lieutenant colonel in 2002 and was in the active reserve until 2015. Feldman earned a Bachelor’s degree in Middle Eastern Studies from the University of Haifa and an MBA from Manchester University.
