= List of ambassadors of Israel to the Central African Republic =

== List of ambassadors ==
- Amnon Kalmar (Yaoundé, credentials presented on 2025-03-17)
- Ran Gidor (Non-Resident, Yaounde) 2016 -
- Yoram Elron 2000 - 2003
- Yitzhak Michaeli 1970 - 1973
- Aharon Ofri 1965 - 1968
- Efraim Ben-Haim 1961 - 1963
