= Isi Yanouka =

Israeli diplomat (died 2023)

Yitzhak "Isi" Yanouka (Hebrew: יצחק (איזי) ינוקא; died 8 April 2023) was the Israeli Ambassador to Cameroon.

Yanouka served as Ambassador to the Ivory Coast, concurrent in Togo, Benin, and Burkina Faso, from 2013 until 2016. In 2010, the Angolan government refused to receive openly gay Yanouka as the new ambassador due to his sexuality.

Yanouka married his husband, Rabbi Mikie Goldstein, in the 1990s, making the latter man the first same-sex spouse of an Israeli envoy.

On 10 April 2023, it was announced that Yanouka had died.
