= List of ambassadors of Israel to Eritrea =

The following is a list of Israeli ambassadors to Eritrea:

- Ishmael Khaldi, 2020–
- Gadi Harpaz, 2016–2020
- Elie Antebi, 2013–2016
- Guy Feldman, 2010–2013
- Menahem Kanafi, 2005–2008
- Hanan Goder-Goldberger, 2002–2005
- Uri Savir, 2001–2005
- Nathan Meron, 2000–2002
- Raphael Walden, 1997–1999
- Ariel Cerem, 1993–1996
