= List of ambassadors of Israel to Ivory Coast =

The Ambassador from Israel to the Ivory Coast is Israel's foremost diplomatic representative in the Ivory Coast.

== List of ambassadors ==
- Rony Yedidia Clein 2022 -
- Leo Vinovezky 2019 - 2022
- Eli Ben-Tura 2016 - 2019
- Isi Yanouka 2013 - 2016
- Benny Omer 2009 - 2013
- Daniel Kedem 2006 - 2008
- Michael Arbel 2004 - 2006
- Daniel Kedem 2001 - 2004
- Benny Omer 2001
- Yoel Barnea 1998 - 2000
- Yaacov-Jack Revach 1993 - 1997
- Gadi Golan 1990 - 1993
- Menachem Carmon 1987 - 1990
- Arye Gabai 1973 - 1976
- Nissim Yosha 1971 - 1973
- Joel Alon 1969 - 1970
- Hagai Dikan 1963 - 1964
- Shlomo Hillel 1961 - 1963
