= List of ambassadors of Israel to the Bahamas =

== List of ambassadors ==
- Jonathan Peled (Non-Resident, Mexico City) 2015 - 2019
- Rodica Radian-Gordon (Non-Resident, Mexico City) 2010 - 2015
- Ephraim Evron (Non-Resident, Washington, D.C.) 1978 - 1982
- Simcha Dinitz (Non-Resident, Washington, D.C.) 1973 - 1978
