= List of ambassadors of Israel to the Gambia =

Ambassadors of Israel to The Gambia have included:

== List of ambassadors ==
- Ben Burgel 2021
- Roi Rosenblit (Non-Resident, Dakar) 2018 - 2021
- Paul Hirschson (Non-Resident, Dakar) 2015 - 2018
- Eytan Ruppin (Non-Resident, Dakar) 1967 - 1969
- Hanan Aynor 1964 - 1967
