= Nina Ben Ami =

Israeli diplomat

- נינה בן עמי
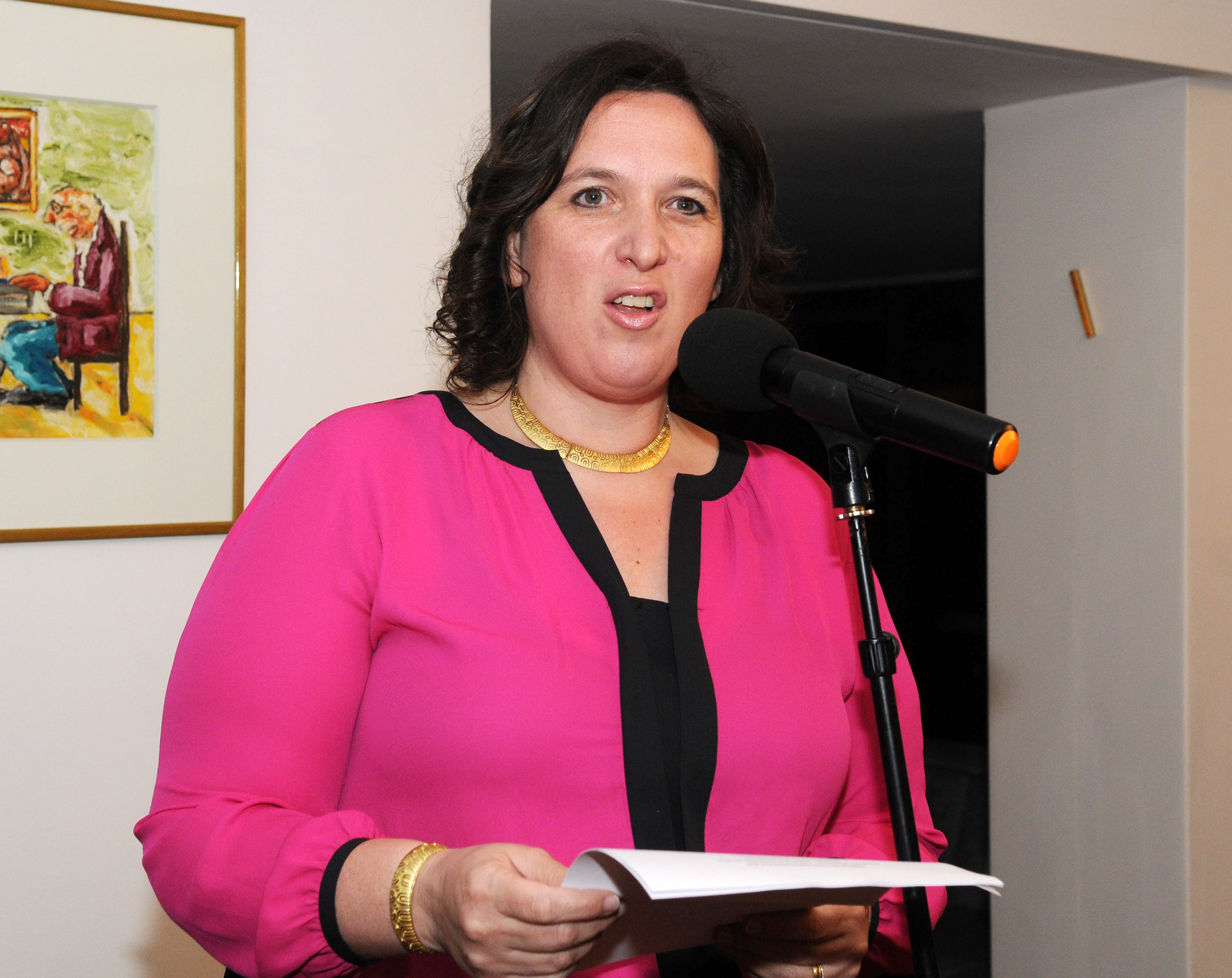

Israeli Ambassador to Uruguay
- In office 2014–2018
- Appointed by: Avigdor Lieberman

Personal details
- Born: Rockville, Maryland, United States
- Education: Princeton University
- Awards: Fulbright Scholar

Nina Ben Ami (Hebrew: נינה בן עמי) is an Israeli diplomat currently serving as the Deputy Director General for UN and International Organizations at Israel's Ministry of Foreign Affairs. Ben-Ami previously served as the Israeli Ambassador to Uruguay from 2014 until 2018, Advisor to Israel's Minister of Foreign Affairs, Spokesperson in Paris, Consul in Montreal, and Second Secretary in Abidjan, Côte d'Ivoire.

Originally from Rockville, Maryland, Ben Ami graduated from Rockville High School, the Woodrow Wilson School of Public and International Affairs at Princeton University, and the University of Haifa. Ben Ami was also a Fulbright Scholar in Israel.
