= List of ambassadors of Israel to Belize =

== List of ambassadors ==
- Jonathan Peled (Non-Resident, Mexico City) 2015–2019
- Oren Bar-El (Non-Resident, San Salvador) 2015–2018
- Shmulik Arie Bass (Non-Resident, San Salvador) 2011–2014
- Mattanya Cohen (Non-Resident, San Salvador) 2007–2011
- Tsuriel Raphael (Non-Resident, San Salvador) 2006–2007
- Jonathan Peled (Non-Resident, San Salvador) 2004–2006
- Yosef Livne (Non-Resident, San Salvador) 2001–2004
- Aryeh Zur (Non-Resident, San Salvador) 1998–2001
- Yosef Livne (Non-Resident, San Salvador) 1993–1997
- David Cohen (diplomat) (Non-Resident, San Salvador) 1990–1993
- Baruch Gilad (Non-Resident, San Salvador) 1988–1990
- Zak Deckel (Non-Resident, San Salvador) 1974–1978
