= List of ambassadors of Israel to Antigua and Barbuda =

== List of ambassadors ==
- Mordechai Palzur (Non-Resident, Santo Domingo) 1982 - 1986
- Daniel Biran Bayor (Non-Resident, Santo Domingo) 2018–present

Ambassadors Bayor and Palzur also served concurrently to St. Kitts and Nevis.
