= Jonathan Peled =

Israeli diplomat

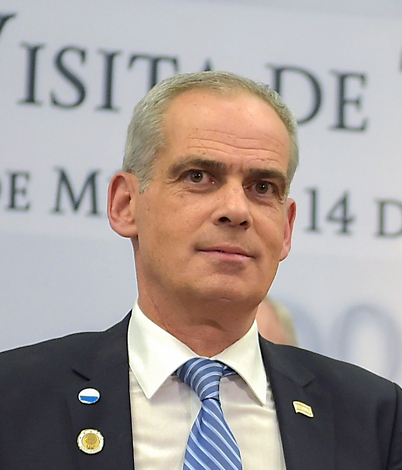
Jonathan Peled

Jonathan Peled (Hebrew: יונתן פלד) is an Israeli diplomat who is currently the Ambassador of Israel to Italy and San Marino. He served as the Ambassador of Israel to Mexico from July 2015 to 2019 (concurrent with Belize and the Bahamas). As a diplomat, he has also served as the Ambassador of Israel to El Salvador (2004 - 2006), as Spokesman of the Ministry of Foreign Affairs of Israel and as Spokesman for the Israeli Embassy in Washington D.C.

== Early life ==
Peled was born in Jerusalem and grew up at Kibbutz Neot Mordechai. He studied Political Science and Economics at Tel Aviv University.

Peled has one sibling and three children.

== Mexico ==
Shortly after Donald Trump’s 2017 inauguration, it was reported that Peled would be called in for a meeting with Mexican Foreign Minister Luis Videgaray Caso where he was “expected to receive an angry telling-off after Netanyahu tweeted that Trump’s border wall was a ‘great idea,’ comparing it to the wall on Israel's southern border.”
