= List of ambassadors of Israel to Barbados =

== List of ambassadors ==
- Reda Mansour (Non-Resident, Panama City) 2018 -
- Mordehai Amihai-Bivas (Non-Resident) 2015 - 2018
- Mordechai Palzur (Non-Resident, Santo Domingo) 1982 - 1986
- Moshe Melamed (Non-Resident, Kingston) 1979 - 1981
- Gideon Saguy (Non-Resident, Kingston) 1975 - 1979
- Jacob Doron (Non-Resident, Caracas) 1967 - 1971
