= Ehud Gol =

Israeli diplomat

Ehud Gol (Hebrew: אהוד גול; born 1946, in Jerusalem) is an Israeli diplomat.

== Education ==
From 1969 until 1971, Gol studied at Hebrew University of Jerusalem in 1969–1971, earning a BA in International Relations and Political Science. In 1973–1975, he studied American Studies at New York University.

== Diplomatic career ==
He served as ambassador to Italy (while concurrently serving to FAO, WFP & IFAD), Malta, San Marino, Spain, Andorra, Albania, Portugal, Tajikistan, Turkmenistan, and as the Consul General to Rio de Janeiro.
