= List of ambassadors of Israel to Vietnam =

== List of ambassadors ==
- Nadav Eshcar 2017 -
- Meirav Eilon Shahar 2012 - 2017
- Amnon Efrat 2009 - 2012
- Ephraim Ben-Matityahu 2005 - 2009
- Avraham Nir 2003 - 2005
- Amikam Levy 2001 - 2003
- Walid Mansour 1999 - 2001
- Uri Halfon 1995 - 1998
- David Matnai 1993 - 1995
