= List of ambassadors of Israel to Bulgaria =

== List of ambassadors ==
- Yosef Levi-Sfari 2023 -
- Yoram Elron 2019 - 2023
- Irit Lillian 2015 - 2019
- Shaul Raz Kasima 2012 - 2015
- Noah Gal Gendler 2006 - 2011
- Avi Sharon (diplomat) 2002 - 2006
- Emanuel Zisman 2000 - 2002
- David Cohen (diplomat) 1996 - 2000
- Avi Sharon 1993 - 1996
- Meir Joffe 1990 - 1993
- Victor Eliachar 1967
- Minister Zvi Avnon 1961 - 1967
- Natan Peled Envoy to Bulgaria, 1958-1960
