= List of ambassadors of Israel to Paraguay =

The Ambassador from Israel to Paraguay is Israel's foremost diplomatic representative in Paraguay.

== List of ambassadors ==
- Amit Mekel 2024 –
- Yoed Magen 2019 – 2024
- Zeev Harel 2017 – 2018
- Peleg Lewi 2015 – 2017
- Meron Reuben 2000 – 2002
- Yoav Bar-On 1995 – 1998
- Shmuel Meirom 1990 – 1994
- Yaacov Brakha 1986 – 1990
- Berl Zerubavel 1981 – 1984
- Netanel Matalon (Non-Resident, Motevideo) 1979 – 1981
- Avraham Sarlouis 1976 – 1978
- Shlomo Catz 1972 – 1975
- Binyamin Varon 1969 – 1972
- Moshe Alon (Non-Resident, Montevideo) 1965 – 1969
- Yeshayahu Anug (Non-Resident, Montevideo) 1963 – 1965
- Itzhak Harkavi (Non-Resident, Montevideo) 1960 – 1963
- Minister Aryeh Leon Kubovy (Non-Resident, Buenos Aires) 1954 – 1958
- Minister Jacob Tsur (Non-Resident, Buenos Aires) 1949 – 1953
