= List of ambassadors of Israel to Jamaica =

== List of ambassadors ==
- Daniel Biran Bayor (Non-Resident, Santo Domingo) 2018 -
- Yehoshua Hacohen 1985 - 1988
- Shlomo Levy 1981 - 1985
- Moshe Melamed 1979 - 1981
- Gideon Saguy 1975 - 1979
- Johanan Bein (Non-Resident, Santo Domingo) 1972 - 1974
- Avraham Sarlouis (Non-Resident, Santo Domingo) 1967 - 1969
- Eliashiv Ben-Horin (Non-Resident, Caracas) 1963 - 1967
