= Dorit Shavit =

Israeli Ambassador to Argentina

- דורית שביט
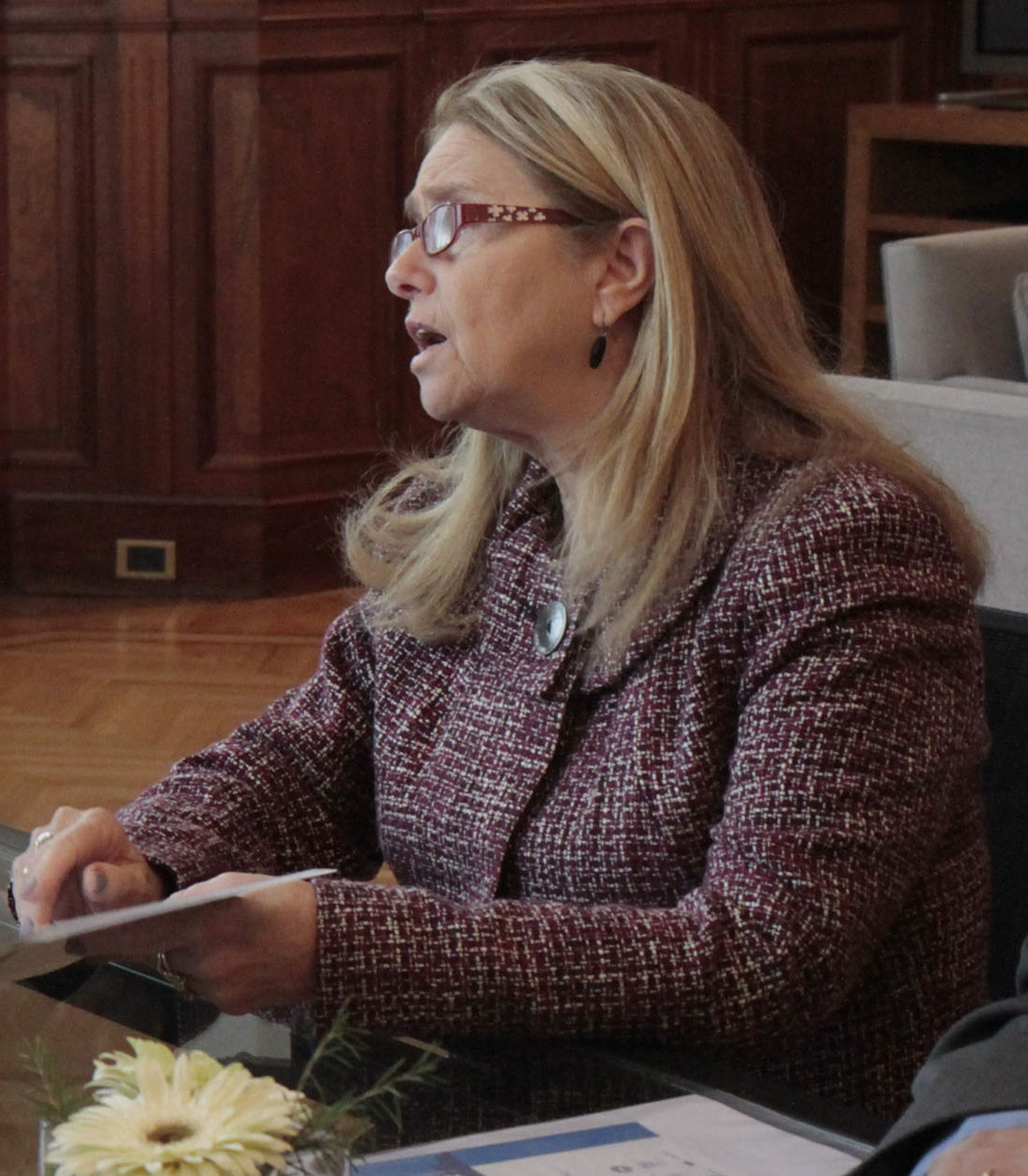

Israel Ambassador to Argentina
- In office 2011–2016
- Preceded by: Daniel Gazit
- Succeeded by: Ilan Sztulman

Personal details
- Born: July 13, 1949 (age 77) Jerusalem
- Education: Hebrew University
- Occupation: Diplomat

Dorit Shavit (Hebrew: דורית שביט; born March 13, 1949 Jerusalem) was the first woman to be Israeli Ambassador to Argentina, from 2011 until 2016.

From 1994 to 1999, she was Consul General in São Paulo.

She never intended to work for the Foreign Ministry, having studied Islamic Studies at Hebrew University. However, after the Yom Kippur War, and recommendations made by the Agranat Commission, "she was recruited for her knowledge of Arabic culture."

Shavit’s parents emigrated to Mandatory Palestine from Germany. Her mother arrived in 1922 with her family. Her father arrived in 1936 to work on a kibbutz.
