= List of ambassadors of Israel to Colombia =

== List of ambassadors ==
- Gali Dagan 2023-2024
- Marco Sermoneta 2015–2019
- Giora Becher 2014–2015
- Yoed Magen 2011–2014
- Meron Reuben 2007–2011
- Yair Recanati 2003–2007
- Ehud Eitam 2001–2003
- Raphael Schutz 1999–2001
- Avraham Haddad 1996–1999
- Yaacov Deckel 1993–1996
- Pinchas Avivi 1991–1993
- Gideon Tadmor 1988–1991
- Yaakov Gotal 1984–1988
- Jaim Aron 1981–1984
- Eliahu Barak 1978–1981
- Shlomo Havilio 1974–1978
- Victor Eliachar 1968–1974
- Avigdor Shoham 1965–1968
- Yaacov Yinon 1963–1965
- Walter Abeles 1960–1963
- Tuvia Arazi (Non-Resident, Lima) 1956–1960
