= Galit Ronen =

Israeli diplomat

Her Excellency Galit Ronen
- גלית רונן
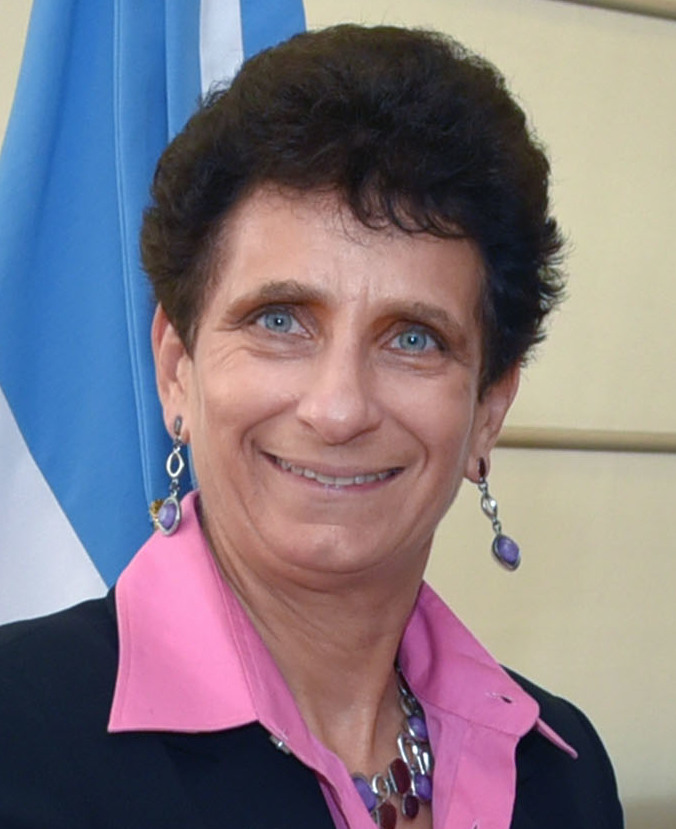
- Ronen in 2019

Ambassador of Israel to Argentina
- Assumed role 9 September 2019 – 10 December 2022
- Prime Minister: Benjamin Netanyahu
- Preceded by: Ilan Sztulman

Personal details
- Born: 2 January 1965 (age 61) Ramat HaShofet, Israel
- Education: Tel Aviv University
- Occupation: Biologist, diplomat

Galit Ronen (Hebrew: גלית רונן; born January 2, 1965) is an Israeli diplomat who was Israel's ambassador to Uruguay from 2018 to 2019, and currently serves as ambassador to Argentina.

== Biography ==
Ronen was born on January 2, 1965, in Ramat HaShofet, a kibbutz in northern Israel. She attained a bachelor of science degree in biology from Tel Aviv University in 1990, and a master's degree in microbiology from the same university in 1992. On 1 August 2018 she was confirmed as the State of Israel's ambassador to the Oriental Republic of Uruguay. On 9 September 2019, she presented her credentials before the President of Argentina, confirming her post as the new Israeli ambassador to that nation.
