= List of ambassadors of Israel to Panama =

This is a list of Israel's ambassadors to Panama. The current ambassador is Itai Bardov, who has held the position since 2021.

== List of ambassadors ==
- Itai Bardov 2021 -
- Reda Mansour 2018 - 2021
- Gil Artzyeli 2016 - 2018
- Alexander Galilee 2011 - 2015
- Yoed Magen 2009 - 2011
- Menashe Bar-On 2005 - 2009
- Emanuel Seri 2001 - 2002
- Yair Recanati 1997 - 2001
- Yaacov Brakha 1993 - 1997
- Shaul Kariv 1984 - 1988
- Chanan Olami 1979 - 1982
- Menachem Karmi 1976 - 1979
- Mordechay Arbel 1972 - 1976
- Yehiel Eilsar 1968 - 1972
- Levy Arye Alon1964 - 1968
- Joshua Nissim Shai (Non-Resident, Guatemala City) 1959 - 1964
