= Jacob Tsur =

Israeli diplomat

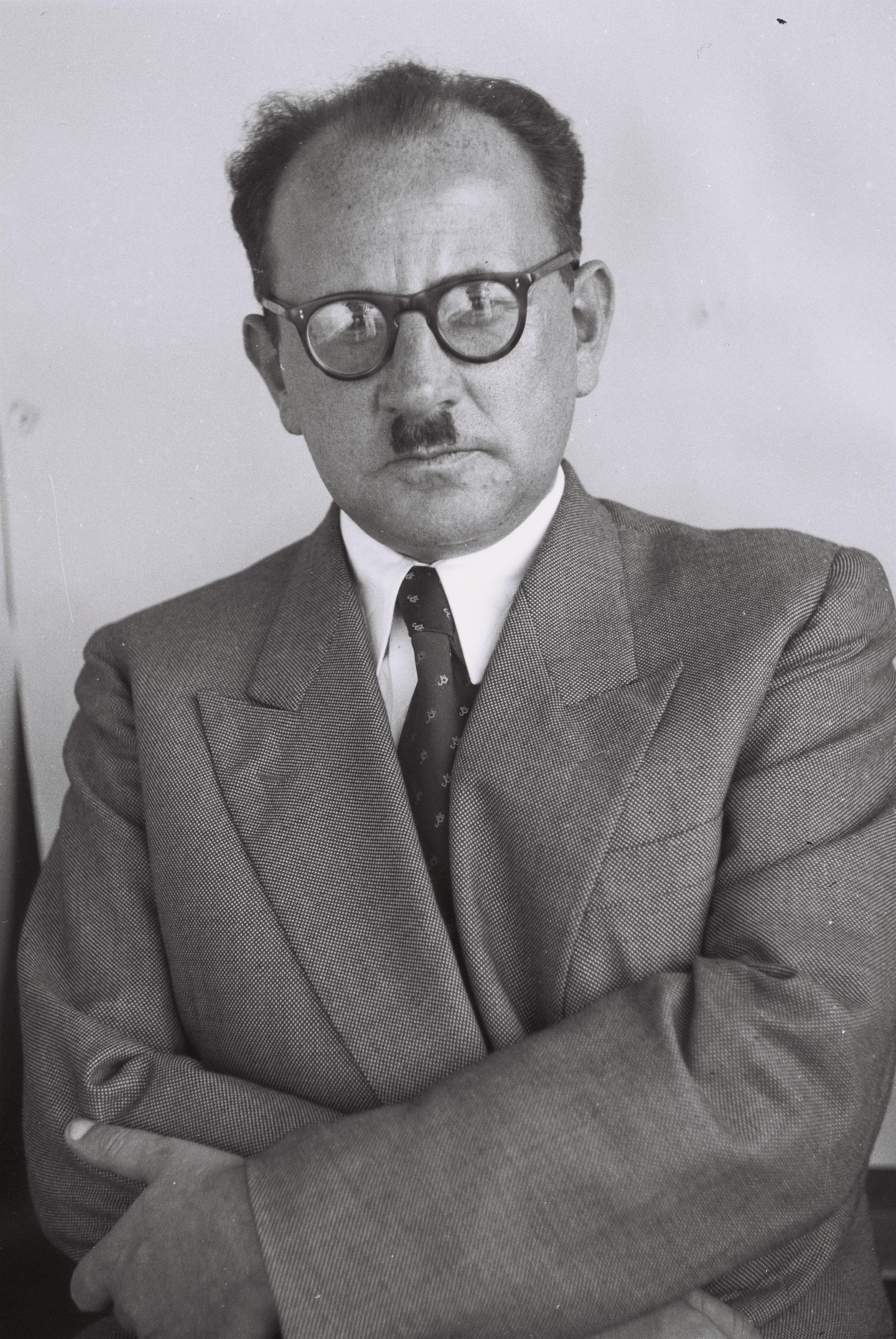
Yaakov Tsur

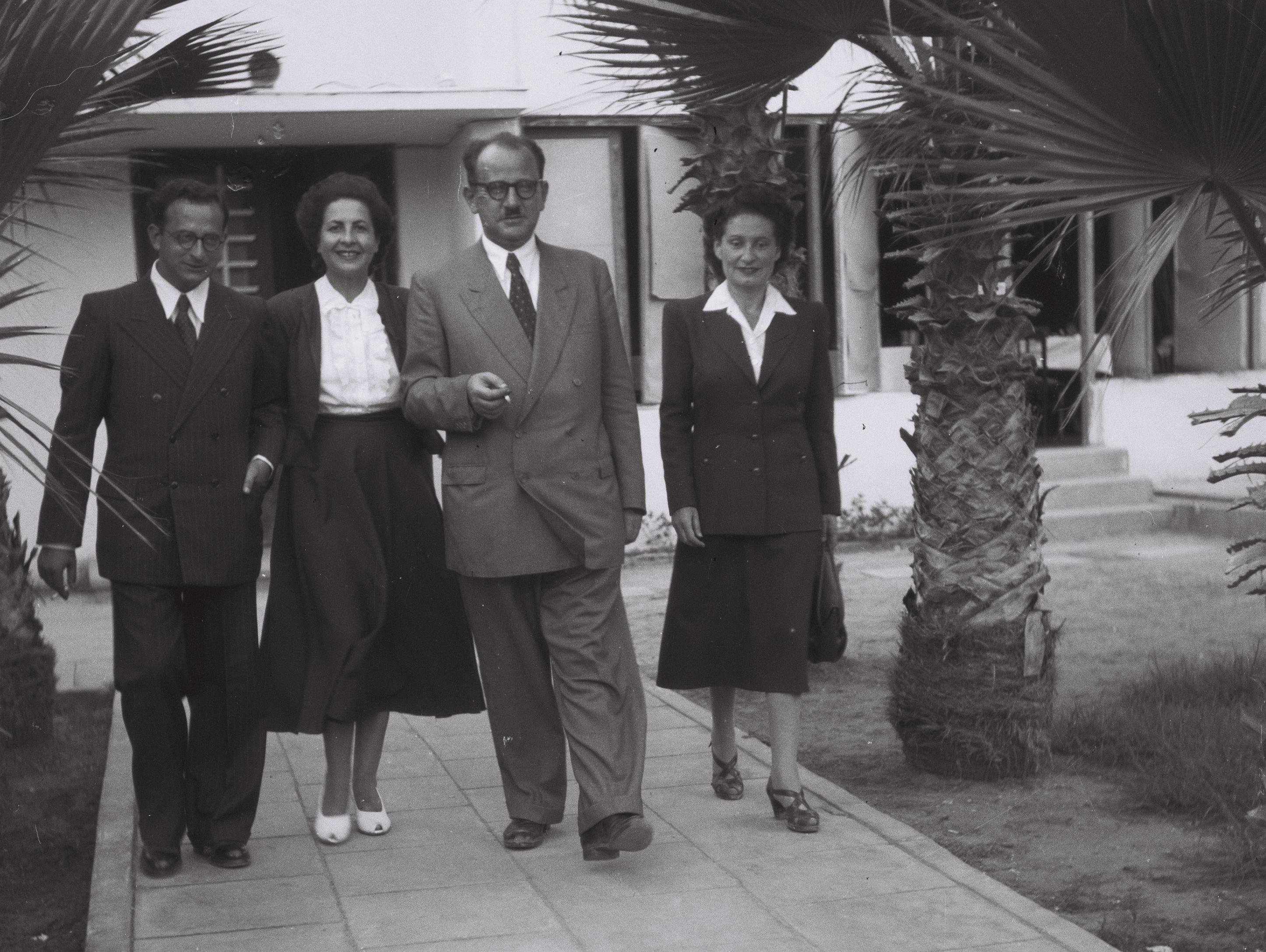
Israel-Uruguay delegation1948

Jacob Tsur (Hebrew: יעקב צור; 1906-1991) was an Israeli diplomat. He was the first Israeli ambassador to Argentina, Uruguay, Paraguay, and Chile (1949-1953). He also served as ambassador to France from 1953 until 1956. From 1961 until 1977, he was Chairman of the Board of Directors for Kerel Kayemeth LeIsrael Jewish National Fund (KKL-JNF).

== Biography ==
Jacob Tsur was born in Vilna, son of Samuel Tchernowitz. He made aliyah to pre-state Israel in 1921.His son, Muki Tzur, a historian and veteran member of Kibbutz Ein Gev, moved back to Israel in 1956 while his father was stationed abroad.
