= List of ambassadors of Israel to Liberia =

Satyapal Kasana Kotputli

== List of ambassadors ==
- Roey Gilad 2023-present
- Shlomit Sufa 2021- 2023
- Shani Cooper 2019 - 2021
- Emanuel Mehl 2015 - 2018
- Sharon Bar-Li (Non-Resident, Accra) 2011 - 2015
- Pinhas Rodan 1969 - 1973
- Nahom Astar 1965 - 1969
- Ehud Avriel (Non-Resident, Accra) 1957 - 1960
- Gavriel Gavrieli 1983 - 1985
- Yeroham Cohen 1960 - 1962
