= List of ambassadors of Israel to Spain =

Ambassadors in Spain are also accredited to Andorra.

== List of ambassadors ==
- Rodica Radian-Gordon September 2019 - May 2024
- Daniel Kutner 2015 - 2019
- Alon Bar (diplomat) 2011 - 2015
- Raphael Schutz 2007 - 2011
- Victor Harel 2003 - 2007
- Herzl Inbar 1999 - 2003
- Ehud Gol 1995 - 1999
- Shlomo Ben-Ami 1987 - 2001
- Shmuel Hadas 1986 - 1987
