= Rafael Eldad =

Israeli diplomat

Rafael Eldad (Hebrew: רפאל אלדד; born 24 September 1949) is an Israeli diplomat. He was appointed Israel's ambassador to Chile after concluding in August 2014 his term as ambassador of Israel to Brazil. He was Israel's ambassador to Argentina from August 2004 until October 2008.

== Biography ==
Rafael Eldad was born in Morocco. He immigrated to Israel in 1962. From 1973 to 1977 he studied at the University of Haifa, where he received a doctorate in political science and history. In addition to Hebrew, he speaks English, French, Spanish and Portuguese.

Rafael is married to Batia Eldad Levy, and they have three daughters: Keren, Liron and Dana and two grandchildren Itay and Noa.

== Diplomatic career ==
Eldad joined the Israeli diplomatic corps in 1978. In 1980 he was a member of the Israeli delegation to the United Nations General Assembly. From 1981 to 1983 he was second secretary at Israel's embassy in Turkey. In 1983 he was appointed first secretary at the embassy in Costa Rica, in which position he remained until 1986. From 1986 to 1989 he was the director of the Public Affairs Division in Israel.

From 1989 to 1992 he was minister councilor at the Israeli embassy in Argentina and, from 1994 to 1995, minister councilor for the Eastern European Division. In 1995 he returned to the Public Affairs Division in Israel as its director, remaining there until 1998.

From 1998 to 2002 he was Israel's ambassador to Peru, in 2002 he was appointed director of the South American Department of the foreign ministry. In 2004 he was chosen to serve as ambassador to Argentina, and following, in 2011, as ambassador to Brazil. In 2014-2016 he served as ambassador to Chile. In September 2016 he retired and lives in Tel Aviv.

== See also ==
- List of Israeli ambassadors to Argentina
