= Ehud Avriel =

Israeli politician

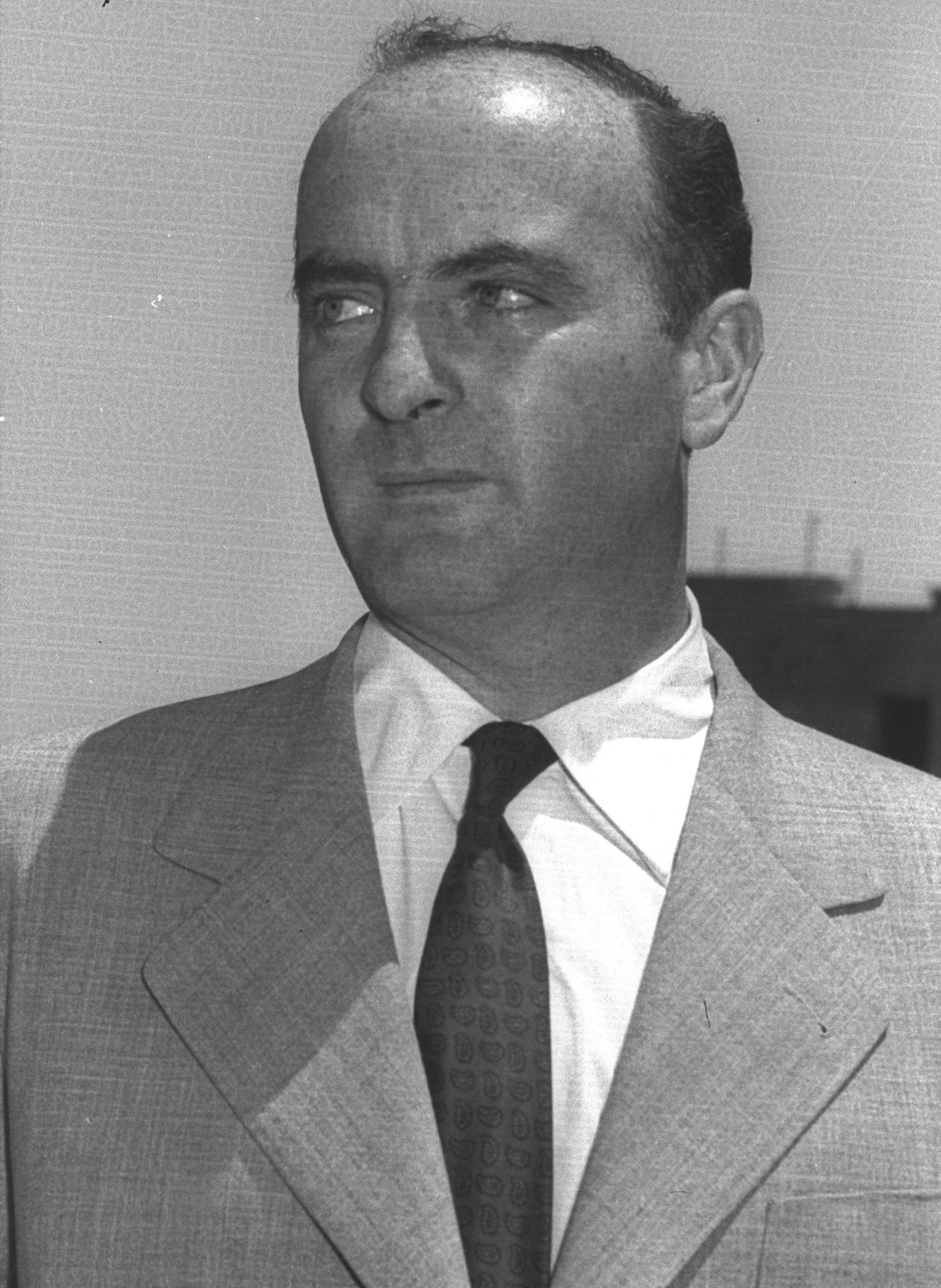

Faction represented in the Knesset
- 1955–1957: Mapai

Diplomatic roles
- 1957–1960: Ambassador to Ghana
- 1957–1960: Ambassador to Liberia
- 1960: Ambassador to Congo-Léopoldville
- 1965–1968: Ambassador to Italy
- 1966–1968: Ambassador to Malta

Personal details
- Born: 19 October 1917 Vienna, Austria-Hungary
- Died: 27 August 1980 (aged 62) Jerusalem

1951 Diplomatic passport used by Avriel in Romania

Ehud Avriel (Hebrew: אהוד אבריאל; 19 October 1917 – 27 August 1980) was an Israeli diplomat and politician who served as a member of the Knesset for Mapai between 1955 and 1957.

== Biography ==
Born Georg Überall in Vienna in Austria-Hungary, Avriel was educated at the Humanistic Secondary School. He was a member of the Blue-White movement, and between 1938 and 1940 worked for the Youth Aliyah office in occupied Vienna.

He immigrated to Mandatory Palestine in 1940 and settled in kibbutz Neot Mordechai. He joined the Haganah, and was involved in the Rescue Committee assisting Jews flee Europe. He spent some years in Turkey as well for that purpose. After the war ended he helped illegal Jewish immigration to Palestine. In 1946 he was sent to Czechoslovakia to purchase arms for the Jewish community. On 28 July 1948 he became envoy to Czechoslovakia and Hungary. Together with Israeli tycoon Efraim Ilin, Avriel negotiated an arms deal with Czechoslovakia. Two years later he was moved to Romania where he remained, as head of the legation, until late March 1951, returning to Israel in April.

In 1955 he was elected to the Knesset on the Mapai list. However, he resigned on 31 July 1957, and was appointed ambassador to Ghana and Liberia, a position he held until 1960. He then briefly served as ambassador to the newly-independent Congo-Léopoldville. Between 1961 and 1965 he served as deputy director general of the Ministry of Foreign Affairs, before serving as ambassador to Italy between 1965 and 1968. From 1966 until 1968, while based in Rome, he was also ambassador to Malta. He later worked as a consul general in Chicago in 1974, and an ambassador for Special Affairs between 1977 and 1979.

He died of a heart attack on 27 August 1980 while giving a lecture on the diaspora of American Jews in Jerusalem, and was buried in the cemetery of Neot Mordechai.
