= List of ambassadors of Israel to Haiti =

This is a list of Israel's ambassadors to Haiti. The current ambassador is Daniel Biran Bayor, who has held his position since 2018.

== List of ambassadors ==
- Daniel Biran Bayor (Non-Resident, Santo Domingo) 2018 -
- Yaacov Deckel 1982 - 1986
- Zvi Loker 1975 - 1980
- Zeev Bashan 1973 - 1975
- Mordekhai Shneeron (Non-Resident, Mexico City) 1960 - 1963
