= List of ambassadors of Israel to Sri Lanka =

== List of ambassadors ==
- Naor Gilon 2021-
- Ron Malka (Non-Resident, New Delhi) 2018 - 2021
- Daniel Carmon (Non-Resident, New Delhi) 2014 - 2018
- Mark Sofer (Non-Resident, New Delhi) 2007 - 2011
- Brosh Zvi 1966 - 1968
- Minister Eliashiv Ben-Horin (Non-Resident, Naypyidaw) 1960 - 1963
- Minister Daniel Lewin (diplomat) (Non-Resident, Naypyidaw) 1957 - 1960
