= Pinhas Lavie =

Israeli diplomat (1935–2020)

- פנחס לביא
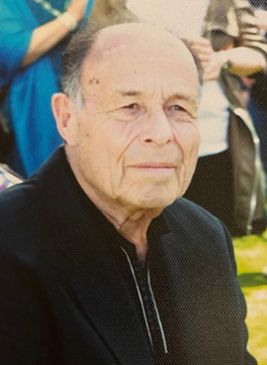
- Born: Pinhas Lubart; September 4, 1935; Danzig, Germany
- Died: July 31, 2020 (aged 84); Israel
- Occupations: Diplomat; Israeli ambassador to Swaziland and the Dominican Republic
- Spouse: Rachel Lavie
- Parent(s): Shmuel Lubart; Yehudit Mor

Pinhas Lavie (Hebrew: פנחס לביא; September 4, 1935 – July 31, 2020) was an Israeli diplomat who served as ambassador to Swaziland (since 2018 renamed to Eswatini) and the Dominican Republic.

== Biography ==
His father, Shmuel Lubart, was born in Astrakhan, Russia. Shmuel's parents immigrated to Mandatory Palestine in 1933 and settled in Pardes Hanna, where they were farmers and citrus growers. As a result of his work in the leather and fur trades, Shmuel attended a fair in Leipzig, where he met his future wife, Yehudit Mor (a native of the city), whose father had a business selling fur and leather. They married in 1925 in Leipzig, where their first son, Aryeh, was born a year later. Pinhas Lubart (later Lavie) was born in 1935 in Danzig. In 1938, the family immigrated to Palestine. They settled in Pardes Hanna and worked in farming and citrus-growing. He attended high school at Kfar Galim youth village and studied international relations at the Open University.

From 1964 to 1968, he served under Pinhas Gonen as deputy head of a Defense Ministry delegation to Malawi that trained the local army following the country's independence from the United Kingdom. While serving overseas, he Hebraicized his last name from Lubart to Lavie, in keeping with the requirement instituted by David Ben-Gurion. In 1970, Lavie was sent to Thailand, where he served as administrative officer and press attaché at the Israeli Embassy in Bangkok until 1974. In 1972, he was one of six Foreign Ministry personnel held hostage at the Israeli Embassy in Bangkok by Palestinians from the Black September Organization.

From 1974 to 1979, Lavie worked in the Financial Division of Israel's Foreign Ministry as an administrative assistant, head of the Overseas Section, and director of the Wages Department. From 1979 to 1984, he served in Paris as an advisor and regional administrative officer to Spain, Portugal, and France. In 1984, and 1990–1993, he served as director of the Dispatch and Absorption Department, and in 1984–1986, was secretary of the Treatment Fund, Administrative Division. From 1986 to 1990, he served in New York as regional advisor and administrative officer for Atlanta, Boston, Miami, and Philadelphia.

From 1993 to 1995, Lavie served as ambassador in Mbabane, Swaziland (since 2018 renamed to Eswatini), and as non-resident ambassador in Maseru, Lesotho.

In 1995 to 2000, Lavie served as ambassador in Santo Domingo, the Dominican Republic, and as ambassador to several Caribbean Community member states: Antigua and Barbuda, Barbados, Grenada, Jamaica, Dominica, Haiti, Saint Vincent and the Grenadines, Saint Lucia, and Saint Kitts and Nevis. He retired from the Foreign Ministry in 2000.

From 1955 until his death, Pinhas Lavie was married to Rachel, with whom he had four children. Over the years, she worked at the embassies where he served, and at the Foreign Ministry.

== See also ==
- List of kidnappings
