= List of ambassadors of Israel to Venezuela =

== List of ambassadors ==
- Shlomo Cohen 2003 - 2009
- Arie Tenne 1999 - 2003
- Yosef Hasseen 1995 - 1999
- Herzl Inbar 1991 - 1995
- Chanan Olami 1987 - 1991
- Moshe Liba 1978 - 1981
- Hagai Dikan 1977 - 1978
- Victor Eliachar 1974 - 1977
- Yosef Shofman 1971 - 1974
- Jacob Doron 1967 - 1971
- Eliashiv Ben-Horin 1963 - 1967
- Arie Oron 1960 - 1963
- Moshe Avidan 1958 - 1960
- Ambassador Arie Aroch 1957 - 1958
- Minister David Shaltiel (Non-Resident, Brasilia) 1952 - 1956
