= List of ambassadors of Israel to Ghana =

== List of ambassadors ==
- Shlomit Sufa
- Shani Cooper 2018 -
- Emanuel Mehl 2015 - 2018
- Sharon Bar-Li 2011 - 2015
- Yaacov-Jack Revach 1986 - 1987
- Yoav Bar-On 1984 - 1986
- Mordehay Avgar 1973
- Avraham Cohen 1967 - 1973
- Mordechai Shalev 1965 - 1967
- Michael Arnon 1962 - 1965
- Moshe Bitan 1960 - 1962
- Ehud Avriel 1957 - 1960
