= List of ambassadors of Israel to Argentina =

The ambassador from Israel to Argentina is Israel's foremost diplomatic representative in Argentina.

== Ambassadors of Israel to Argentina ==
- Jacob Tsur 1949–1953
- Arieh Leon Kubhovy 1953–1958
- Arieh Levavi 1958–1960
- Yosef Avidar 1961–1965
- Moshe Alon 1965–1969
- Eliezer Doron 1969–1974
- Ram Nirgad 1974–1979
- Dov Schmorak 1980–1985
- Ephraim Tari 1985–1989
- Itzhak Shefi 1989–1993
- Itzhak Aviran 1993–2000
- Benjamin Oron 2000–2004
- Rafael Eldad 2004–2009
- Daniel Gazit 2009–2011
- Dorit Shavit 2011–2016
- Ilan Sztulman 2016–2019
- Galit Ronen 2019–2022
- Eyal Sela 2022–present
