= List of ambassadors of Israel to the Democratic Republic of the Congo =

== List of ambassadors ==
- Shimon Solomon (Non-resident, Luanda) | 2022 - ...
- Oren Rozenblat (Non-resident, Luanda)
- Eli Ben-Tura (Non-resident)
- Yoram Elron (Non-resident) | 2012-2015
- Jacques Revah (Non-résident) | 2007 - 2011
- Daniel Saada (Non-resident, Jerusalem) | 2005 - 2007
- Nicole Gad | 2000 - 2003
- Shlomo Avital | 1990 - 1997
- Acher Hakeny | 1986 - 1990
- Michael Michael (diplomat) | 1982 - 1984
- Haim Yaary | 1967 - 1970
- Ehud Avriel | 1960

== List of Honorary Consuls ==
- Aslan Piha | 2012 - 2023
