= List of ambassadors of Israel to Cameroon =

== List of ambassadors ==
- Isi Yanouka 2023
- Ran Gidor 2016–2023
- Nadav Cohen 2013–2016
- Michael Arbel 2009–2013
- Avraham Nir 2007–2009
- Benny Omer 2003–2007
- Yoram Elron 2000–2003
- Tova Levy-Furman 1998–2000
- Yaacov Keinan 1988–1992
- Gadi Golan 1986–1988
- Haim Yaary 1971–1973
- Shlomo Havilio 1964–1969
- Elhanan Gafni 1962–1964
