= List of ambassadors of Israel to Portugal =

The Ambassador from Israel to Portugal is Israel's foremost diplomatic representative in Portugal.

== List of ambassadors ==
- Oren Rosenblat 2024 - present
- Dor Shapira 2021 - 2024
- Raphael Gamzou 2017 - 2021
- Tzipora Rimon 2013 - 2017
- Ehud Gol 2009 - 2013
- Aaron Ram 2004 - 2009
- Shmuel Tevet 2001 - 2004
- Yehiel Yativ 1997 - 2001
- Benjamin Oron 1992 - 1997
- Kolet Avital 1988 - 1992
- Joel Baromi 1984 - 1985
- Dov Halevy-Milman 1981 - 1983
- Efraim Eldar 1977 - 1981
- Avraham Gilboa 1964 - 1967
- Ambassador Levy Arye Alon 1962 - 1964
- Consul General Shimon Amir 1960 - 1962
