= List of ambassadors of Israel to Nigeria =

== List of ambassadors ==
- Guy Feldman 2016 - 2018
- Uriel Palti 2013 - 2016
- Moshe Ram 2007 - 2013
- Noam Katz 2002 - 2007
- Arie Avidor 2000 - 2002
- Itzhak Oren 1998 - 1999
- Gadi Golan 1994 - 1998
- Moshe Gilboa 1992 - 1994
- Yissakhar Ben-Yaakov 1969 - 1973
- Ram Nirgad 1966 - 1969
- Chanan Yavor 1960 - 1963
- Shlomo Argov 1960
