= List of ambassadors of Israel to Gabon =

== List of ambassadors ==
- Nadav Cohen (Non-Resident, Yaounde) 2013 - 2016
- Daniel Saada (Non-Resident, Jerusalem) 2009 - 2011
- Yoram Elron 2000 - 2003
- Zvi Tenney Sept 1973 - Oct 1973 (interrupted due to the Yom Kippur War )
- Meir Shamir (diplomat) 1971 - 1973
- David Efrati 1968 - 1971
- Shimon Avimor 1965 - 1968
- Yerachmiel Ram Yaron (Non-Resident, Brazzaville) 1960 - 1964
