= Hanan Aynor =

Israeli diplomat

- חנן עינור
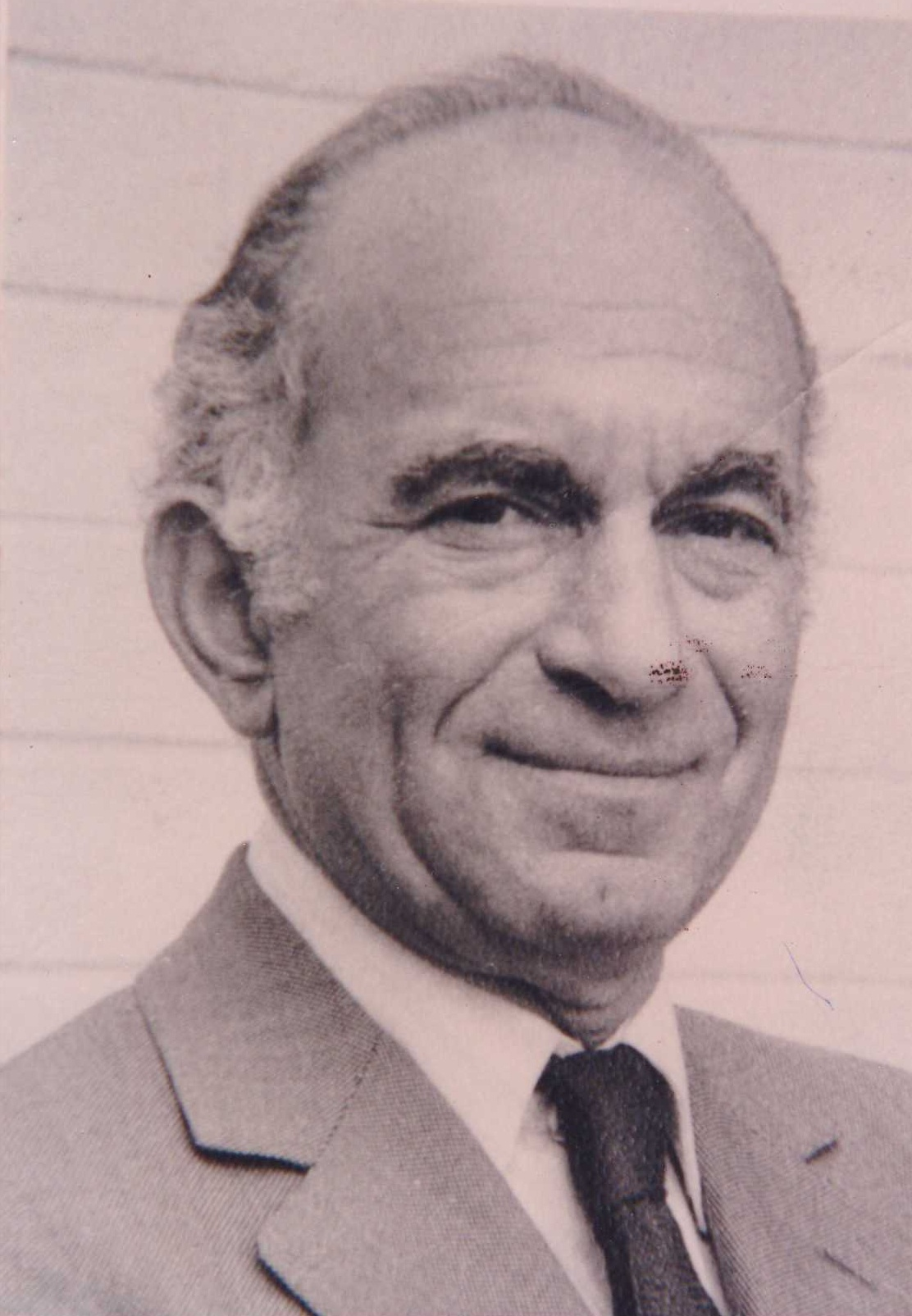

Profession
- Diplomat

Personal details
- Born: 20 October 1916 Frankfurt, Germany
- Died: 15 December 1993 (aged 77)

Hanan Aynor (Hebrew: חנן עינור; October 20, 1916 – December 15, 1993) was an Israeli diplomat, who in 1960s-1980s served as Israel's ambassador to Senegal, Ethiopia, Mexico and Zaire.

== Early life and education ==
Hanan Aynor was born Hans Sonneborn in 1916 to Hermann Sonneborn and Antonia Samuel Sonneborn in Frankfurt, Germany. Aynor fled Nazi Germany in 1932 and after a few years in France joined and was among the founders of Kibbutz Ashdot Ya'akov in pre-state Israel.

Since Hanan fled Nazi Germany in the middle of high school at age 16, he was unable to complete formal studies, nor attend university. He was proud to be self-educated. Hanan married Yaffa Puterman and had a child Ayala Procaccia and then later married Sarah Aynor (Skorohod). Sarah and Hanan met while she was working in a displaced persons camp in France after the Second World War. They had two children, Amos Aynor and Yael Aynor.

== Career ==
During World War II, Aynor served in the British Army behind enemy lines in occupied France. Following the war, Aynor joined the Aliyah Bet operations in Europe, aiding Holocaust survivors to reach Palestine. His roles were diverse, including serving as the official translator for the ship Exodus during the months that it was detained in the port of Marseille. Following the establishment of the State of Israel, Aynor joined the Ministry of Foreign Affairs. Over the next four decades he served his country in Brazil, Canada, the United Nations, and twice, as head of the Ministry’s African desk. He also served as ambassador to Mexico, Senegal, Gambia, Ethiopia and Zaire.

In 1958, Golda Meir, then Minister of Foreign Affairs, appointed Hanan Aynor as the Head of her newly established section for technical cooperation in her Ministry. Aynor was responsible for its structure and activities. In 1960, the section became an independent department called the Department for International Assistance and Cooperation, whose name was later changed to the Center for International Assistance and Cooperation - MASHAV. Under Aynor's leadership, Mashav's scope and work grew and developed into a multimillion shekel enterprise with far reaching ramifications. In 2008, MASHAV marked fifty years of activity as a division of the Israeli Ministry of Foreign Affairs. Since its establishment in 1958, under the initial guidance of Hanan Aynor, it has provided professional guidance for 230,000 course participants from 140 developing countries in Africa, Asia and Latin America, where it has sent thousands of experts to launch projects.

Israel's success in initiating contacts with Africa was not only due to the initiative of Israeli leadership. It resulted in part by the support for Jews and Israel expressed by African thinkers at the beginning of the twentieth century, as well as by Heads of African countries that led their people to independence and believed they could profit from Israel's experience. Aynor was the last Israeli ambassador to Ethiopia before Haile Selassie broke relations with Israel under Arab pressure triggered at the time of the 1973 Yom Kippur War.

Aynor headed the Israel-Africa Friendship League until his death. During the many years of his work in and on behalf of Africa, Aynor formed a strong attachment to Ethiopia and dreamed of bringing its Jews to Israel. He died on December 15, 1993, in Jerusalem, Israel.

== Foreign service postings ==
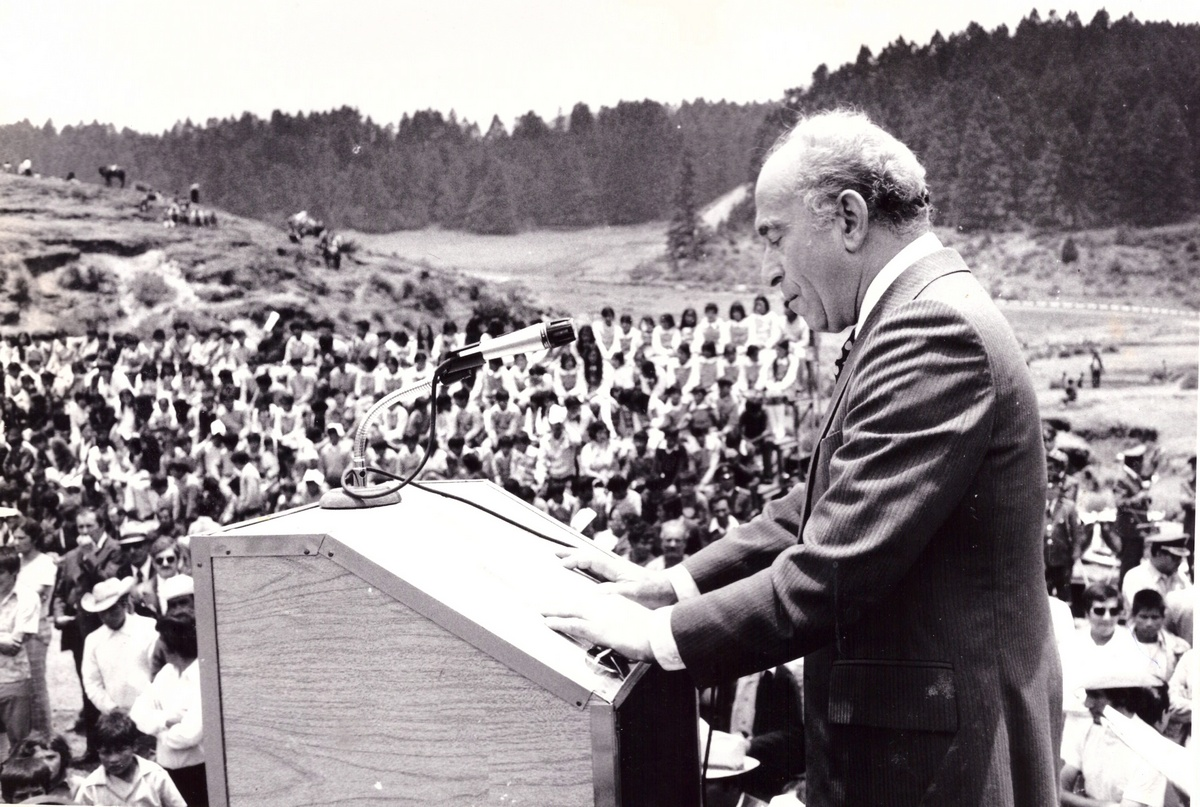
Hanan Aynor, Mexico

Hanan Aynor served a myriad of notable postings both within Israel and on behalf of the Israeli foreign service including:

- 1950: Consular section assistant
- 1950–1951: Assistant in the Western European Wing
- 1951–1954: Vice consul in Montreal, Canada
- 1954: Consular head in Montreal, Canada
- 1955–1958: First secretary in Rio de Janeiro, Brazil
- 1958–1959: First assistant in the Communications and Public Relations Division – Department of Education/Public Relations
- 1959–1960: Section director for international cooperation and assistance in the Communications and Public Relations Division – Department of Education/Public Relations (Mashav)
- 1960: Director of the Department of Communications and Public Relations – Department of Education/Public Relations
- 1960–1961: Israeli delegate to the Democratic Republic of Congo
- 1961–1964: Delegate in Israeli delegation to the UN, New York - (United States)
- 1964–1967: Ambassador to Dakar, Senegal. Ambassador to Gambia
- 1969–1971: African Department director
- 1971–1973: Ambassador to Addis Ababa, Ethiopia
- 1974–1977: Ambassador to Mexico City, Mexico
- 1977–1980: Africa Department director
- 1981–1982: Ambassador to Zaire

== Publications ==
- Notes from Africa - Hanan S. Aynor - Publisher, Praeger, 1969. Original from, the University of Michigan. Digitized, Sep 8, 2006. Length, 163 pages.
- Relations between Israel and Asian and African states - Hanan S. Aynor, Shimon Avimor - Hebrew University of Jerusalem, Harry S. Truman Research Institute for the Advancement of Peace, Leonard Davis Institute for ...
- Africa In Crisis – Patrice Lumumba's Congo, Mobutu Sese Seko's Zaire. Hanan Aynor

== See also ==
- List of ambassadors of Israel to the Gambia
