= Yosef Govrin =

Israeli diplomat (1930–2021)

- יוסף גברין
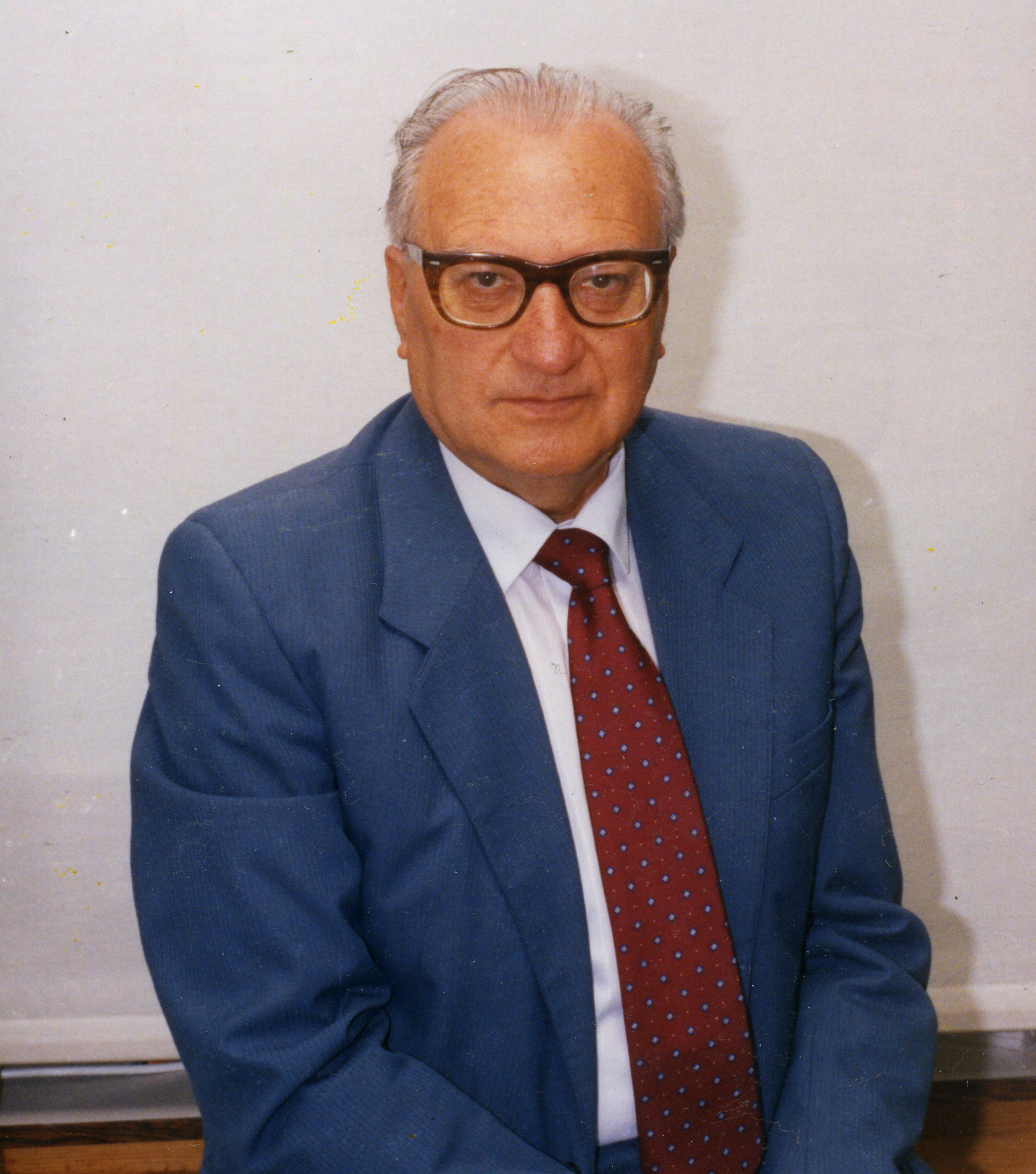

Personal details
- Born: 18 December 1930 Cernăuți, Kingdom of Romania
- Died: 4 June 2021 (aged 90) Jerusalem, Israel
- Occupation: Diplomat

Yosef Govrin (Hebrew: יוסף גברין; 18 December 1930 – 4 June 2021) was an Israeli diplomat who served in Israel's Foreign Service between 1953 and 1995.

== Biography ==
=== Early life ===
Born, 18 Dec. 1930, Czernowitz, North Bucovina (then Romania, now Ukraine) to his late parents Zadcanit (Fradia, nee Lerner) and David Gurvitz. Childhood in Edinitz, Bessarabia (then Romania, now Moldova). Both regions were annexed to the Soviet Union, June 1940. Shortly after the German-Romanian invasion of these areas, in July 1941, tens of thousands of Jews were brutally murdered. The survivors were brutally deported, August–October 1941, by the Romanian Fascist authorities to the ghettoes and death camps of Transnistria, (an area between the rivers Dniester and Bug, governed by Romania 1941-1944). On the roads of deportation, his father David was murdered by the Romanian soldiers. He and his mother survived the liberation in the Mogilev ghetto, Transnistria, by the Red Army, March 1944. In 1946, they crossed the Soviet border to Romania, from there to Yugoslavia, embarking on an illegal cargo ship of Jewish refugees (Aliah Bet), survivors of the Holocaust, on the Adriatic coast, heading for Eretz Israel. Detained by the British Navy, near Haifa, Dec. 1946, and taken to the Refugees camps in Cyprus, under British Administration. Released in Atlit, December 1947, on the eve of Israel's war of Independence.

=== Public and High School Education ===
Jewish-Romanian Public school until 1940, Jewish-Russian school 1940-1941. Uncompleted Russian High school 1944-1946. External Matriculation Exams, Herzliya Gymnasium, Tel Aviv, Israel, 1951.

=== Academic studies ===
B.A., M.A., PH.D., Hebrew University of Jerusalem. In Jewish History and International Relations. Doctoral thesis: Israel-Soviet Relations 1953 - 1967.

=== Military service ===
Liaison Officer in Israel's Military Reserves Forces, to the UN Forces, in Sinai and the Golan Heights

=== Personal life ===
Married to Dr. Hanna (nee Kwietny) Govrin, Bio-Chemist

Daughter, Liora Govrin, LL.M. (+ 1) Senior Lawyer at the Administrator General Office of Israel's Ministry of Justice, Jerusalem

Son, David Govrin, Ph.D., (m. + 3) Senior Diplomat in Israel's Foreign Service.

Languages: Hebrew, Yiddish, English, Spanish, Russian, Romanian, and German.

== Career ==
=== Israel's Ministry of Foreign Affairs (MFA) 1953-1995 ===
His Diplomatic service took place between 1955 and 1970. He served in Sydney (1956 - 1959), Moscow (as a First Secretary, 1964-1967), Buenos Aires (as a Counselor, & Charge d'Affaires 1967-1970). From 1970 to 1976, served as a Deputy Director of the Ministry's Latin American Department and Director of the Central Institute of Cultural Relations between Israel and Latin America, Spain and Portugal; From 1976 to 1985 Director of the Ministry's East European Department, after which he was appointed Ambassador to Romania (1985-1989), Deputy Director-General of the Ministry (1989-1993) and Ambassador to Austria, Ambassador to Austria and non-resident Ambassador to Slovenia and Slovakia (with seat in Vienna) and ambassador to the UNO in Vienna (1993-1995).

==== After Retirement ====
Since his retirement from the MFA (1996) he has been Research Fellow at the Abba Eban Center for Israeli Diplomacy, Harry Truman Institute for the Advancement of Peace, Hebrew University of Jerusalem. Govrin was also a board member for Israel Council on Foreign Relations and active author for the Israel Journal of Foreign Affairs.

== Publications of Govrin ==
=== Books ===
(1) The Jewish Factor in the Relations between Nazi-Germany and the Soviet Union (1933-1941) (Hebrew), Magnes Press, Hebrew University of Jerusalem, 1986; English, Vallentine-Mitchell Publishers, London & Portland, OR, 2009.

(2) Israeli-Soviet Relations 1953-1967: From Confrontation to Disruption (Hebrew), Magnes Press of the Hebrew University, Jerusalem, 1990; Russian, Progress Press, Moscow, 1994; English, Frank Cass, 1998; Awarded Prime Minister's Prize 1991.

(3) In the Shadow of Destruction: Recollections of Transnistria and the Illegal Immigration to Eretz-Israel (Hebrew) Beit Lohamei Haghetaot, 1999; Yiddish, Peretz Press, Tel Aviv, 2002; English, Vallentine Mitchell, London & Portland 2007. Romanian, Sub Spectrul Distrugerii, Hasefer, Bucharest, 2007; German, Im Schatten der Vernichtung, Herausgegeben von Erhard Roy Wiehn, Hartung-Gorre Verlag, Konstanz, Germany, 2018.

(4) Israeli-Romanian Relations at the End of the Ceausescu Era: As observed by Israel's Ambassador to Romania 1985-1989 (Hebrew) Magnes Press of the Hebrew University, Jerusalem, 2001; English, Frank Cass, London, 2002; Romanian, University Babes- Bolyai, Cluj-Napoca, Romania 2007.

(5) Israel's Relations with the East European States, from Disruption in 1967 to Resumption in 1989-1991 (Hebrew) Magnes Press of the Hebrew University, Jerusalem, 2009; English, Vallentine Mitchell Publishers, London, 2010. Arabic, Egyptian Institute of Publications and Distribution, Cairo 2016.

(6) Reflections on my Mission as Israel's Ambassador to Austria, Slovenia, and Slovakia, August 1993-December 1995 (Hebrew) Magnes Press of the Hebrew University, Jerusalem, 2016.

(7) Co-Editor with Moshe Yegar and Arye Oded of: Israel's Ministry of Foreign Affairs: The First Fifty Years (Hebrew), Two volumes, Keter Press, Jerusalem, 2002.

=== Research Papers ===
(1) 58 Research Papers on Jewish Communities in the Diaspora and Israel's Foreign Relations;

(2) 26 Encyclopedia Entries (Hebrew) Third volume Supplement, Encyclopedia

Hebraica, Sifriyat Hapoalim, Jerusalem-Tel Aviv, 1995.

(3) Israeli–Austrian Relations: A Personal Retrospective

(4) Milestones in Israel's Relations with East-Central Europe and the Soviet Union: A Timeline

(5) Israeli–Soviet Relations 1953–1967: From Confrontation to Disruption

(6) One Step at a Time: Israeli-Hungarian Relations, 1967–1989

(7) Costa Rica's Forgotten UN Middle East Peace Initiative

(8) In the Shadow of History: Israel's Relations with East Europe, 1967–1991

(9) Ilya Ehrenburg and the Ribbentrop—Molotov Agreement

(10) Romania's Raoul Wallenberg: The Untold Story of Constantin Karadja

(11) Paving a Path from Pankow to Jerusalem: GDR—Israel Relations 1989–1990

(12) From Deep Freeze to Thaw: Relations Between Israel and Czechoslovakia 1967–1990

(13) In Memoriam: Władysław Bartoszewski (1922–2015)

(14) Milestones in Israel's Relations with East-Central Europe and the Soviet Union: A Timeline

(15) The Devils' Alliance: Hitler's Pact with Stalin, 1939–1941
