= Mordechai Palzur =

Israeli diplomat

Mordechai David Palzur (Hebrew: מרדכי פלצור; born 1929, Tarnów, Poland) is an Israeli former military officer, diplomat and chairman of World Jewish Congress.

== Biography ==
Mordechai Plutzer (later Palzur) was born in Tarnow in southeastern Poland. His parents were graduates of Kraków's Jagiellonian University and his father was a professor there. He studied in a non-Jewish school, where he remembers being taunted as a "jew boy."When the Nazis invaded Poland, Palzur and his family were sent to the ghetto. From there, they were deported to Krakow and then transported to Siberia by the Russians. In 1942, they were evacuated to a British army base in Persia. The following year, Tzippora Sharett, later wife of Israel's second prime minister, Moshe Sharett , who was working for the Jewish Agency, arranged for their immigration to Palestine.

Palzur joined the Haganah and fought in the War of Independence. After his release from the army, he joined Israel's diplomatic corps, serving in various positions.

He studied law at the Tel-Aviv School of Law and Economics and later, law, international relations and political science at the Hebrew University of Jerusalem.

== Military career ==
Palzur was injured while serving as an officer during the 1948 Palestine war and was released from military service in 1949. He returned to serve on the General Staff during the Six-Day War. He has been awarded Israeli military distinctions including the Order of the Haganah; Fighters of the State of Israel; Independence Star; and the Six-Day War ribbon.

== Diplomatic career ==
Palzur joined the Foreign Service in 1950 and served in Mexico as Consul (1961–64), in Pretoria as Counselor and Chargé d'Affairs (1969–71), Chargé d'Affairs to Cyprus (1971–74). Because of his efforts at rescuing Israeli journalists during the Turkish invasion of Cyprus in 1974, Palzur was cited for gallantry by the Israeli Foreign Minister, Aluf Yigal Allon. From 1975–78 he served as Ambassador to Bolivia, 1982–86 Ambassador to the Dominican Republic, Antigua and Barbuda, St. Kitts and Nevis, Trinidad and Tobago and Barbados. When he was appointed to Warsaw in 1986, he was “the first Israeli diplomat to serve behind the Iron Curtain since the severance of diplomatic relations by Communist countries as a result of the Six-Day War” serving as Ambassador until 1990.
