= Israeli overtourism in Siargao =

Local concern in the Philippines

Israeli overtourism in Siargao has become a concern among locals amid the 2025 Gaza war over the perceived negative effects of Israeli tourists in the island. Business owners and locals alike have expressed concerns over the alleged disruptive behavior of recent Israeli tourists. Protests have also flared over the construction of a local Chabad house in Siargao.

== Background ==
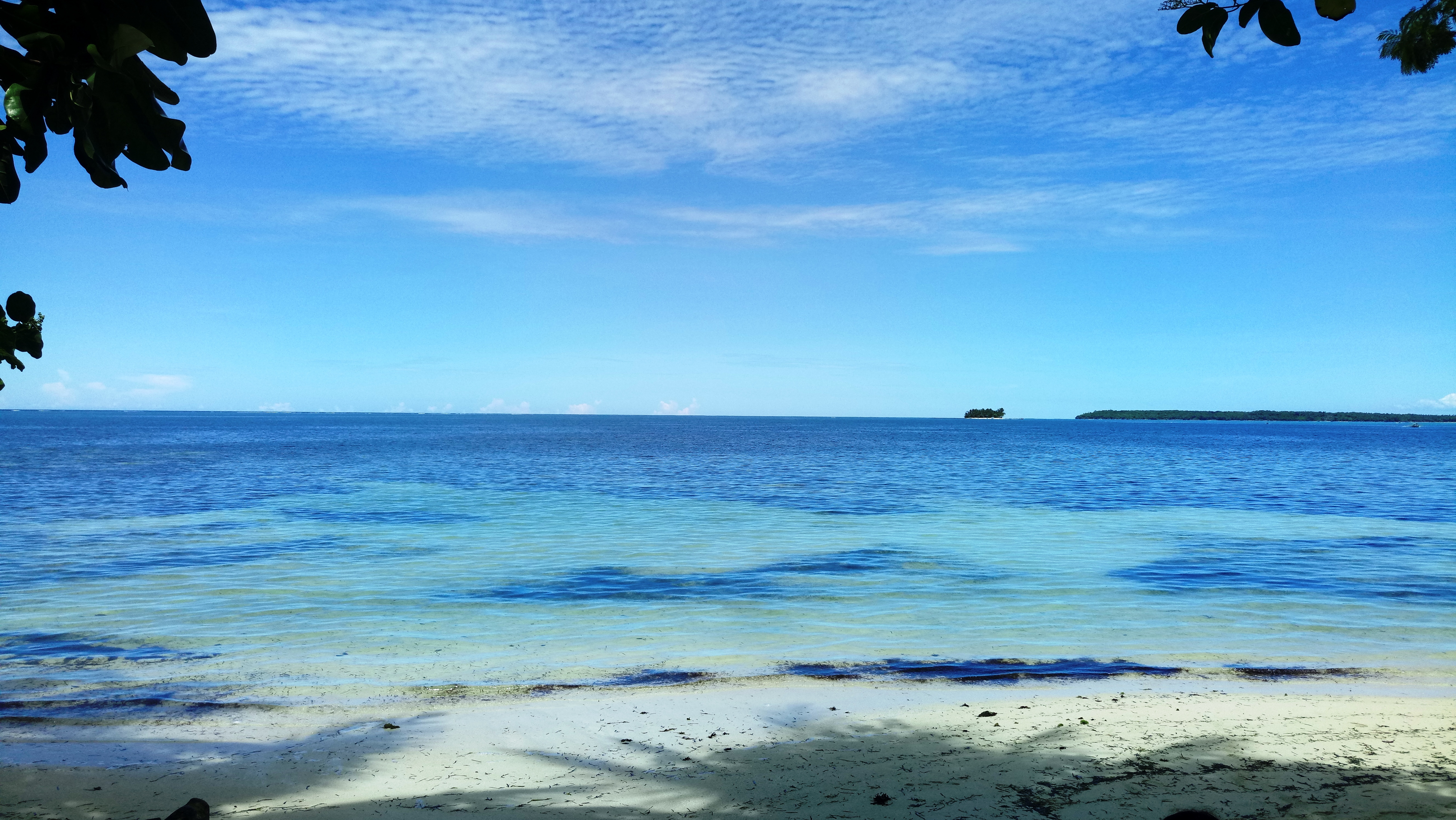
A beach in Siargao

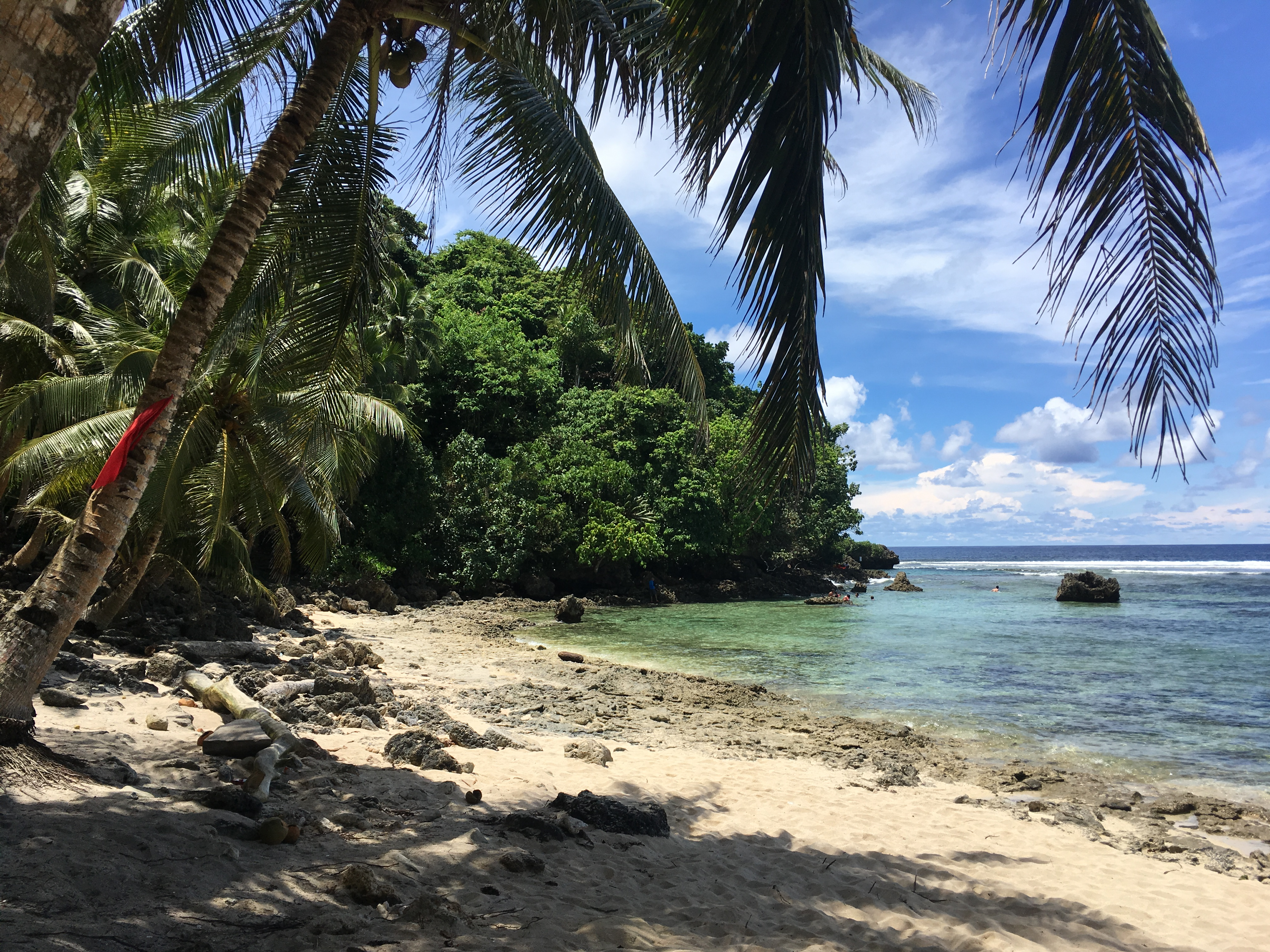
Beachfront in Siargao

Siargao is a tear-drop shaped island in the Philippine Sea situated 196 kilometers southeast of Tacloban. It has a land area of approximately 437 square kilometres (169 sq mi). The island is within the jurisdiction of the province of Surigao del Norte in the mainland Mindanao and is composed of municipalities of Burgos, Dapa, Del Carmen, General Luna, San Benito, Pilar, San Isidro, Santa Monica and Socorro.

Siargao is known as the surfing capital of the Philippines, and was voted the Best Island in Asia in the 2021 Conde Nast Travelers Readers awards. Siargao is a famous tourist destination, well known for its many surfing spots and featured in the film Siargao for such qualities. Surfing is so ingrained in the identity of Siargao, that in 2022, two political families from Surigao Del Norte traded barbs over the cancellation of a national surfing competition hosted on the island. Siargao recorded 529,822 tourist arrivals in 2023 alone, including about 54,000 international visitors and more than 476,000 domestic guests.

=== Siargao as an Israeli tourist destination ===
Following the end of the Twelve-Day War, outbound travel from Israel recovered rapidly. According to Ben Gurion Airport Authority, 1.1 million Israelis traveled abroad in May and June 2025. The growth is linked to the return of international carriers to Israel. The ceasefire with Hezbollah on the Lebanese border in November 2024 and the temporary truce in Gaza in January 2025 helped stabilize air travel and boost demand.

Data from the Department of Trade and Industry (DTI) noted that Israel is ranked as Philippines's 34th trading partner, 30th export market, and 38th import source. On December 4, 2024, Israel's Minister of Tourism Haim Katz, and Philippines's Tourism Secretary Christina Frasco signed a joint declaration to foster cooperation in tourism.

After the improvement of infrastructure in Siargao and its recent redevelopment as a touristic island, in early 2025, it has increasingly become a destination for young Israelis who have finished military service in the Israel Defense Forces during the 2025 Gaza war. There has also been reports among the locale that Israeli business owners actively courted Israeli tourists to Siargao through their networks.

According to a poll published by the Times of Israel, 56% of Israelis fear that they will not be able to travel abroad due to growing international criticism of Israel due to its role in the Gaza War. Israeli tourists have also recently been the target of several high-profile incidents, such as personal attacks and protests.

== Concerns and incidents ==
=== Concerns ===
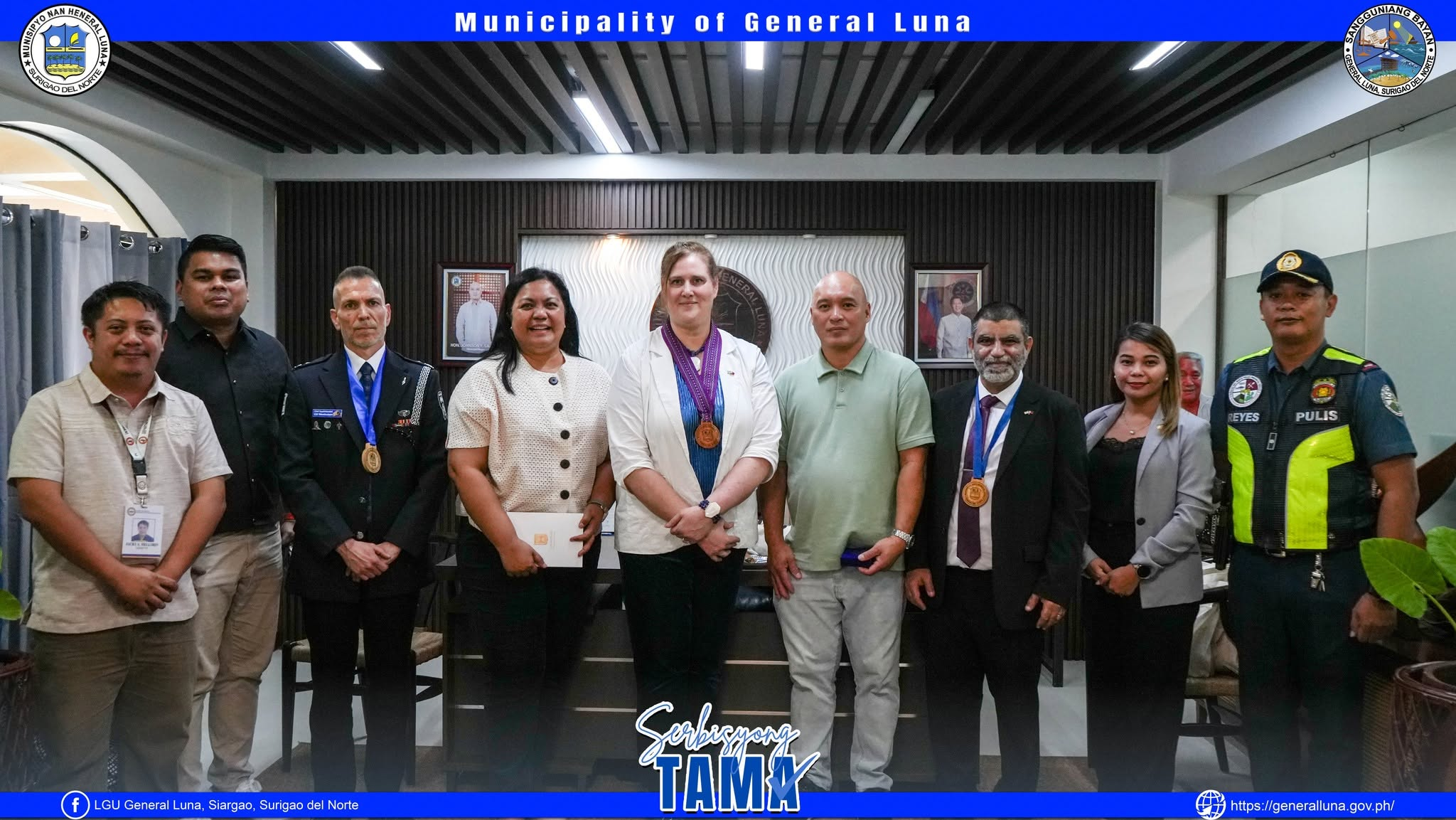
Israeli Ambassador to the Philippines Dana Kursh holds a meeting with General Luna LGU officials on May 11, 2026

Locals and business owners have expressed concern over the alleged misconduct of Israeli tourists. Such incidences have been featured on social media such as on the Facebook group Siargao Business Classified 2.0. In several posts on said Facebook group, incidents such as Israelis calling hospitality staff "slaves", raising the Israeli flag on boats, trashing local homestays and accommodations, violating the island's no-noise curfew past midnight, hurling slurs and physically assaulting bystanders have all been reported. Eyewitnesses also reported harassment of LGBTQ+ people such as throwing stones at trans women. Reports of Israeli tourists allegedly having disrespect for local decorum in cases such as reckless driving, immodest and scantily clad dress in areas requiring a modest dress code and littering on beaches and protected areas have also been recounted.

In March 2025, posts about harassment and abuse from Israeli tourists surfaced in another Facebook group called Siargao Business Association which has about 80,000 followers. Several posts described Israeli tourists not paying for their food using a tactic such as suddenly leaving and disappearing when waiters are busy with attending other customers. Other posts described their general arrogant behavior and incidents such as taking seats in restaurants without ordering and getting angry when asked to vacate for paying customers and threatening to leave negative reviews when confronted due to such misconduct. It has been argued that these kinds of behaviors are not unusual in an industry that positions paying customers above "serving hosts".

In response to concerns over Israeli tourists, Israeli Ambassador to the Philippines Dana Kursh held a meeting with General Luna Mayor Johnson Y. Sajulga, local police officials and locals supportive of the Chabad house on May 10, 2026. On May 12, 2026, a separate meeting between the local business owners’ association and the Israeli ambassador was organized by an Israeli businessman with major business interests in the area.

=== Incidents ===
On April 8, 2026, local police intervened in a brawl between American and Israeli tourists at a bar inside the Siargao Beach Club. The clash was condemned by Israeli Ambassador Dana Kursh and by local officials of General Luna.

== Protests over construction of Chabad house ==
In August 2023, Rabbi Mendel Shpindler and his wife Rivka Shpindler established a local Chabad house affiliated with the global Chabad-Lubavitch movement in Siargao. The Chabad house since then has not only become a place of worship, but also a center for parties and exclusive gatherings for not only Israeli and Jewish tourists but also expatriates.

A petition was filed against the Chabad house citing "zoning, absence of community approval, risk of cultural erosion and safety and security and rampant misconduct by Israeli tourists". The fenced off area around the Chabad house was reportedly called as "Little Israel". Said petition was backed by the Philippine Independent Church and the United Church of Christ in the Philippines (UCCP). These concerns have led to renewed scrutiny over Israel–Philippines relations and the role of Israel in the Israeli–Palestinian conflict. Locals have also expressed alarm over the presence of Israeli nationals who are reportedly members of the Israeli Defense Force (IDF).

In April 2025, Project Paradise, a Siargao-based non-governmental organization, held a town hall with residents and local business owners to gather their complaints. Project Paradise also had a separate meeting with Israeli embassy representatives, who they said had clearly explained that the planned development of a Chabad House in Siargao is not meant for disruptive gatherings.

In May 2025, the Israeli embassy in Manila paid a visit and held a dialogue with Maria Tokong, a local activist who opposed the establishment of the Chabad house. Maria Tokong then made a call to President Bongbong Marcos for strengthened profiling and identification of tourists coming from warzones given the sensitive nature of a tourist island like Siargao.

On September 14, 2025, residents and allied groups held a peaceful one-kilometer solidarity walk at Sunset Bridge in order to accentuate their resistance to what they called the ‘settler colonization’ of Siargao. Organizers initially sought formal support from the local government unit (LGU) but the request was denied on grounds of neutrality. Despite this, the walk proceeded peacefully.

On May 15, 2026, Siargao police awarded a special medal to Chabad-linked Shluchim and discussed increased security coordination and expressed deep appreciation for their cooperation with authorities.

== Reactions ==
=== Philippine government ===
==== National government ====
Tourism Secretary Christina Frasco has responded that they are echoing the sentiments of the island residents. She assured that the DOT has expressed these concerns to the Israeli Embassy in Manila. The DOT remains optimistic that Siargao will continue to thrive as a popular tourist destination despite recent concerns about Israeli overtourism in the island.

The Bureau of Immigration said that foreign nationals in Siargao who violate immigration laws will face sanctions, including possible deportation and blacklisting. It also said that authorities have been monitoring the movements of foreign nationals following reports of alleged misconduct of Israeli tourists. An increased presence of officers was also ordered to monitor complaints about overstaying and disorderly conduct, illegal employment among businesses as well as environmental violations. The Department of Tourism reiterated a stricter code of conduct for visitors.

Solid North Partylist Representative Ching Bernos urged local governments to protect their communities from Israeli tourists.

==== Local government ====
Officials of General Luna, Surigao del Norte, have issued a strong reminder to tourists to behave and refrain from misconduct amid growing concerns in Siargao. While it clarifies that it welcomes tourists from all around the world, all tourists are expected to respect local laws, customs and communities at all times. The public was also encouraged to report incidents of misconduct to authorities through available emergency and police hotlines. Offenders may face penalties such as fines, deportation or other legal actions.

Police Regional Office in the Caraga Region (PRO-13) has expanded its "Bantay Turista" program. Nonetheless, the local police has not released official data on the total number of tourist-related incidents recorded since the start of the year.

=== Israeli government ===
Israeli Ambassador to the Philippines Dana Kursh said Israel does not condone behavior that disrespects local laws and communities. In a dialogue with business owners over Zoom on May 13, 2026, in a response to concerns over IDF veterans in Siargao, the Ambassador touted her Israel Defense Forces background. She urged Siargao locals not to "politicize" alleged incidents of harassment linked to Israeli tourists and IDF veterans, as such isolated incidents do not define an entire community of visitors. The ambassador also clarified that Chabad is not an Israeli entity, but is merely a Jewish cultural institution and is also not meant to proselytize Judaism to local residents.

=== Others ===
Filipina former actress Andi Eigenmann expressed her displeasure over Israeli tourists in Siargao.

== See also ==
- Tourism in the Philippines
- Siargao
- Israel-Philippines relations
- Overtourism
- Anti-Zionism
