= Philippines and the Holocaust =

President Manuel L. Quezon admitted roughly 1,200–1,300 Jews fleeing from Nazi Germany, German-occupied Europe, and Shanghai in Japanese-occupied China to the Philippine Commonwealth from 1937 to 1941.

== Background ==
Even prior to the onset of the World War II, Jewish people fleeing from persecution by Nazi Germany were able to reach the Philippines. In 1935, Jews in Germany were subject to anti-Semitic Nuremberg Laws which stripped them of certain rights.

Jewish refugees were admitted to the archipelago due to the effort of Philippine President Manuel L. Quezon and United States High Commissioner Paul V. McNutt.

The plan was first conceptualized in 1937, when Jewish refugees arrived in Manila from the Shanghai Ghetto who were evacuated by the Germans following fighting between the Chinese and the Japanese. The Jewish Refugee Committee was established to help their settlement in the Philippines and was headed by Philip Frieder. The Frieders would learn about first account information about the atrocities of Nazi Germany from the refugees.

The Frieder brothers would approach their poker buddies; McNutt, Quezon, Colonel Dwight D. Eisenhower, and Field Marshal Douglas MacArthur for help. They were able to come up with a plan where they intend to admit as many as 100,000 Jews to the Philippines.

Quezon pushed back against critics of the Philippine government's admission of Jewish refugees. He institutionalized the Open Door policy by issuing Proclamation No. 173 on August 21, 1937, which urged Filipinos to welcome refugees and aid them. This became the basis of Commonwealth Act No. 613, later the Philippine Immigration Act of 1940.

Among critics of Quezon's policy were anti-Semitic members within his cabinet as well as opposition politicians such as former President Emilio Aguinaldo who viewed the Jews as "Communists and schemers" bent on "controlling the world".

McNutt was tasked to convince the US State Department to issue as many visas as possible to Jewish refugees who sought to flee to the Philippines. Eisenhower was to devise a plan to help Jewish refugees settle in Mindanao. The United States government rejected the original plan and only allowed the admission of 10,000 Jews in the Philippines or 1,000 Jews annually within a period of ten years.

Quezon would also use his house, the Marikina Hall in Marikina (now located in Quezon City) as a place for Jewish refugees.

Around 1,200 to 1,300 Jewish refugees from 1937 to 1941 were able to find their way to the Philippines. Most of them are European Jews who escaped Nazi Germany and consequentially the Holocaust. They would be known as the Manilaners. However, they had to live through the Japanese occupation of the Philippines which put the Open Door policy to a halt.

The Philippine Commonwealth was temporarily relegated to a government-in-exile based in the United States. Quezon would die while in New York in 1944.

After World War II, most refugees chose to leave the Philippines.

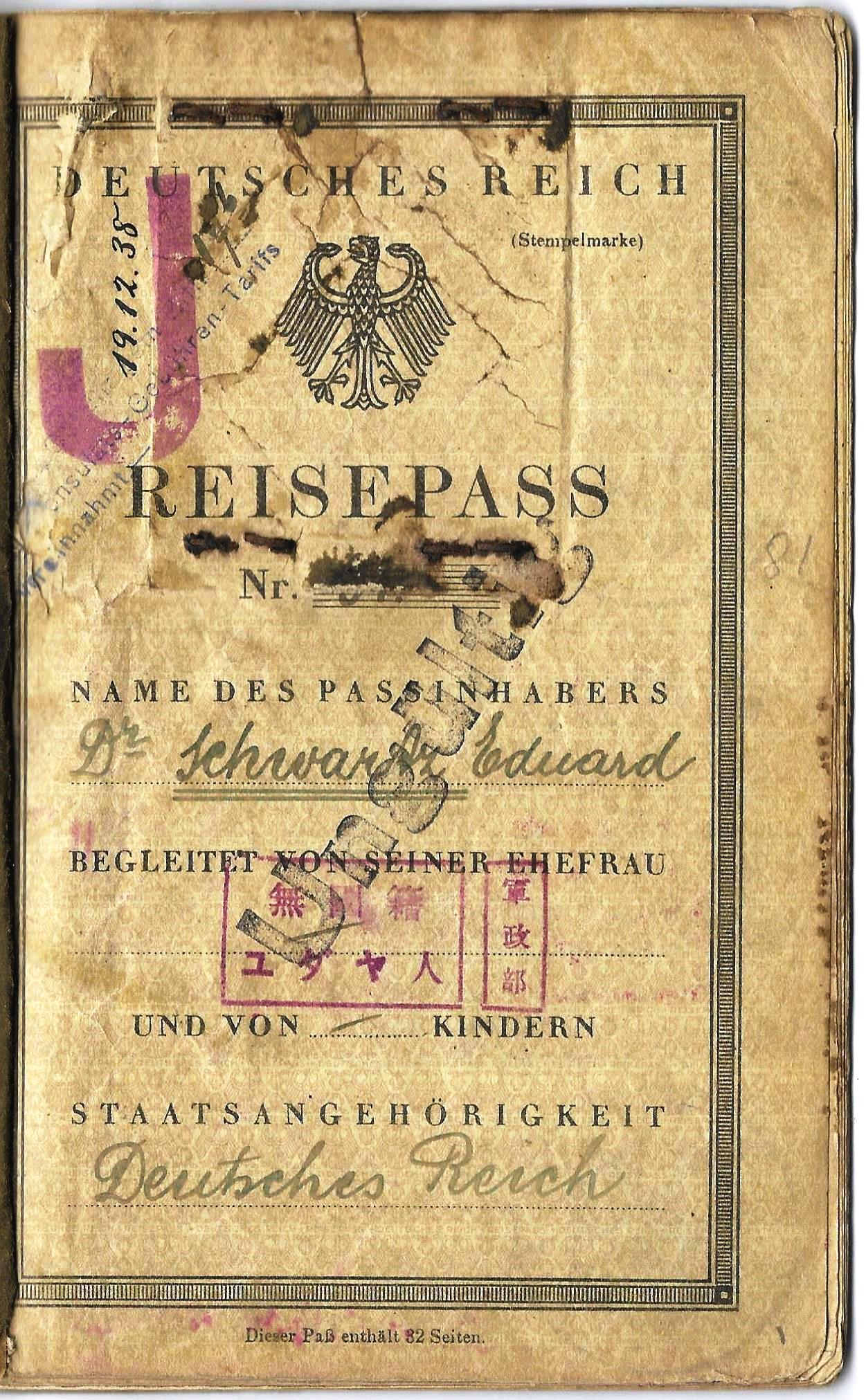
German passport issued to a Jewish refugee who was admitted to Manila in 1938.

== Legacy ==
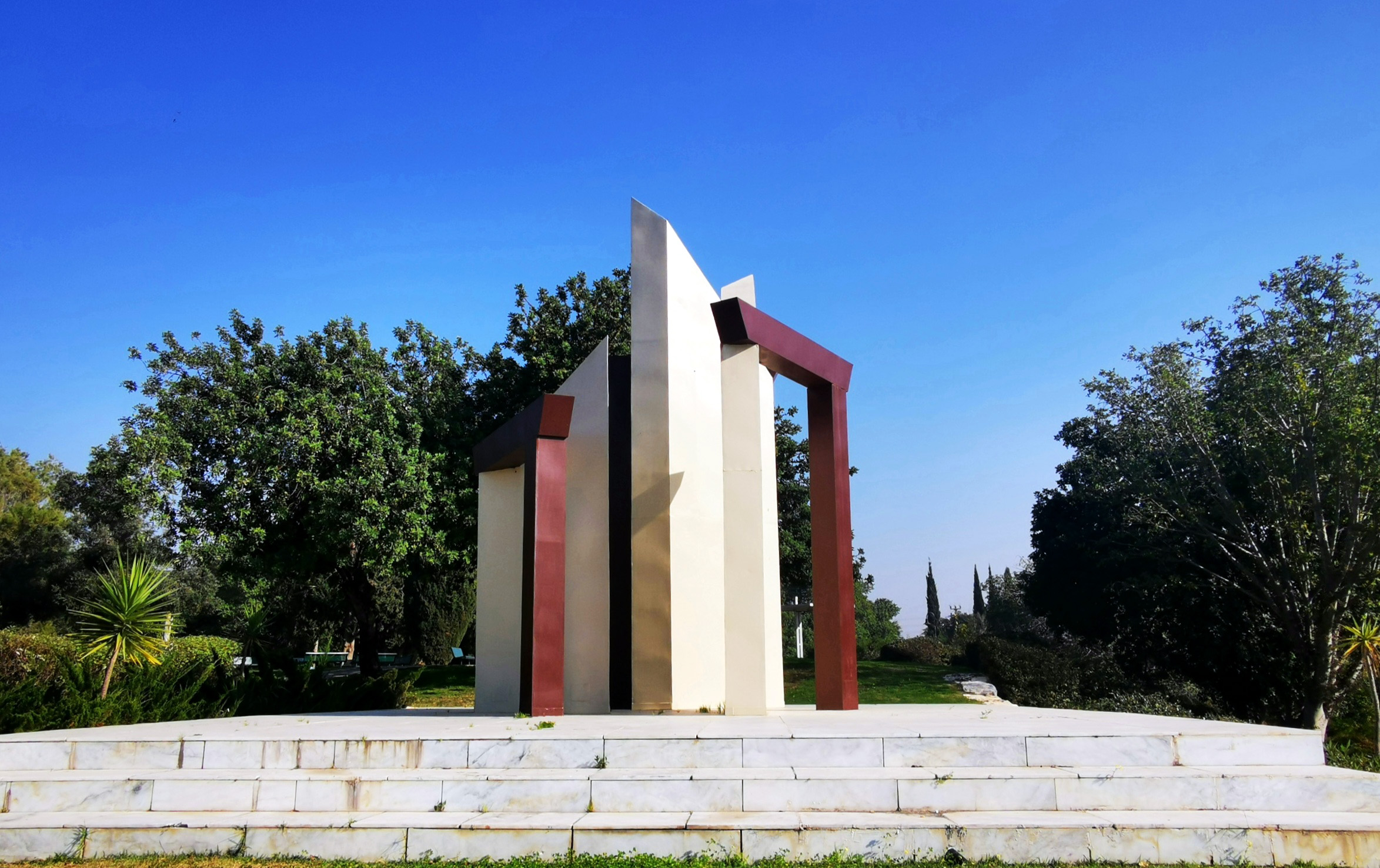
Open Doors Monument in Rishon Lezion, Israel.

Quezon was posthumously given the Raoul Wallenberg Foundation Medal for his Open Door policy in 2015. The honor was received by his daughter, Nini Quezon-Avanceña.

Monuments have been installed in commemoration of Quezon's Open Door policy. In 2009, the Open Doors monument was unveiled at the Holocaust Memorial Park in Rishon Lezion in Israel. The design of the monument is a winning entry of a competition in 2007 by the National Commission for Culture and the Arts. It was made by Jun Yee.

The Philippine-Israel Friendship Park within the Quezon Memorial Circle in Quezon City has a monument which commemorates Israel–Philippines relations. Inaugurated in 2018, the park monument featured a relief depicting the plan.

Quezon's policy is also cited as a reason why Filipino citizens can visit Israel visa-free.

== In popular culture ==
The fleeing of Jews to the Philippines was subject of several published works.

Frank Ephraim wrote Escape to Manila: From Nazi Tyranny to Japanese Terror compiling his own and other Jews' accounts of their ordeal.

Quezon's Open door policy has also been featured in documentaries such as An Open Door: Jewish Rescue in the Philippines a 2012 work by Noel Izon and The Last Manilaners a 2020 iWant production directed by Nico Hernandez. It was also the subject of the 2018 Philippine feature film Quezon's Game which starred Raymond Bagatsing who portrayed the role of President Quezon. It was directed by British Jew and Philippines-resident Matthew Rosen.

== See also ==
- Israel–Philippines relations
- History of the Jews in the Philippines
- White Russian refugees in the Philippines
- Philippine Refugee Processing Center
