= Embassy of the Philippines, Tel Aviv =

Diplomatic mission of the Philippines in Israel

Embassy of the Philippines, Tel Aviv Pasuguan ng Pilipinas sa Tel Aviv שגרירות הפיליפינים בתל אביב

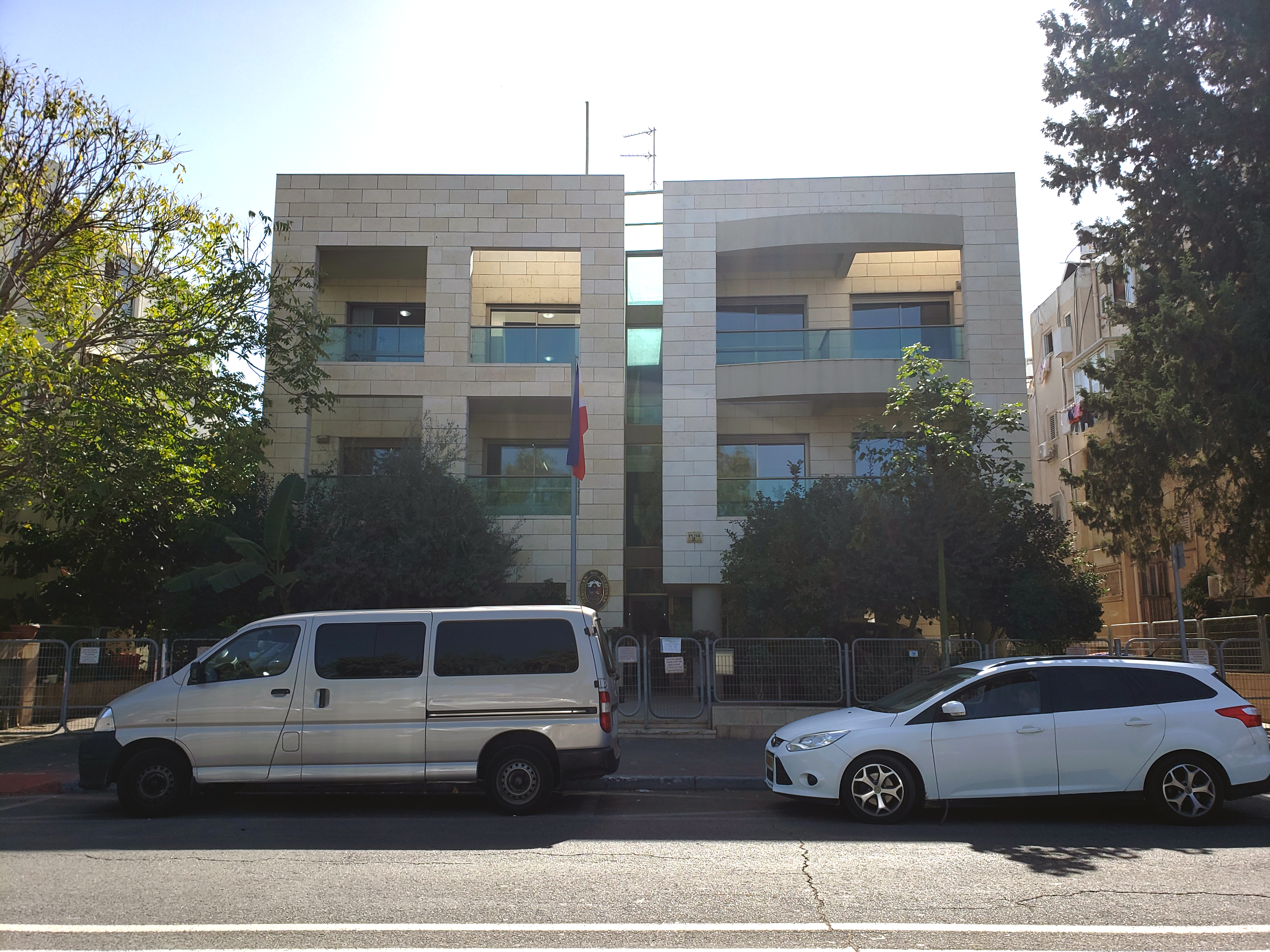
- Location: Tel Aviv
- Address: 18 Bnei Dan Street
- Coordinates: 32°05′42.9″N 34°47′10.1″E
- Ambassador: Aileen S. Mendiola
- Website: tel-avivpe.dfa.gov.ph

The Embassy of the Philippines in Tel Aviv is the diplomatic mission of the Republic of the Philippines to the State of Israel. Opened in 1962, it is located on 18 Bnei Dan Street (Hebrew: רחוב בני דן 18) in the Yehuda HaMaccabi neighborhood of central Tel Aviv, across from Yarkon Park.

== History ==
The Philippine Embassy in Tel Aviv was opened in 1962, five years after the establishment of diplomatic relations between the Philippines and Israel. Its opening coincided with that of the Israeli Embassy in Manila that same year.

In 2012, the embassy's website was hacked by a hacker who identified himself as "RcP" amid increased tension between Israeli troops and Hamas in the Gaza Strip.

=== Proposed relocation to Jerusalem ===
In December 2017, the Israeli Ministry of Foreign Affairs claimed that the Philippines was one of at least ten countries reportedly looking to relocate its embassy from Tel Aviv to Jerusalem, following the decision of the United States to do so earlier in the month. The Department of Foreign Affairs (DFA) denied that such a move was being discussed, citing its support for a two-state solution as part of the wider Israeli–Palestinian peace process.

DFA Undersecretary Ernesto Abella again denied in August 2018 that the Philippine government was considering moving the embassy to Jerusalem when he mentioned that it was not a part of President Rodrigo Duterte's agenda for his then-upcoming state visit to Israel.

== Staff and activities ==
The Philippine Embassy in Tel Aviv is currently headed by Ambassador Aileen S. Mendiola, who was appointed by President Bongbong Marcos on January 23, 2025. Prior to her appointment as ambassador, Mendiola, a career diplomat, served as Assistant Secretary of the DFA's Office of Asian and Pacific Affairs. Her appointment was confirmed by the Commission on Appointments on February 4, 2025, and she presented her credentials to Israeli President Isaac Herzog on April 21, 2025.

The embassy's activities center around providing to the welfare of Filipinos in Israel, many of whom are Overseas Filipino Workers (OFWs). Following the death of a Filipino worker from a bomb explosion in Haifa in 2001, the embassy organized text brigades to quickly disseminate information to Filipinos throughout the country, while in 2005, Ambassador Antonio Modena protested the treatment of Filipinos entering or exiting Israel, many of whom were subjected to excess security screening or were segregated from other departing or arriving foreigners.

At the start of the 2023 Israel-Hamas war, the embassy temporarily closed because of the security situation while continuing to operate an emergency hotline and monitor reports that several Filipinos may have been captured.

In addition to catering to the welfare of Filipinos in Israel, the Philippine Embassy in Tel Aviv also provides assistance to nationals of member countries of the Association of Southeast Asian Nations (ASEAN) which do not have a diplomatic presence in Israel, such as with the case of 12 Malaysians detained by Israeli authorities following the 2010 Gaza flotilla raid.

== See also ==
- Israel–Philippines relations
- Filipinos in Israel
- List of diplomatic missions of the Philippines
- Embassy of Israel, Manila
