= Israel–Philippines relations =

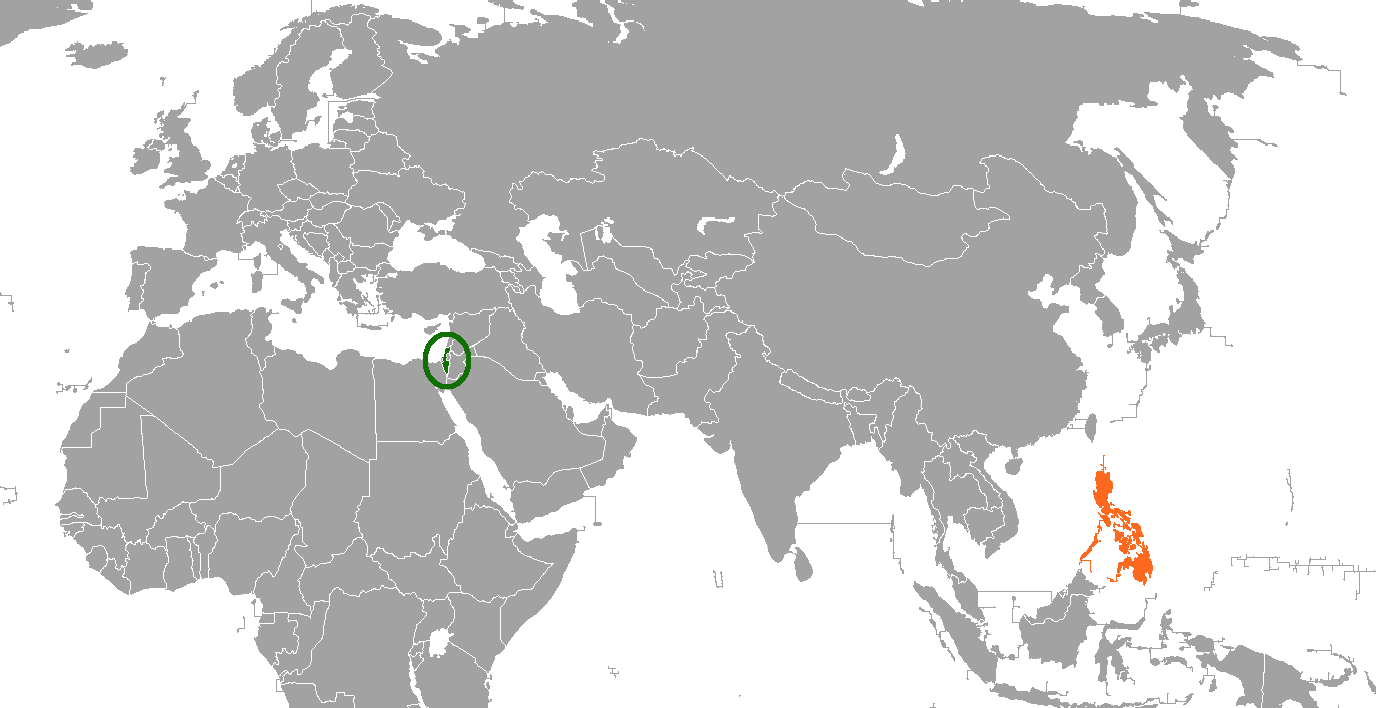

- Israel: Philippines

Diplomatic mission
- Embassy of Israel, Manila: Embassy of the Philippines, Tel Aviv

Envoy
- Ambassador Dana Kursh: Ambassador Aileen Mendiola-Rau

Israel–Philippines relations refers to the bilateral ties between the State of Israel and the Republic of the Philippines.

Full diplomatic relations between the two countries were established upon the signing of the Treaty of Friendship on February 26, 1958. The Israeli embassy in Manila and the Philippine embassy in Tel Aviv both opened in 1962.

== History ==
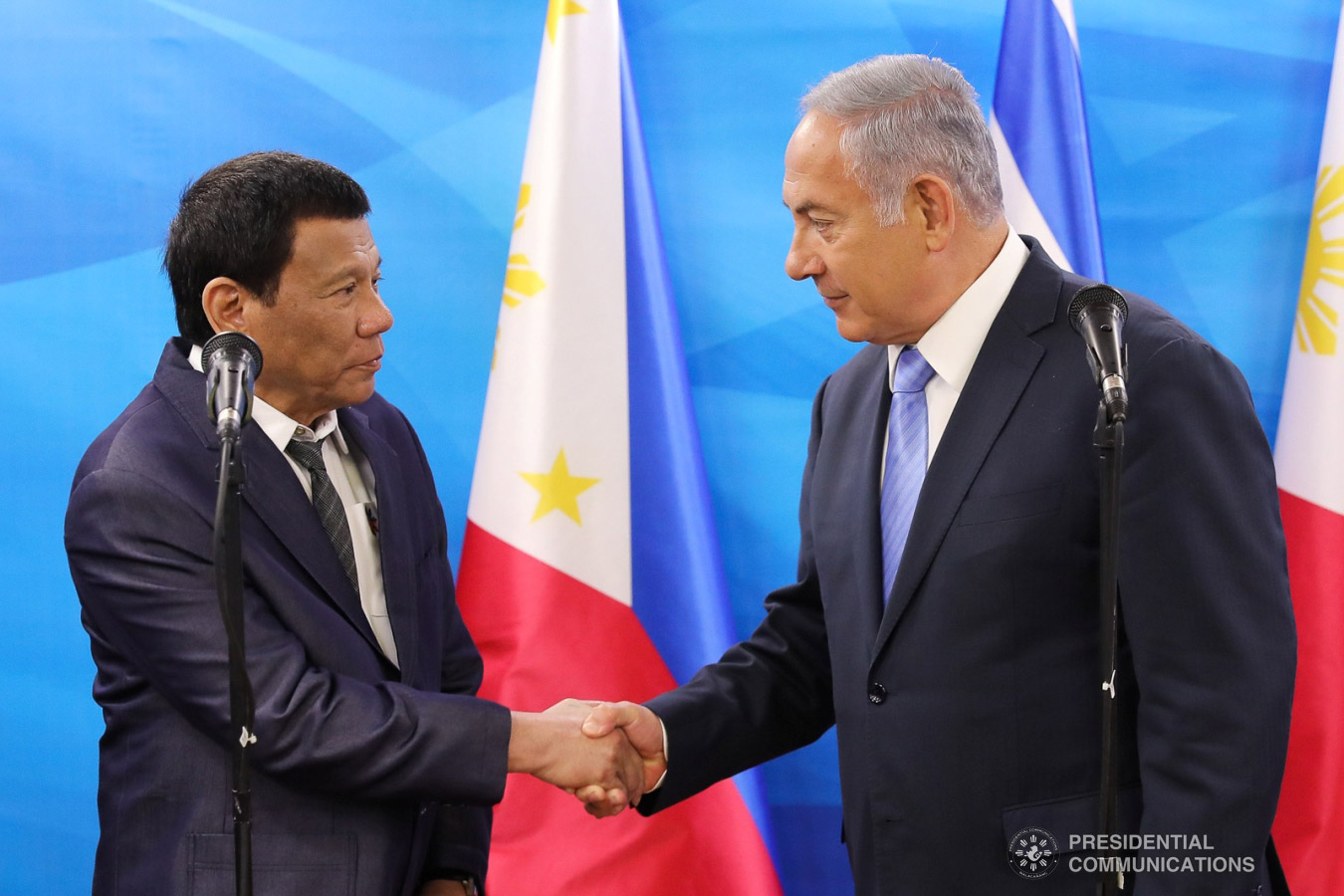
Philippine president Rodrigo Duterte with Israeli prime minister Benjamin Netanyahu during the former's state visit to Israel in 2018

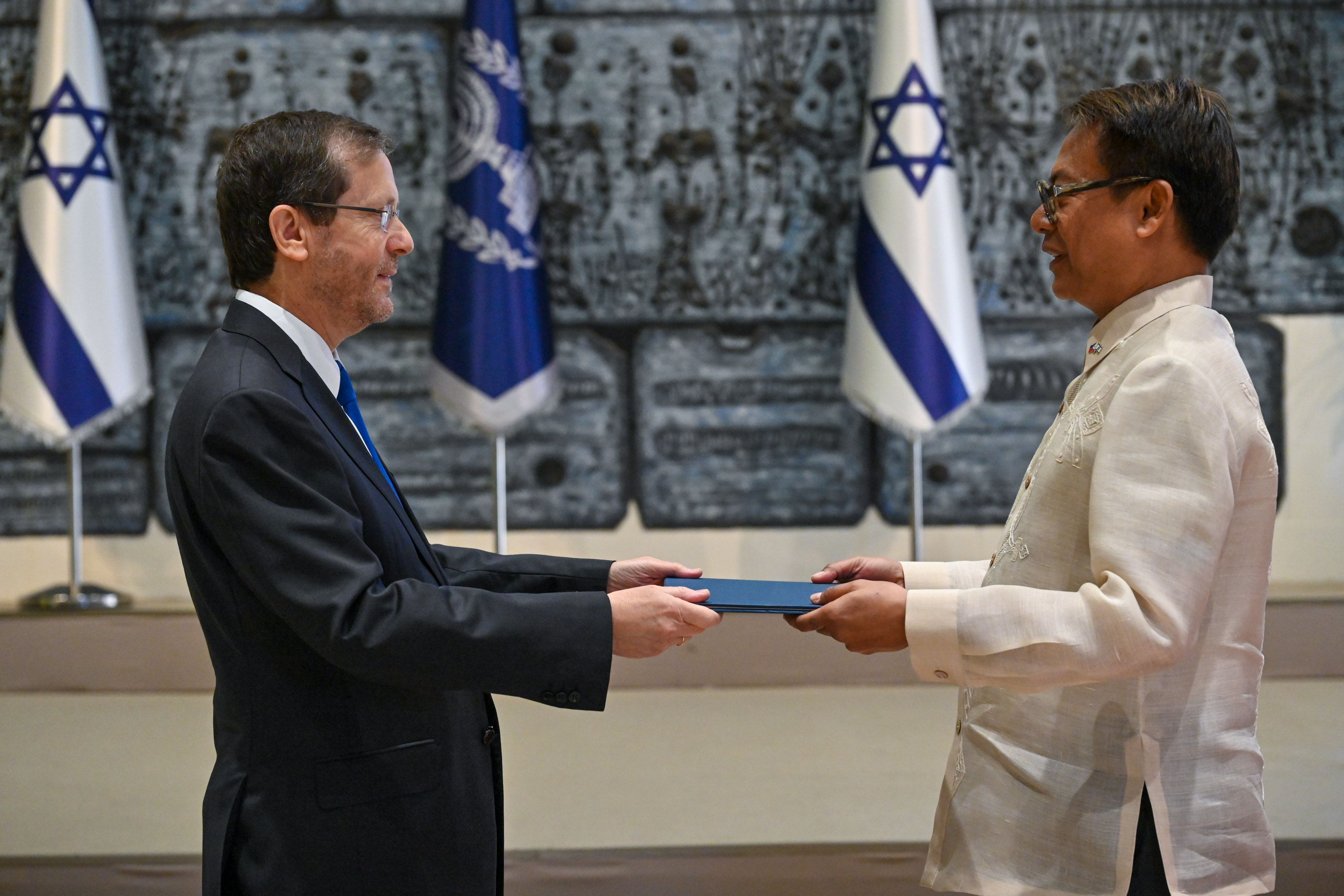
Israeli president Isaac Herzog with then-Philippine ambassador to Israel, Pedro R. Laylo Jr. in 2023

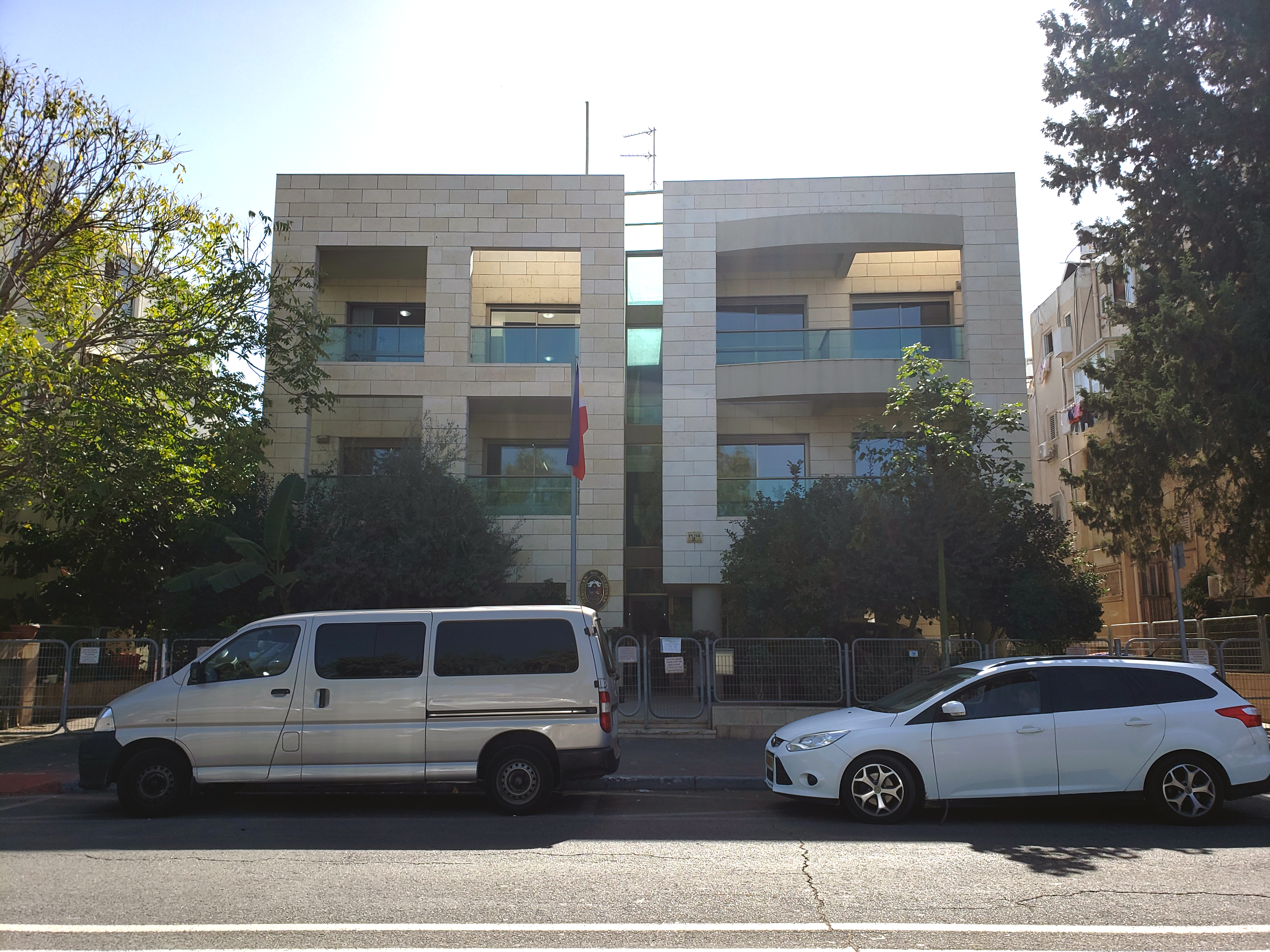
The Philippine embassy in Tel Aviv

More than a thousand German and Austrian Jews escaped to the Philippines when no other country accepted them. The rescue strategy was decided while playing cards and smoking cigars by President Manuel L. Quezon, American high commissioner Paul McNutt, and members of the Frieder family. President Quezon opened the country's doors to the fleeing refugees as "it was the right thing to do". McNutt jeopardized his career as he persuaded the U.S. government to issue thousands of working visas for the Jews, while the Frieder brothers provided jobs in their own cigar factory. The Frieder brothers also raised money to transport the Jews to Manila and established shelters and schools.

The Philippines voted in favor of UN Resolution 181 recommending the partition of Palestine and the establishment of a Jewish State in 1947. The Philippines was among the 33 countries that supported the establishment of Israel and the only Asian country that voted for the resolution. Israel and the Philippines established full diplomatic relationships in 1957.

Embassies were opened in Tel Aviv and Manila in 1962. In that same year, Israeli foreign minister Golda Meir visited Manila and was received by President Diosdado Macapagal, who also visited Israel during his tenure as vice-president.

In 1997, the two countries signed a memorandum of understanding institutionalizing the bilateral political dialogue between the respective foreign ministries. The political dialogue is accompanied by cooperation in trade and economy, culture, technical assistance, science, academic exchanges, and tourism, among others.

On November 28, 2007, the Knesset honored the thirty-three countries that supported the UN Resolution 181 in celebration of the 60th anniversary of the State of Israel. The UN resolution, which marked January 27 as a yearly commemoration to honor the Holocaust's victims, was co-sponsored by the Philippines.

In October 2012, Vice President Jejomar Binay embarked on a five-day visit to Israel during which he met with President Shimon Peres in Jerusalem.

In September 2018, President Rodrigo Duterte was in Israel for a four-day visit, making him the first sitting Filipino president to visit the Jewish state. President Duterte sought to reaffirm the people-to-people ties between the two nations based on shared history.

== Economic relations ==
Trade between Israel and the Philippines continues to grow but remains insignificant compared to Israel's trade industry with Europe and the Americas. Israel's exports to the Philippines remain higher in comparison to the Philippines' exports to Israel. Israeli exports amount to $248,448,918 while Filipino exports amount to $33,929,631 in 2007. The number one exports to each other by both countries are electronics.

In 2004, there were 37,155–50,000 Filipino workers in Israel.

== Cultural relations ==
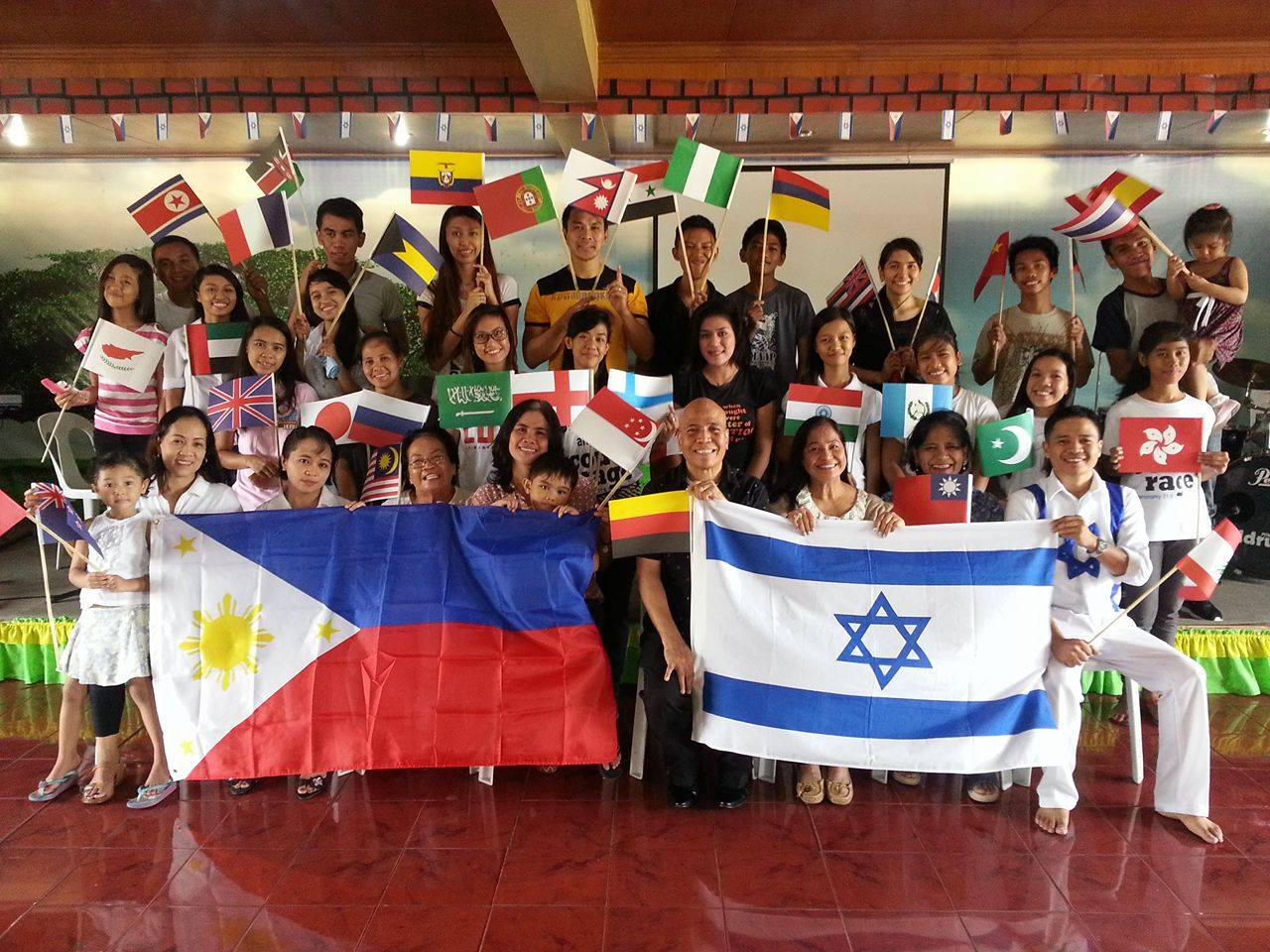
Bishop Armando Cruzem and his congregation at their local annual Day to Praise Israel Independence Day event in the Philippines, 12 May 2016

In 2007, Grace Galindez-Gupana, a Filipino businesswoman and supporter of Israel, financed the installation of a giant Israeli flag to honor 50 years of friendly relations between Israel and the Philippines.

In 2009, the Open Doors Monument was erected in the Holocaust Memorial Park in Rishon Lezion, Israel. It honored the role of the Philippine Commonwealth government under President Manuel L. Quezon in officially offering safe haven and issuing 10,000 visas to Jewish refugees fleeing the Nazi regime. This was done in coordination with US Commonwealth officials (including High Commissioner Paul V. McNutt and Lt. Col. Dwight D. Eisenhower) as well as the local Jewish-Filipino community. Between 1937 and 1941, approximately 1,200 to 1,500 Jewish refugees (mostly from Germany and Austria) were settled in government-provided housing communities in Marikina. Additional plans were made to increase the visas allocated to 100,000 and to allow the refugees to resettle in the then sparsely populated island of Mindanao, but these could not be carried out due to the Japanese invasion of the Philippines in December 1941. Quezon's actions were notable because the Philippines was one of the few nations that unconditionally opened its doors to Jewish refugees. Quezon was also one of the few heads of state to openly condemn the Nazi persecution of Jews, prior to the outbreak of World War II.

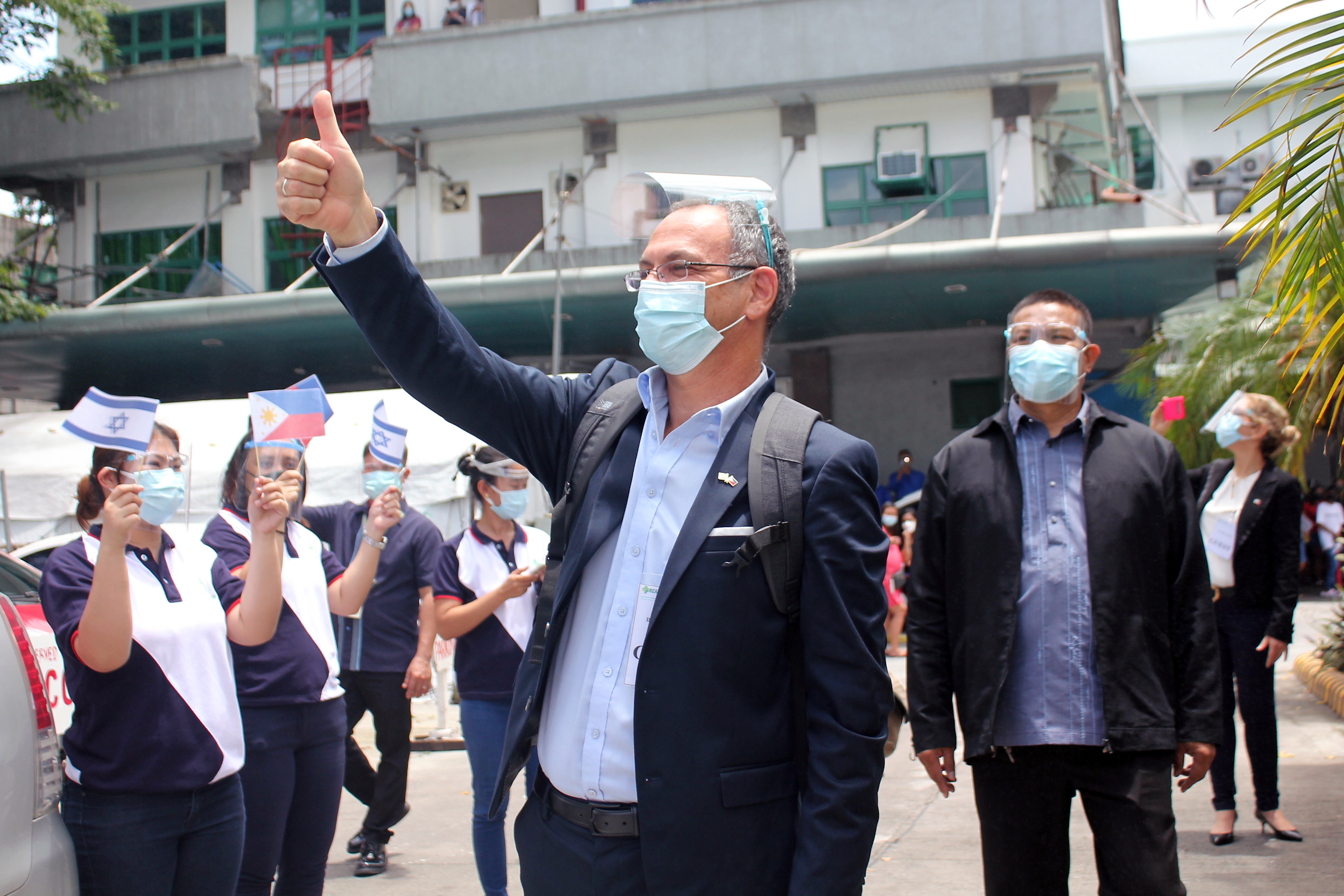
Israeli infectious diseases and COVID-19 specialist, Dr. Guy Choshen, at the Rizal Medical Center in Pasig

The Philippine Fair is an annual event in Haifa. In July 2013, the two-day fair opened at the Castra mall, organized by the Philippine Embassy in Tel Aviv and the Municipality of Haifa. The fair features booths selling Filipino handicrafts and food, as well as a cultural program showcasing traditional Filipino music and dance. A photography exhibition, "Yesterday and Today: A Look at Philippines-Israel Relations through the Years," opened at the mall. Some of the images date to the Philippines' "Open Door Policy" in the 1930s, when more than 1,200 European Jews fleeing the Holocaust were given a safe haven in the Philippines.

== Security ties ==
In January 2014, the Armed Forces of the Philippines agreed to purchase 28 Israeli armored vehicles.

In May 2018, the Philippine Navy purchased Spike-ER missiles from Rafael Advanced Defense Systems. These are the first surface-to-surface missiles to be mounted on Philippine Navy ships.

The Philippines uses a variety of Israeli weapons such as Israeli firearms like the Galil and TAR-21. The Soltam M-71 155 mm howitzer is used by the Philippine Army and Marines.

In 2023, it was revealed that Elbit Systems would supply the Philippine army with long-range maritime patrol aircraft equipped with advanced intelligence systems.

The Philippine Navy operates the Acero-class patrol gunboats based on Israel's Shaldag V-class patrol boats. It also uses Spike-NLOS, an Israeli fire-and-forget missile.

The Philippines in May 2025 reportedly froze new defense contracts with Israeli firms to pressure Israel to take its side over China in the South China Sea dispute.

In December 2025, acting Philippine police chief Lt. Gen. Jose Melencio Nartatez met with Israeli ambassador Dana Kursh at Camp Crame in Quezon City to strengthen police cooperation between the two countries. They discussed concrete steps such as intelligence sharing, personnel exchanges, and joint training. The goal is to improve crime prevention, emergency response, and community policing in the Philippines, in line with President Bongbong Marcos's push to modernize the Philippine National Police and expand international security partnerships.

== Aid to the Philippines ==
MASHAV is Israel's international development cooperation program. It was launched in 1957 with the purpose of spreading knowledge and related technologies which helped in the country's rapid development.

Various MASHAV courses are being offered in the Philippines. Recently, the program offered new courses for the country which includes: International Training on Clean Technologies, Course on Developing and Organizing a Trauma System and MCS Organization, Feeding the Future: Food Safety and Technology in times of Global Change and Commercial Beekeeping in Modern Agriculture. Moreover, the program keeps its contacts with former course applicants for them to be part of the Shalom Club–it serves as forum for all MASHAV alumni. There are over 70 shalom clubs worldwide in which the members are encouraged to participate in social and professional activities, to attend fund-raising events, lectures ranging from AIDS education and business management and exchange ideas about a certain issue. The embassy of Israel in Manila is a partner of the Shalom Club in the Philippines. Their goal is to seek human and sustainable development, as well as to improve bilateral relations of the two countries. The main activities conducted by the club are feeding programs and donation missions.

In November 2013, when Typhoon Haiyan hit the Philippines, the Israeli government sent a team of 148 members from the Israel Defense Forces (IDF) assisted by the Ministry of Foreign Affairs (MFA). The MFA reconstructed buildings, restored water supply, and set up a field hospital to provide immediate medical response such as delivery of babies, perform surgeries and treatment of more than 2,800 victims. The IDF also conducted search and rescue operations and sent relief goods for the people affected by the disaster. Numerous organizations and institutions from Israel likewise helped the victims of the typhoon, such as IsraAID (Israel forum for international Humanitarian Aid), Boys town Jerusalem, Israeli Relief Coalition and other volunteers from Israel has sent medical assistance to the victims.

Israeli disaster assistance continued after later storms: after Typhoon Rai in 2021 and Typhoon Megi in 2022, IsraAID said it provided access to safe water and hygiene kits and later training for tribal leaders, while in 2024, the Embassy of Israel and MASHAV, in partnership with Caritas Philippines, donated shelter-repair kits to about 50 households affected by Typhoon Doksuri in the Ilocos Region.

== Agricultural cooperation ==
The Center for International Cooperation (MASHAV) and the center for International Agricultural Development Cooperation (CINADCO) of Israel, together with Central Luzon State University (CLSU), Department of Agrarian Reform (DAR), and Nueva Ecija Provincial Government of Philippines formed the PICAT Project on June 19, 2006. Its main purpose is to establish an agricultural training center that would stimulate better farm productivity, sustainability and profitability for the families in the region of Nueva Ecija, and then was launched in other provinces such as Bulacan, Tarlac, and Pampanga.

== Diaspora ==
As of 2013, an estimated number of 31,000 Filipinos are residing in Israel. Most of the Filipino migrants work as caregivers while a small portion works in hotels and restaurants. Among them is Rose Fostanes, who won the inaugural season of The X Factor Israel (2013–2014). Furthermore, two documentary films focusing on Filipino workers based in Israel were shown in the Philippines and Israel: Paper Dolls (2006) and Transit (2013).

== Israeli overtourism in Siargao ==
Since 2025, locals in Siargao have expressed concern over the negative impact of Israeli tourists in the island and alarm over the growing presence of Israeli nationals who are reportedly members of the IDF. A petition was filed against plans to construct a Chabad house there, citing "zoning, absence of community approval, risk of cultural erosion and safety and security and rampant misconduct by Israeli tourists". Said petition was backed by the Philippine Independent Church and the United Church of Christ in the Philippines.

On September 14, 2025, residents and allied groups held a one-kilometer solidarity walk at Sunset Bridge in General Luna, Surigao del Norte, to accentuate their resistance to what they called the "settler colonization" of Siargao.

Locals and business owners have also expressed concern over the alleged misconduct of Israeli tourists. Eyewitnesses reported various claimed incidents, such as harassment of LGBTQ+ people, including throwing stones at trans women and hurling slurs at bystanders on streets. Occurrences such as staff and natives being called "slaves" have also been recounted.

In August 2025, Philippine tourism secretary Christina Frasco said that the Department of Tourism (DOT) has expressed these concerns to the Israeli embassy in Manila. On April 7, 2026, the Bureau of Immigration assured that foreign nationals in Siargao who violate immigration laws will face sanctions.

== See also ==
- History of the Jews in the Philippines
- Filipinos in Israel
- Palestine–Philippines relations
- Siargao
