= Tony Marioghae =

Nigerian bishop and missionary based in the Philippines

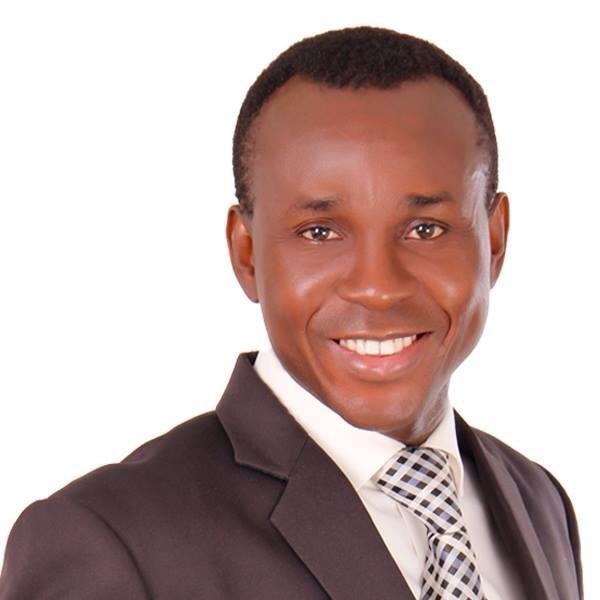
- Title: Presiding Bishop

Personal life
- Born: Tony Arerieva Adede Marioghae; October 1, 1970 Nigeria
- Education: University of Jos

Religious life
- Religion: Christian Pentecostal Evangelical
- Institute: TEAM International

Senior posting
- Period in office: 2005 - present

Arerieva Adede Tony Marioghae (born October 1, 1970) is the president of The Evangelical Ark Mission (TEAM) International. He is a conference speaker, reformer, educator, consultant and author.

== Education ==
Tony Marioghae graduated from the University of Jos, Nigeria with a diploma in mass communications in 1995 and bachelor's degree in political science in 2000. He also obtained a Master of Arts and a Doctor of Philosophy in transformational leadership from the Northwestern Christian University, Philippines.

== Activism and ministry ==
In 2005, Tony Marioghae and the Regional Director for TEAM Asia, Ricardo Sio launched the global “Shine Philippines” Movement, a Non-Government Organization (NGO) which champions the spiritual reformation and the national transformation of institutions in Philippines.

Marioghae was appointed by Gov. Rafael P. Nantes Special Adviser to the Governor of Quezon province, Philippines, and a consultant to the provincial government; he held this position from 2007 to 2010. He worked promoting tourism in the province.

In November 8, 2008, he was named Bishop by the Christian Bishops and Ministers Association of the Philippines (CBMAP) in collaboration with Eagles World Evangelism Council of Bishops (EWECOB). He was the youngest Evangelical Pentecostal Minister consecrated in the Philippines. He was also the first African to be ordained by CBMAP.

Marioghae is also the president of Nigerians in Diaspora (NIDOPHIL) Philippines and a Director at Beyond Wellness Inc.

In 2012 he built in Lucena City the first Pentecostal Christian Cathedral in the Philippines. Afterwards in 2019, he completed a multi-million-dollar convention center in Las Piñas City; which is one of the largest church buildings in the nation.

== Recognitions and achievements ==
- Activist of the Year 2000 by the Department of Political Science, University of Jos, Nigeria
- 2007: Certificate of Appreciation by De La Salle - College of Saint Benilde, Manila, Republic of the Philippines
- 2007: Certificate of Appreciation by the Holy Spirit Revival Movement International, Singapore
- 2010: Certificate of Appreciation by the Philippine National Police Headquarters
- 2011: Certificate of Appreciation by the Municipality of Santol
- 2011: Doctor of Divinity (Honoris Causa) by Theology University, Quezon City, Republic of the Philippines
- 2011: Doctor of International Relations (Honoris Causa) by Zoe Life Theological College, Philadelphia, USA
- 2013: Doctor of Philosophy in Transformational Leadership (Honoris Causa) by Northwestern Christian University, Philippines
- 2014: The Prestigious Key to Lucena City
- 2014: Dakilang Ama Award (Honorable Father) Republic of the Philippines
- 2015: Honorary Citizenship Award, Marinduque Province of the Republic of the Philippines
- 2015: Certificate of Appreciation by the Embassy of Nigeria, Republic of the Philippines
- 2016: Acrh-Bishop Margaret Benson Idahosa Leadership Award, Pasay City, Philippines
- 2016: Sword of God Award, Pasay City, Philippines
- 2022: Advocate for Israel Award, Daystar TV
- 2024: Special Recognitions, Embassies of Nigeria and Israel in the Philippines
- 2025: Key of Candelaria Municipality, Quezon, Philippines
- 2025: The Icons of Change award, Southville International School and Colleges in Las Piñas City, Metro Manila.

== Books ==
- There is a miracle in your storm - Tehilah's Creation Publishing, Philippines, 2003
- Think Abundance. Learn the Secret and Achieve Big Things - 1st published by Maximum Impact Consult, Nigeria, 2006
- Precepts of Wisdom - Tehilah's Creation Publishing, Philippines, 2013 - ISBN 978-971-95779-0-4
- Saved and Empowered - Tehilah's Creation Publishing, Philippines, 2014 - ISBN 978-971-95779-1-1
