= Israeli permit regime =

Israel issues a work permit regime in the occupied Palestinian territories:

- Israeli permit regime in the West Bank
- Israeli permit regime in the Gaza Strip
