= Izon =

Izon may refer to:

== People ==
- Charles Izon (1872–1897), English football player
- David Izon, also known as David Izonritei, heavyweight silver medallist
- Dennis Izon (1907–1967), English football player
- Noel Izon, Filipino filmmaker

== Places ==
- Izon, Gironde, France
- Izon-la-Bruisse, Drôme, France

== Other ==
- Izon or Ijaw people
- Izon language
- Izon, fictional organisation in Cube 2: Hypercube
- Izon Science
