= Temple Emil =

Former synagogue in Manila, Philippines

Religion
- Affiliation: Judaism (former)
- Ecclesiastical or organizational status: Synagogue (1924–1945)
- Year consecrated: 1924
- Status: Destroyed

Location
- Location: Taft Avenue, Metro Manila
- Country: The Philippines

Architecture
- Type: Synagogue architecture
- Style: Moorish Revival
- Funded by: Emil Bachrach
- Completed: 1924
- Destroyed: 1945 (Battle of Manila)

The Temple Emil was a former Jewish congregation and synagogue, located on Taft Avenue, in Metro Manila, the Philippines. The synagogue was destroyed in 1945, during the Battle of Manila in World War II.

== History ==
The first Jews known to have settled in the Philippines were Spanish Jews, during the 1600s, with further wave of settlement during the 1870s, from Alsace. Following World War I, Russian Jews settled, to escape discrimination in Russia.

Consecrated in 1924 and completed in the Moorish Revival style, it was the first synagogue in the Philippines. Its construction was funded by the family of Emil Bachrach, an American Jew, at a time when the Philippines was technically an insular territory of the United States. During the 1930s and 1940s, thousands of European Jews emigrated to the Philippines.

The synagogue was destroyed in World War II during the 1945 Battle of Manila which led to the end of the Japanese occupation. It was the only synagogue on territory of the United States that was destroyed during World War II.

The Beth Yaacov Synagogue was built in 1982 to replace Temple Emil at another site in Makati.

== See also ==
- History of the Jews in the Philippines
- List of synagogues in the Philippines
