= Israeli permit regime in the Gaza Strip =

Regime imposed on Palestinians 1967–2005

The Israeli permit regime in the Gaza Strip is the legal regime that requires Palestinians in the Gaza Strip to obtain a number of separate permits from the military authorities of Israel, their occupiers from 1967 to 2005.

Israeli work permits allow pass holders to work in Israel or its occupied territories where wages are significantly higher than in Gaza, which has been under a blockade by Israel and Egypt since Islamist militant group Hamas has gained power in the region.

Israeli authorities, including the Ministry of Defense, view the scheme as a means of keeping peaceful relations; critics view the scheme as a form of coercive control. Israel also operates a similar permit regime in the West Bank. The Associated Press notes that this is used for leverage by Israel, who know that the violent actions of Hamas are going to be blamed for Gazans losing their work permits.

== History ==
When Hamas seized power of the Gaza Strip in 2007, 120,000 Gazans who worked inside Israel had their passes revoked. In recent years, Israel has allowed thousands of Gaza Palestinians to work within its borders. In 2021, 7,000 Gazans held Israeli work or trade permits. In 2022, the permit quota was raised to 17,000, with a planned increase to 20,000. The wages earned in Israel are significantly higher than what’s available within Gaza. For example, one permit holder mentioned that one month of work in Israel equals three years of work in Gaza. In September 2023, approximately 18,000 Gazans had Israeli work permits, which provided a cash injection of $2 million a day to Gaza's economy.

Following the October 7 attacks and subsequent Gaza war, Gazans in Israel on work permits were unable to return to Gaza after they were revoked by Israeli authorities. Some were detained by the Israel Defense Force (IDF) or other Israeli authorities in the West Bank while others were deported to that territory.

== See also ==
- Israeli permit regime in the West Bank
- Palestinian workers in Israel
- Filipinos in Israel
- Indians in Israel
- Palestinian freedom of movement
