= Beit Yaacov Synagogue, Makati =

Synagogue in Manila, Philippines

Beth Yaacov Synagogue
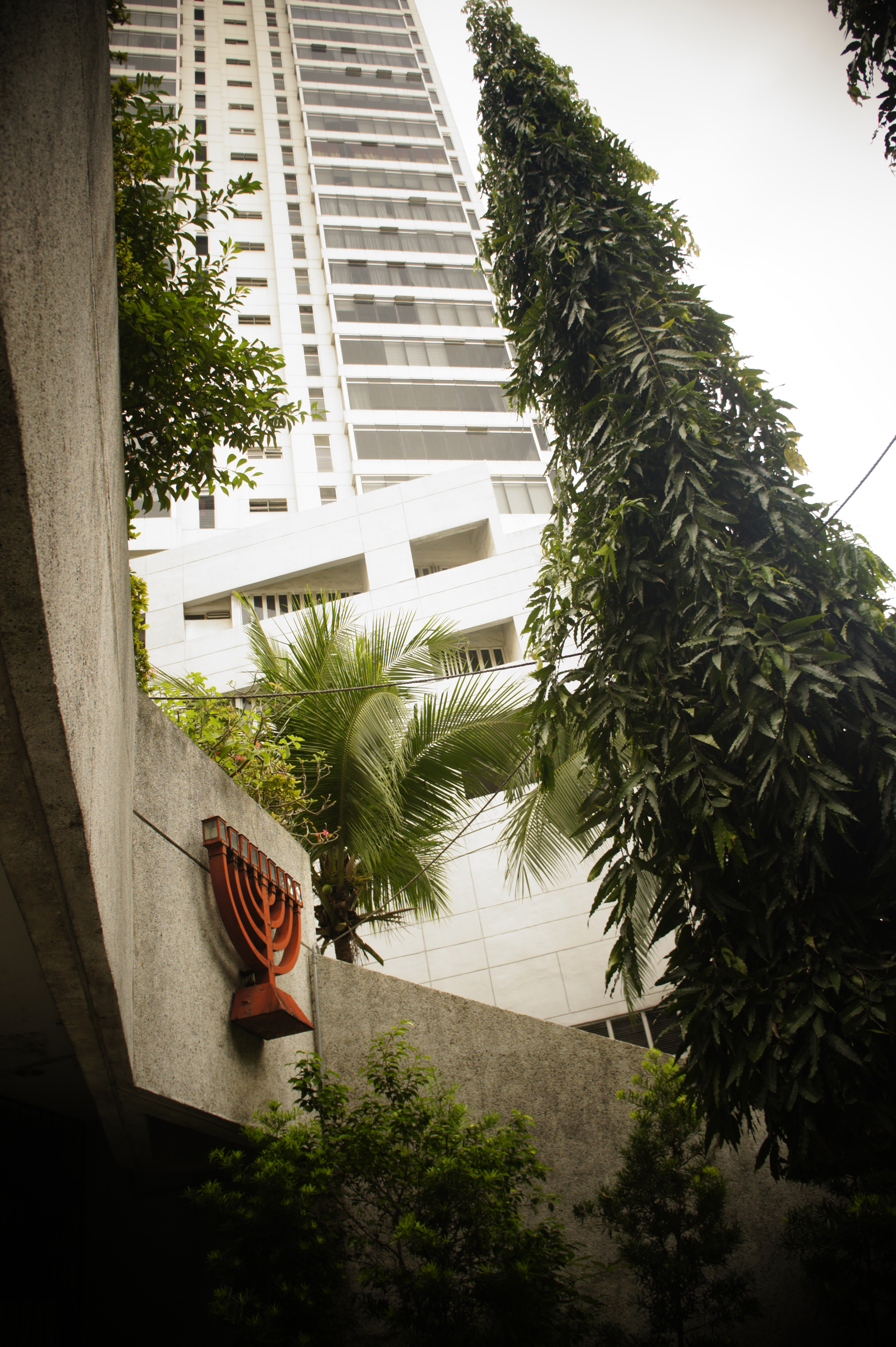
- The synagogue in 2012

- Location of the synagogue in Metro Manila

Religion
- Affiliation: Judaism
- Rite: Nusach Aram Soba
- Ecclesiastical or organisational status: Synagogue
- Ownership: Jewish Association of the Philippines
- Leadership: Rabbi Refael Mimran
- Status: Active

Location
- Location: Makati, Metro Manila
- Country: Philippines
- Coordinates: 14°33′40″N 121°01′28″E

Architecture
- Established: 1982 (as a congregation)
- Completed: 1982

The Beit Yaacov Synagogue is a synagogue, located in Makati, in Metro Manila, Philippines.

The rabbi, as of October 2024, was Refael Mimran.

== History ==
The synagogue replaced Temple Emil, destroyed in 1945. After World War II, the congregation re-established itself at the Taft Avenue location. With the help of prominent Jewish families in the Philippines and the US Army, the synagogue was rebuilt and renamed as Beit Yaakov. In 1982, the synagogue was moved from Taft Avenue to its current location in Makati. The congregation is administered by the Jewish Association of the Philippines and worships in the Sephardic rite.

The synagogue offers Bnei mitzvot classes for children, along with classes for children who wish to learn Hebrew and Torah.

It is one of two synagogues in Metro Manila, including a Chabad synagogue.

The current complex serves as the headquarters of the Jewish Association of the Philippines. Its social hall, Bachrach Hall, is named in honor of Emil Bachrach (benefactor of the original Temple Emil), and the complex houses two fully equipped kosher kitchens alongside the largest Jewish library in Southeast Asia.

== Gallery ==
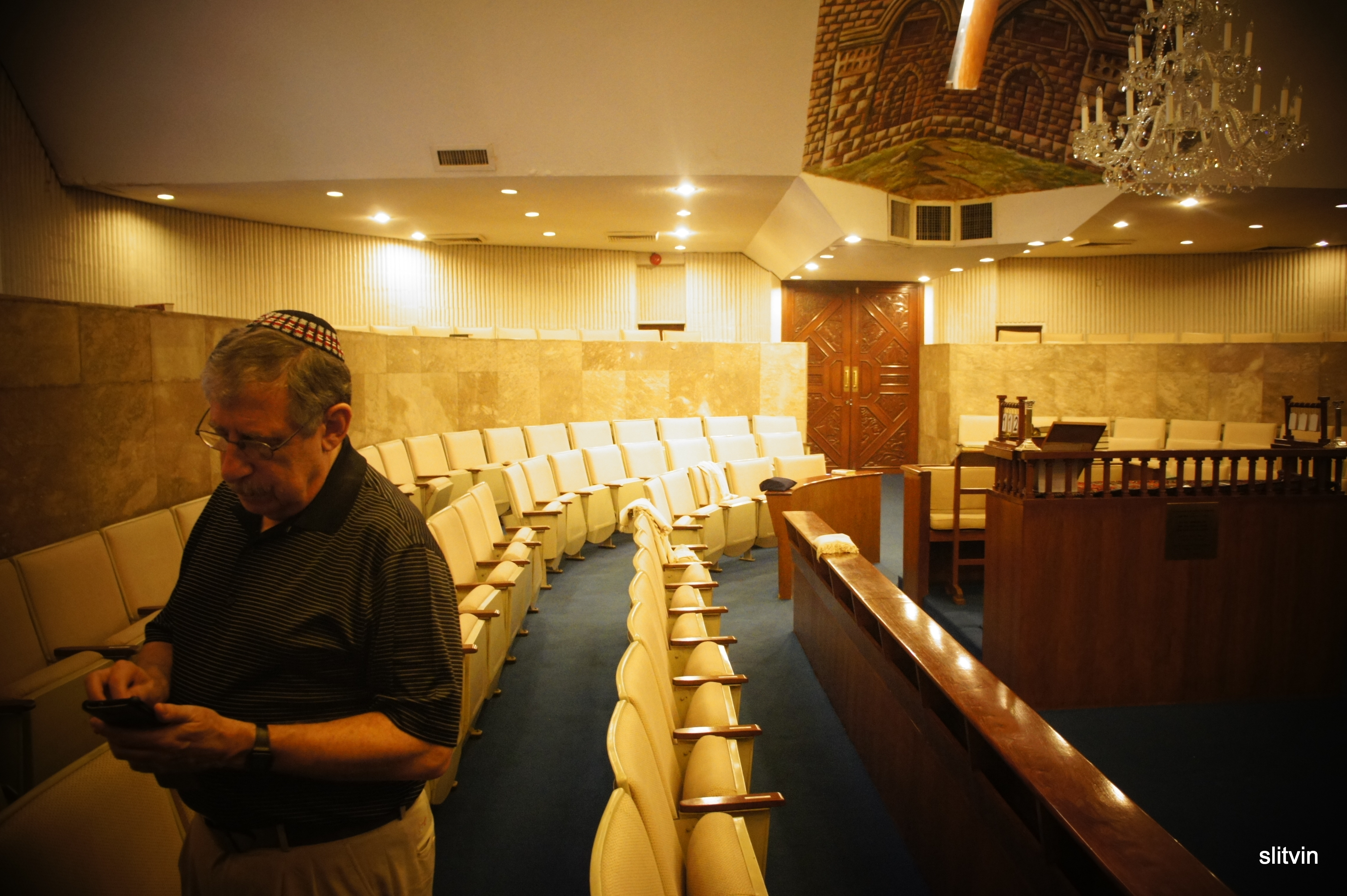
Interior of the synagogue

== See also ==
- History of the Jews in the Philippines
- List of synagogues in the Philippines
