= Moshe Raviv =

Israeli diplomat (born 1935)

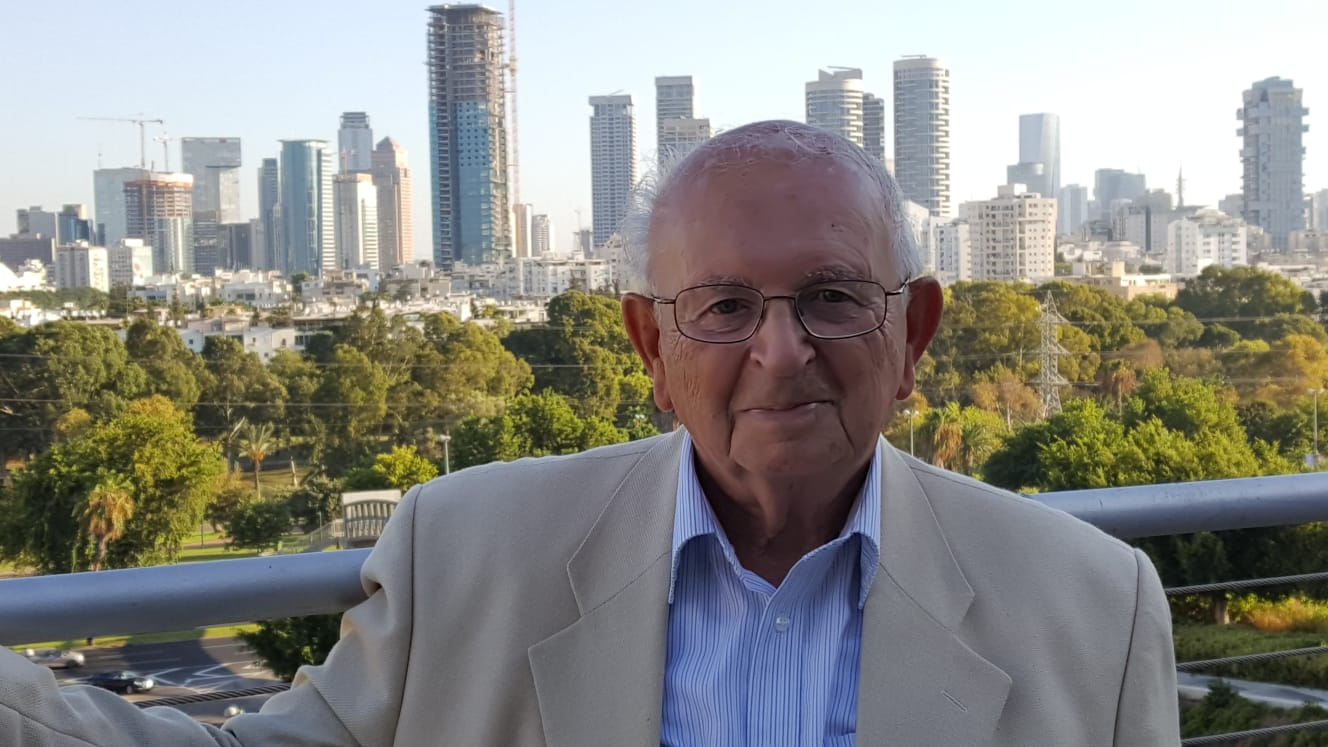
Moshe Raviv

Moshe Raviv (Hebrew: משה רביב; born 1935) was an Israeli ambassador to the United Kingdom (1993–1998), and the Philippines (1978–1981). During the Six-Day War, he was an aide to Israeli foreign minister Abba Eban.

While Ambassador to the UK, there were two car bomb attacks on 26 July 1994 aimed at Jewish targets. One exploded at the Israeli embassy, injuring 14 people. Samar Alami and Jawad Botmeh were convicted of conspiracy to cause explosions. Jeremy Corbyn called for Alami and Botmeh to be freed. Raviv spoke out against Corbyn, condemning his support for the pair.
