= Palestinian workers in Israel =

Palestinian workers in Israel (Hebrew: עובדים פלסטינים) are Palestinian citizens of the Palestinian Authority who are employed by Israeli citizens in the State of Israel and Israeli settlements in the West Bank. Most of them work as unskilled laborers in sectors such as agriculture and construction.

== Work permits available for Palestinian workers ==
According to January 1, 2015 Administration of Border Crossings, Population and Immigration report, there are 55,200 jobs that are dedicated to Palestinian workers. The permits are divided to sectors:

Sector	Job permits
Normal agriculture	5,000
Groves and plantation	4,250
Olives	3,000
Strawberries	700
Persimmon	0
Cucumber	0
Service in manufacturing	2,250
Service in healthcare	250
Service in construction	400
Service in hoteliery	300
Construction	37,100
Other	2,000
Total	55,250

In 2022, the number of work permits from Gaza was raised to 17,000 with plans to further hike the number to 20,000. As of 2023, 150,000 Palestinians work in Israel.

== History ==
=== Post Six-Day War ===
Immediately after the Six-Day War the Palestinian community in the West Bank and the Gaza Strip suffered a major economic crisis, due to the disconnection from the ruling country, Jordan and Egypt respectively, which was the main destination of agricultural exports and paid wages for civil workers (such as teachers and official clerks). Quickly, the Israeli administration opened new significant work opportunities for the Palestinian community, which started being an important part of the Israeli economy, mainly as workers in jobs such as agriculture, construction and cleaning. Soon the Palestinian workers started replacing unskilled Israelis from these sectors who were employed before 1967. The abundant number of low wage Palestinian workers in different sectors caused a general drop in the average wage in these specific sectors and a drop in workforce productivity due to the wide supply of cheap manual labor.

Initially, the Palestinian workers were employed illegally, and since the summer of 1968, in an official permission, the number of workers gradually increased (several thousands before 1970, around 20,000 in 1970, 50,000 in 1972 and 75,000 in 1982). According to estimates, a third of the Palestinian workforce were employed in Israel at that time. Along with workers who held permits, an unknown number of illegal workers were also employed. Palestinian workers were often exposed to exploitation by their employees because of the abundance of available workers and the illegal workers, and because they are an unskilled workforce.

=== Post First Intifada ===
In the late 1980s and the 1990s, tension between Israel and Palestine built up to the First Intifada. This resulted in the large scale banning of Palestinian workers from entering Israel, and in Israeli employers hiring Eastern European and Asian cheap laborers to replace them.

=== Post 2008 ===
In 2011, the Palestinian Authority (PA) claimed it would take actions to limit the number of Palestinians who are employed in Israel and in settlements. Shaher Saad, the Secretary General of the Palestinian workers association said that such action can't be done because the PA doesn't provide any alternative. He stated that 35,000 Palestinian workers are employed within Israel and in the settlements which provide the local economy with 2 billion dollars budget every year.

In 2013, Haaretz reported that 48,000 Palestinians are legally employed in Israel and Israeli settlements, the highest number since the outbreak of the Second Intifada. It also states that according to evaluations, up to 30,000 worked illegally without a work permit.

=== Post October 7, 2023 ===
In 2024, the Shin Bet, Israel's internal security service, published an investigative report concluding that Palestinian workers in Israel did not systematically spy for Hamas in the lead-up to 2023 Hamas-led attack on Israel.

== See also ==
- Filipinos in Israel
- Indians in Israel
- Arab citizens of Israel
- Agriculture in Israel
