= List of ambassadors of Israel to the Philippines =

Ambassador of the State of Israel to the Republic of the Philippines Sugo ng Estado ng Israel sa Republika ng Pilipinas
- שגריר ישראל בפיליפינים
- Coat of Arms of Israel
- Incumbent; Dana Kursh since August 19, 2025
- Ministry of Foreign Affairs; Embassy of Israel, Manila
- Reports to: Ministry of Foreign Affairs
- Seat: Taguig City, Metro Manila, Philippines
- Nominator: Prime Minister of Israel
- Inaugural holder: Jacob Shimoni
- Formation: 1957
- Website: Embassy website

The Ambassador from Israel to the Philippines is Israel's foremost diplomatic representative in the Philippines.

== List of ambassadors ==
- 1957: Minister Jacob Shimoni (Non-Resident)
- 1957–1960: Minister Daniel Lewin (diplomat) (Non-Resident, Naypyitaw)
- 1960–1963: Minister Yehiel Ilsar
- 1963–1965: Ambassador Shmuel Shelef
- 1965–1968: Avraham Kidron
- 1968–1972: Yaacov Avnon
- 1972–1976: Daniel Laor
- 1976–1978: Shlomo Seruya
- 1978–1981: Moshe Raviv
- 1981–1983: Jacob Aviad
- 1983–1986: Uri Gordon
- 1986–1988: Meir Gavish
- 1988–1992: Yoav Behiri
- 1992–1997: Amos Shetibel
- 1997–2000: Ilan Baruch
- 2000–2004: Irit Ben-Abba
- 2004–2007: Yehosua Sagi
- 2007–2011: Zvi Aviner-Vapni
- 2011–2014: Menashe Bar-On
- 2014–2018: Ephraim Ben-Matityahu
- 2018–2021: Rafael Harpaz
- 2021–2025: Ilan Fluss
- 2025-present: Dana Kursh
