= History of the Jews in the Philippines =

The history of the Jews in the Philippines started during the Spanish period (1565–1898).

== Spanish era ==
The Spanish Inquisition in the 16th century forced many Jews in Spain to convert to Christianity or to flee. These Jewish "New Christians" were known as "marranos" or "conversos", a term which included converted Muslims. Sephardi Jews are those Jews coming from the Iberian Peninsula and settled in the Philippines, particularly, in Northern Samar. Some, called Crypto-Jews, observed their Jewish rites in secret. The Inquisition investigated and persecuted many of the Conversos, accusing them of practicing in secret, some without substantial basis. Thus many of the original Jews and Marranos fled to the new Spanish colonies including the Philippines. Two "New Christian" brothers, Jorge and Domingo Rodríguez, arrived in the Spanish Philippines in the 1590s. By 1593 both were tried and convicted at an auto-da-fé in Mexico City because the Inquisition did not have an independent tribunal in the Philippines. The Inquisition imprisoned the Rodríguez brothers and subsequently tried and convicted at least eight other "New Christians" from the Philippines. Such was the precarious status of Jewish settlers in the Philippines. Jewish presence during the subsequent centuries of Spanish colonization remained small and unorganized. Spanish Christianized laws would not have permitted the presence of an organized Jewish community.

The first permanent settlement of Jews in the Philippines during the Spanish colonial years began with the arrival of three Levy brothers from Alsace-Lorraine, who were escaping the aftermath of the Franco-Prussian War in 1870. As entrepreneurs, their business ventures over the years included jewelry retail, a general merchandising business, and import trade in gems, pharmaceuticals, and eventually automobiles. Along with them was another notable Jew from the Alsace region, Leopold Kahn, who became president and general manager of La Estrella del Norte and Levy Hermanos, Inc. Kahn also held positions such as the French consul-general to the Philippines, and president of the French Chamber of Commerce. The opening of the Suez Canal in March 1869 provided a more direct trading route between Europe and the Philippines, allowing businesses to grow and the number of Jews in the Philippines to increase. The Levy brothers were subsequently joined by Turkish, Syrian, and Egyptian Jews, creating a multi-ethnic Jewish population of about fifty individuals by the end of the Spanish period. It was not until the Spanish–American War at the end of the 19th century, when the United States took control of the islands from Spain in 1898, that the Jewish community was allowed to officially organize and openly practice Judaism.

== American era ==
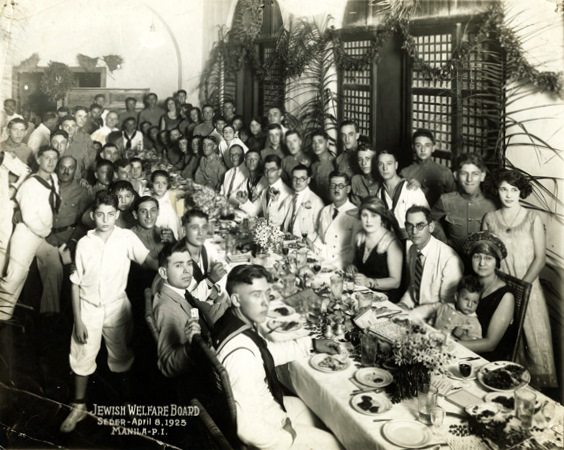
Jewish community in Manila during a Passover Seder celebration, 1925

When the Philippines became an American colony, American Jewish citizens took advantage of this new frontier. The arrival of American military forces to the Philippines brought Jewish servicemen who decided to remain in the islands after their military discharge and become permanent residents. Jewish teachers from the United States also arrived with a contingent of "Thomasites," a delegation of volunteer teachers, who gave public instruction to Filipino children. In addition to education, new markets for import-export businesses attracted young Jewish businessmen, who set up new shops in the Philippines or extended businesses from the U.S. mainland.

Three important names appear in the Jewish community around the start of the 20th century: Emil Bachrach and Morton I. Netzorg. Emil Bachrach arrived in Manila in 1901 and soon built a sizable commercial empire. Because he is regarded as the first American Jew who permanently settled in the Philippines, the synagogue and cultural hall, which the Bachrach family financed in subsequent decades, bore his name: Temple Emil and Bachrach Hall. Joseph Cysner became the caretaker of the Temple. Bachrach's economic successes allowed him to be a generous philanthropist, who supported both Jewish and Christian causes. Economic prosperity, along with a high level of societal interaction, apparently precluded the need for strong Jewish institutions. Theirs was a 19th-century lifestyle of the very rich. Although the Jewish families did go to the Temple for special occasions, and the existence of an adjacent social hall did serve to centralize and focus Jewish cultural life, it was still very low-key. Even though Temple Emil was built in the 1920s primarily through the generous contributions of the Bachrachs, Netzorgs, and Frieders, the only services conducted on an annual basis were the High Holidays, when a visiting Rabbi or Cantor from Shanghai officiated the services. By 1936, the Jewish community in the Philippines had a distinctly cosmopolitan makeup with a total population of about 500 persons. The threat to European Jewry by the Nazi government in the 1930s sparked a renewed Jewish consciousness. The small, decentralized and secular-minded Jewish community of Manila took steps to save fellow Jews from certain death, only becoming Jewish-conscious in a deep way when the Nazi threat came out of Europe, and there were thousands of Jews in desperate need of help.

It was during the era of the Philippine Commonwealth (1935–1946) that Jewish refugees from Europe sought a safe haven in Manila. The migration of Jews escaping Europe between 1935 and 1941 was the last major immigration of Jews to the Philippines. The first German Jews to arrive in Manila actually came from the Jewish community in Shanghai. With the occupation of Peking by the Japanese in 1937, the four million inhabitants of Shanghai were endangered. Germany's shift of alliance from China to Japan at this time alarmed German Jews in Shanghai, fearing German pressure on Japan to adopt Nazi anti-Jewish policies. Fearing for them as well, the Jewish community in Manila, led by the Frieder Brothers of Cincinnati, organized the Jewish Refugee Committee of Manila (JRC) with the intention of rescuing German members of the Shanghai Jewish community. These Jews had already been deprived of their German citizenship, and the Gestapo presence that was taking root in Japanese areas threatened Jewish existence in Shanghai as well. When the Second Sino-Japanese War broke out in 1937, the JRC received a telegram from Shanghai asking for assistance for Shanghai's refugee Jews. With the help of Ho Feng-Shan, the Chinese Consul-General in Austria, Austrian Jews were able to escape to other countries, including the Philippines, when Adolf Hitler annexed Austria to Germany in 1938. Manila then received 30 German Jewish refugee families from Shanghai, which then started a larger program that would eventually rescue 1,300 refugee Jews from Europe between 1937 and 1941, the largest influx of Jews in Philippine history.

The mechanics of the refugee rescue plan in Manila involved many different people and agencies in the Philippines, the United States, and in Germany. The refugee rescue plan also had some opponents. In 1938, Emilio Aguinaldo was quoted to hold antisemitic beliefs in his opposition to Quezon's plan to shelter Jews in the Philippines. While it was important to have the cooperation and consent of President Quezon in this refugee rescue plan, all issues of Philippine foreign affairs were still totally in the hands of the U.S. State Department and would be until the Philippines was granted independence in 1946. What is unique to the rescue of refugee Jews in the Philippines is that the Jewish community in Manila was granted authority by High Commissioner Paul McNutt and Philippine President Quezon to operate a selection committee to choose those who would be granted visas by the U.S. State Department. By an application and review process, Jewish refugees in Germany and Austria obtained visas for immigration from U.S. consular officers who had been instructed by the U.S. State Department to issue visas based on recommendations from the JRC in Manila. This successful Frieder-McNutt selection rescue plan led to the larger resettlement rescue plan that focused on the island of Mindanao as a destination for the mass resettlement of 10,000 refugee Jews. For the refugees who did manage to settle in the Philippines, the JRC organised committees to aid in finding employment and new homes for them in Manila. Though relatively modest in numbers when compared to the number of refugees worldwide, the newly arrived refugees nearly overwhelmed the small Jewish community of Manila, multiplying its numbers relatively overnight. An ironic turn of events occurred when all rescue plans halted with the invasion and occupation of the Philippines during WWII.

== Japanese invasion ==
Before the attack on Pearl Harbor, more than 1,300 Jews from Europe had immigrated to the Philippines. The Jewish community of Manila reached its maximum population of about 2,500 members by the end of 1941, having increased eightfold since it first received refugees in 1937. This once American-dominated Jewish community that had saved the lives of well over 1,300 European Jews from probable extermination in the Holocaust, faced an unexpected persecution of its own. An amazing turn of events put the fate of the American Jews into the hands of the German refugee Jews when the Japanese entered Manila in December 1941 and summarily interned all "enemy alien" civilians in University of Santo Tomas Internment Camp (STIC), and later at the Los Baños Internment Camp and the old Bilibid prison in Manila.

The Japanese did not perceive a difference between German nationals and German Jews so the majority of the Jewish community in Manila, hundreds of German and Austrian Jews, did not face internment at Santo Tomas University. However, about 250 other members of the Jewish community, including the more influential American members, were immediately incarcerated, as well as Americans of other faiths and "enemy alien" civilians. Having spent five years freeing hundreds of German Jews from Nazi oppression, the Manila American Jewish community now faced its own incarceration. Their fate was now in the hands of the German refugee Jews who aided their interned benefactors with food and supplies. Several firsthand accounts about the details of camp life have been written over the years, but few of them discuss specifics concerning the experiences of the Jews in camp. It can only be assumed that the general state of affairs at the camp pertained to all. The Japanese left the camp members to their own designs to solve their housing, food, and sanitation problems. Most prisoners were interned for the full three years until the end of the war in 1945.

While inmates at STIC battled malnutrition, disease, and exposure, residents of Manila tried to adapt to life under Japanese occupation. Houses and businesses were searched and seized without warning, providing lodging for the Japanese forces while making their owners jobless and homeless. Japanese penalties for violations of imposed civilian restrictions were both swift and brutal, administered through beatings, hangings, imprisonment, starvation, torture, and executions. In January 1943, antisemitic propaganda targeted the non-interned German Jews, as Japanese leaders began to be influenced by their Nazi allies. Rumors about forcing the German Jews into a ghetto began to circulate. This imminent danger to the German Jews was averted by the more influential leaders of the Jewish community, who negotiated with the Japanese leaders. While the Japanese could not be bothered by Nazi plans to establish a Jewish ghetto in the Philippines, they did not object to episodes of abuse randomly waged against members of the Jewish community by their own soldiers. The Japanese also used the synagogue and its adjacent hall to store ammunition, and they were totally destroyed in the war. Dozens of incidents of German Jews, along with other civilians suffering at the hands of the Japanese during these years of occupation, illustrate the horror of the time.

== Recognition of independence up to the present ==
After the liberation of the Philippines from Japanese occupation by the U.S. and Philippine Commonwealth Armed Forces, the freed internees of STIC joined with the remaining refugees in Manila to try to rebuild their devastated community. Temple Emil and Bachrach Hall had been totally destroyed. All had been victimized by the Japanese occupying forces, which resulted in the death of 70 members of the Jewish community. The American military took steps to assist the Jewish community in its recovery. U.S. and Filipino soldiers provided not only food, water, supplies, and medicine for the victims, but also donated $15,000 for the rebuilding of the synagogue.

But the destruction was so widespread that nearly all of the refugees and their American and British benefactors left the Philippines and the community membership had decreased by 30% by the end of 1946. Fewer than 250 European Jewish refugees could be counted among the estimated 600 Jews who remained in the Philippines by the end of 1948. By 1954, the Jewish community of Manila counted a total of 302 members. By rescuing over 1,300 Jewish refugees, this American Commonwealth saved them from the fate of the six million Jews who were murdered in the Holocaust.

In 1947, the Philippines voted in favour of the United Nations partition plan for Palestine; political scientist Benyamin Neuberger describes it as the only Asian country to support partition.

As of 2005, Jews in the Philippines numbered at the most 500 people. Other estimates range between 100 and 18,500 people (0.000001% and 0.005% of the country's total population).

As of 2011, Metro Manila has the largest Jewish community in the Philippines, which consists of roughly seventy families. The country's only synagogue, Beth Yaacov, is located in Makati, as is the Chabad House. There are, of course, other Jews elsewhere in the country, like the Bagelboys of Subic and Angeles City and Siargao Island but these are obviously fewer and almost all transients, either diplomats or business envoys, and their existence is almost totally unknown in mainstream society. There are a few Israelis in Manila working at call centers and a few other executives. There are also a number of converts to Judaism. Globally, predominantly in the Western world, Filipinos and Jews have intermixed, with hundreds of thousands of mixed Filipino-Jewish individuals existing in the modern era.

== See also ==
- Eastern Sephardim
- List of Asian Jews
- Israel–Philippines relations
