= Emil Bachrach =

American businessman in the Philippines (1874–1937)

- Born: Emanuel Maurice Bachrach; July 4, 1874; Mogilev, Russian Empire (now Belarus)
- Died: September 28, 1937; Commonwealth of the Philippines
- Occupations: Entrepreneur and philanthropist
- Spouse: Mary McDonald
- Children: Niece-Minna Levine-Gaberman

Emanuel Maurice "Emil" Bachrach (4 July 1874 – 28 September 1937) was a Belarusian-Jewish emigrant to the United States who became an entrepreneur and philanthropist in the Philippines.

== Career ==
Emil arrived in the United States from Belarus (then in the Russian Empire), at the age of 18. Soon after, in 1901, he moved to Manila with around $850 and started a furniture company. Later Emil secured a franchise from Ford Motor Company and started Bachrach Motors Inc, and later still, the Philippine Air Taxi Co (PATCO) in 1930. PATCO was bought by Andrés Soriano in 1939 and two years later merged into Philippine Airlines (PAL), which inherited its license to operate as an airliner. Emil Bachrach was a philanthropist, who supported both Jewish and Christian causes and accommodated Jews fleeing from Nazi Germany. He was a major contributor to the building of the Jewish Temple Emil Synagogue.

Bachrach met Mary McDonald in 1916, who was another American expatriate who owned and managed landmark hotels in Baguio, such as the Nevada Hotel and Pines Hotel, as well as Delmonico Hotel in Manila. After a short courtship the two married, and Mary not only became a loving wife to Bachrach, but also became an invaluable business partner. Emil and Mary were close to her sister Annie's daughter, Minna Levine. Minna's father was Hyman M. Levine. would later marry another influential White Russian immigrant Bernard Gaberman. They had two children Mari Gaberman and Earl "Butch" Gaberman.

Bachrach was also instrumental in the establishment of the Commonwealth's Bureau of Aeronautics which would be the precursor of the Civil Aviation Authority of the Philippines, as he was appointed by the Governor-General Dwight F. Davis as a member of a committee which studied the potential for civil aviation around the archipelago. The committee recommended the creation of the Bureau under the Department of Commerce and Industry, the adaption of United States air traffic regulations, and the establishment of airports and airfields around the country.

During World War II, the widow of Bachrach, Mary McDonald, had to surrender their residence Casa Blanca or also known as the Bachrach Mansion along Manga Ave., cor Buenos Aires St., in Santa Mesa, Manila, as it was commandeered by Gen. Tomoyuki Yamashita upon his assignment in the Philippines in October 1944. After the Battle of Manila Gen. Douglas MacArthur and his family took up residence in the said mansion. After the war, Mary Bachrach moved to the United States, and the mansion was acquired by Club Filipino and was inaugurated by President Ramon Magsaysay on September 21, 1956.

== Bibliography ==
- DFA in Tel-Aviv
- Philippine Embassy Article
