= Noel Izon =

American film director

Noel Izon (nickname Sonny) was born in the Philippines. He is a documentary filmmaker and resides in Maryland with his wife Kathryn Izon and daughter Juliet Izon. He also has an older daughter, Laura Izon, who is married and works as a lawyer in Sacramento, California.

Noel has won many national awards for his work, which include some 100 nationally televised programs done mainly for PBS and also for National Geographic Television. Most recently, his company, ICT, coordinated the visual program for Vice-President Dick Cheney’s inaugural salute to American veterans and created For Our Tomorrows—a video tribute to veterans for the event. Among his many documentary films are Everglades, In the Spirit of Stradivarius, Navaho Sandpainting, Singapore Street Opera, and Cameras on Move—all for National Geographic Television. He also was the producer of Pearls, the first PBS series on Asians in America. He has done numerous films and videos for the U.S. government, including several for the White House, and recently completed a video to teach Korean and other Asian immigrants about the U.S. justice system.

Noel spent ten years at PBS affiliate WNVT-Virginia and at the Educational Film Center as a writer/producer before forming his own production company, Interactive Communication Technology, in 1980. Sonny graduated with honors from the University of Maryland with a B.A. in English Literature.

His most famous work is An Untold Triumph, which tells the story of Filipino-American soldiers during World War II. The film won the audience award at the Hawaii International Film Festival in 2002.
