= Embassy of Israel, Manila =

Diplomatic mission of Israel in the Philippines

Embassy of the State of Israel, Manila שגרירות ישראל, מנילה
- Location: Taguig, Metro Manila
- Address: 1132 University Parkway North Fort Bonifacio, Taguig, Metro Manila
- Coordinates: 14°33′30.5″N 121°03′26.5″E
- Ambassador: Dana Kursh
- Jurisdiction: Philippines
- Website: new.embassies.gov.il/philippines

The Embassy of the State of Israel in the Philippines is the diplomatic mission of Israel to the Philippines. It is located at the Avecshares Center, 1132 University Parkway North, Bonifacio Global City in Taguig.The permanent mission of Israel in the Philippines has been representing the country since the year 1962.

The embassy began operating in Bonifacio Global City since March 2013.

The current ambassador of Israel to the Philippines as of 19 August 2025 is Dana Kursh.

== Development cooperation ==
Through MASHAV, Israel's international development agency, the embassy has supported training and technical-cooperation programs in the Philippines. The embassy states that around 3,000 Filipinos had participated in MASHAV courses in Israel, while Israeli experts had conducted on-site courses in the Philippines in fields such as water management, dairy farming and disaster-risk management. In 2025, the Philippine News Agency reported that MASHAV head Eynat Shlein visited the Philippines to expand development cooperation, including potential humanitarian and disaster-relief partnerships and agriculture-related capacity building.

== See also ==
- Israel-Philippines relations
