= Filipinos in Israel =

Ethnic group in Israel

Languages
- English, Hebrew, Tagalog, Cebuano, other languages of the Philippines

Religion
- Judaism, Christianity (predominantly Roman Catholicism), Islam (predominantly Sunni)

Related ethnic groups
- Filipino people, Overseas Filipinos

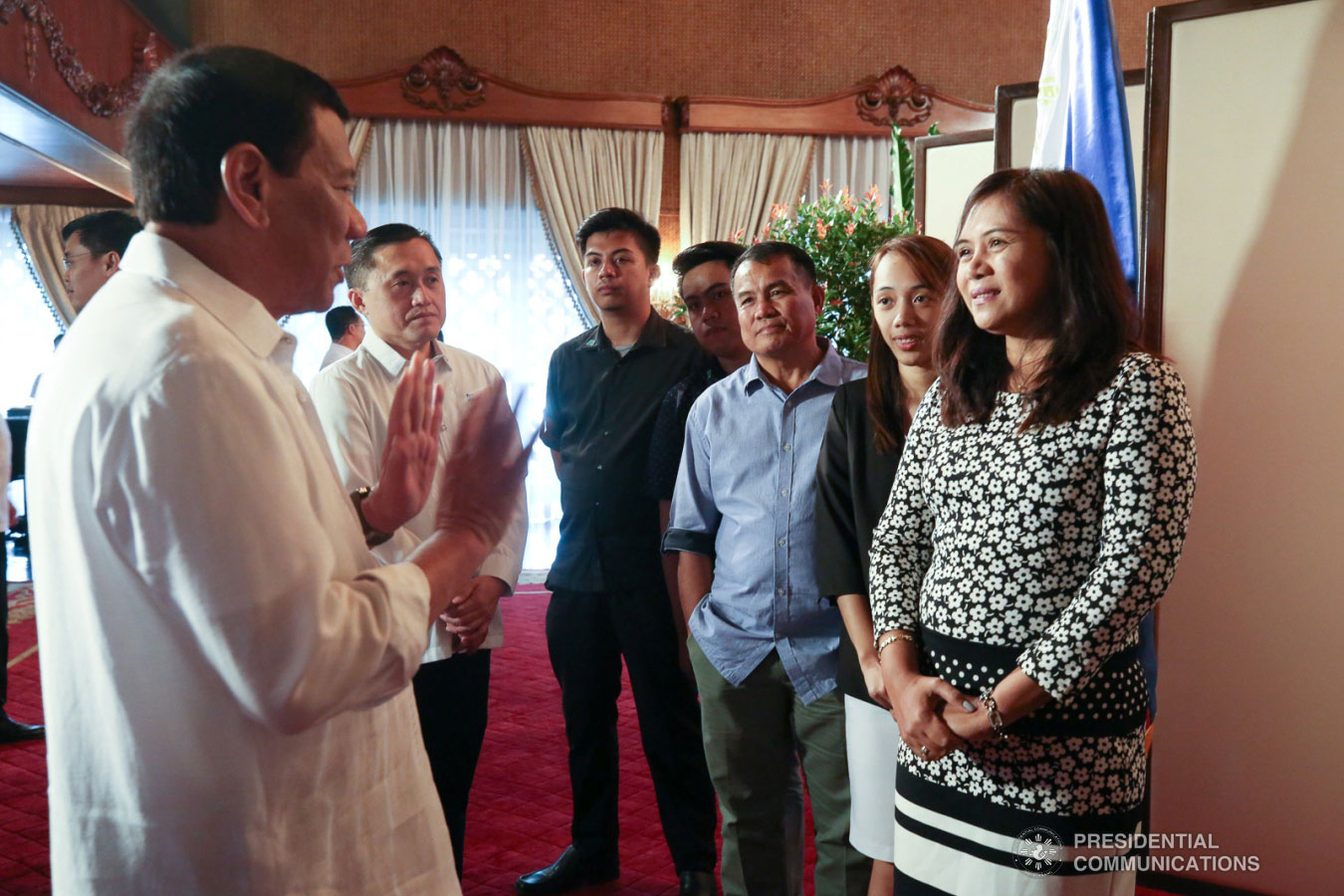
President Rodrigo Roa Duterte chats with Lispeth Francisco during a meeting at the Malacañan Palace on September 12, 2018. Francisco is the caregiver of the late Benzion Netanyahu, father of the State of Israel Prime Minister Benjamin Netanyahu.

Filipinos in Israel constitute one of the largest groups of immigrant workers in Israel. Israel is home to a population of almost 300,000 foreign workers, of whom 30,000 to 50,000 are Filipinos.

== Demographics ==
Reliable figures regarding the number of Filipinos in Israel are hard to know as beyond those who are legally in Israel with government-issued work permits, there are many who are in the country without official visas. The Philippine Embassy in Israel estimates that there are approximately 31,000 Filipinos legally working and living in Israel. Most of them live and work in Israel's largest cities, Tel Aviv, Jerusalem and Haifa. There is also a number of Filipinos working in Beersheba, Netanya, Rehovot and Rishon LeZion, but live in Tel Aviv, where they normally spend their weekends.

Plans to attempt to deport large numbers of Filipinos and other immigrant workers from Israel who are in the country undocumented have caused concern among the Filipino community. Many children of Filipino workers were born in Israel, and face deportation. In 2006, about 900 Filipino children were granted permanent residency in Israel, with that status to be extended to their parents and other family members once the children completed their military service.

During the 2023 Hamas-led attack on Israel, the Philippine Department of Foreign Affairs confirmed that four Filipinos had been killed in Israel. The fourth fatality was reported to be a Filipina caregiver working in a communal settlement when the attack began on October 7, 2023.

== Employment ==
Filipinos primarily work as live-in caregivers for elderly people. Recruitment in the caregiving sector has been affected by illegal placement fees charged by manpower agencies. In 2018, Israel and the Philippines reached a bilateral agreement to allow direct recruitment and reduce recruitment fees, which was implemented in 2021. However, many caregivers said that agencies continue to charge thousands of dollars to secure employment.

== Notable people ==
- Rose Fostanes, Winner of The X Factor Israel (season 1)

== See also ==
- Israel–Philippines relations
- Ethnic groups in Israel
- Filipino diaspora
