= Dana Kursh =

Israeli Diplomat

- דנה קורש

Consul General of Israel in Bangalore
- In office 2017–2020
- Succeeded by: Jonathan Zadka

Deputy Ambassador of Israel to India
- In office June 2015 – July 2017

Personal details
- Born: Merhavia, Israel
- Education: Hebrew University of Jerusalem (BA, MA)

Dana Kursh (Hebrew: דנה קורש) is an Israeli diplomat who has served as the Ambassador of Israel to the Philippines since August 1, 2025. She was previously dean of the Israel Academy for Diplomacy within the Israeli Ministry of Foreign Affairs from 2022 through 2025. Kursh was also head of the administration for the Agricultural Internship Program within the ministry. She had built the administration from scratch.

Her last post abroad was as Consul General of Israel in Bangalore with consular jurisdiction over Karnataka, Tamil Nadu, Kerala and Puducherry. She served from August 2017 until 2020. She had previously served from June 2015 to July 2017 as Deputy Ambassador of Israel to India in New Delhi.

Kursh was born and raised in Moshav Merhavia. Kursh's grandmother was murdered in the Holocaust. (One account says her grandmother had a lifelong scar on a forehead after a bullet meant to kill her missed.) She earned a BA in international relations from Hebrew University of Jerusalem and an MA in public policy (the Executive program of the Hebrew University of Jerusalem).
