= List of ambassadors of Israel to Myanmar =

== List of ambassadors ==
- Minister David Hacohen 1953 - 1955
- Minister Yaacov Shimoni 1955 - 1957
- Daniel Lewin 1957 - 1960
- Eliashiv Ben-Horin 1960 - 1963
- Mesholam Veron 1964 - 1968
- Zvi Brosh 1968 - 1970
- Arieh Eilan 1970 - 1973
- David Marmor 1973 - 1977
- Shmuel Ovnat 1977 - 1979
- Kalman Anner 1979 - 1983
- Ori Noy 1990 - 1993
- Mordechai Carni 1993 - 1996
- Gad Nathan 1996 - 2000
- Baruch Ram 2000 - 2001
- Yaacov Avrahamy 2002 - 2004
- Ruth Schatz 2004 - 2008
- Yaron Mayer 2008 - 2012
- Hagay-Moshe Behar 2012 - 2014
- Daniel Zohar-Zonshine 2014 - 2018
- Ronen Gil-Or 2018 - 2022
- Dov Segev-Steinberg 2022-present

== See also ==
- Israel–Myanmar relations
- Embassy of Israel, Yangon
