= Israel–Myanmar relations =

- Israel: Myanmar

Diplomatic mission
- Embassy of Israel in Yangon: Embassy of Myanmar in Tel Aviv

Envoy
- Ambassador Dov Segev-Steinberg: Ambassador Maung Maung Lynn

Israel–Myanmar relations (Hebrew: יחסי ישראל–מיאנמר; Burmese: အစ္စရေး-မြန်မာ ဆက်ဆံရေး) refers to the bilateral relations between Israel and Myanmar (formerly Burma), established in 1953. Myanmar was one of the first countries in Asia and the first country in Southeast Asia to recognise the State of Israel. Today, the countries cooperate in the fields of agriculture, health and education. Israel has an embassy in Yangon, and Myanmar has an embassy in Tel Aviv. Myanmar does not recognise the State of Palestine.

== History ==
=== Colonial era ===
Jewish merchants began arriving in Burma under British colonial rule in the 19th century where they were able to flourish in Burma's former capital of Rangoon, a city renowned as a center of ethnic and religious diversity. During this time, the Musmeah Yeshua Synagogue was built and remains as the last Jewish house of worship in Downtown Yangon, and Burma's only synagogue. During the Second World War the vast majority of Jews in the area fled after the Japanese invasion of Burma.

=== Post-colonial era ===
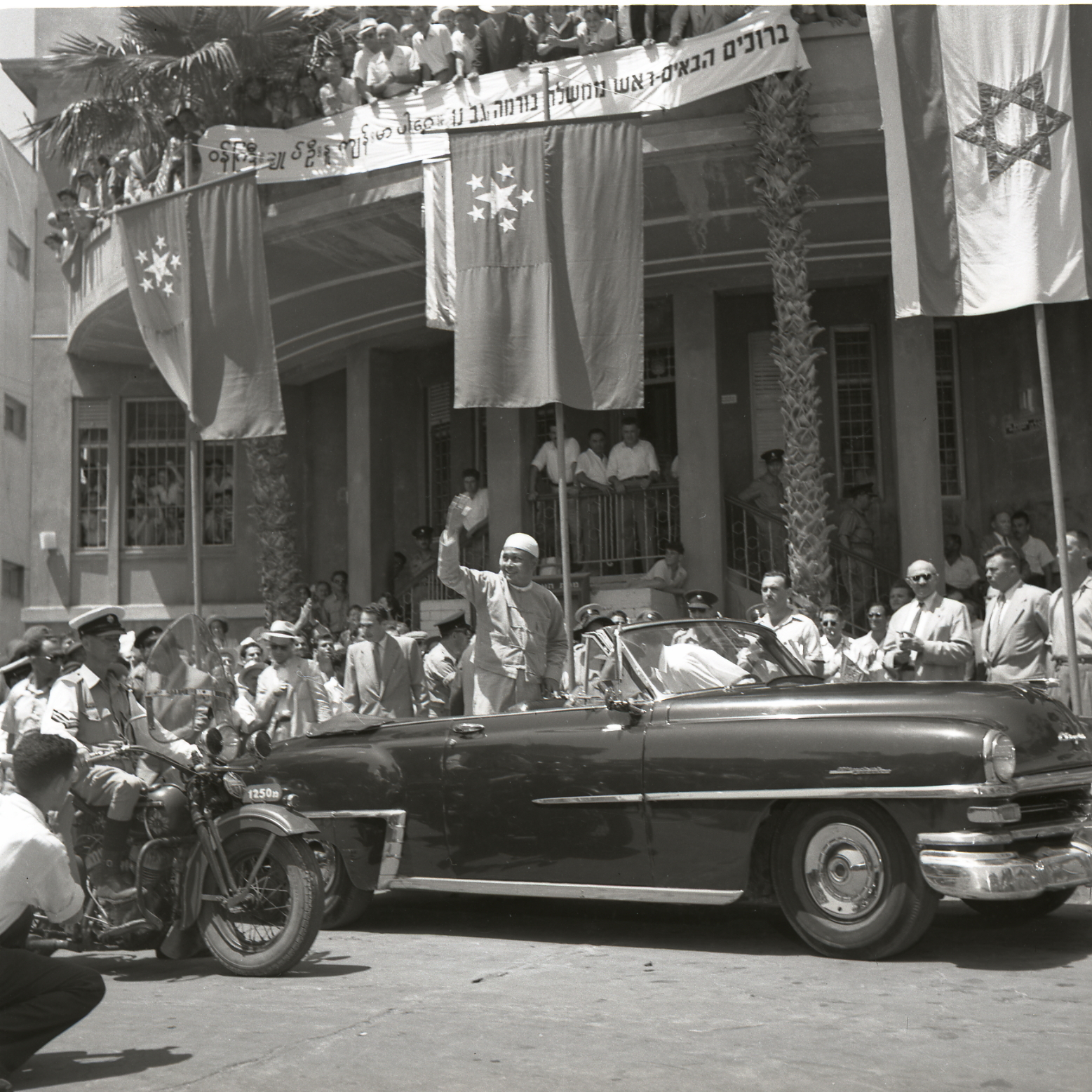
Burmese prime minister visiting Tel Aviv

Burma and Israel shared a number of similar characteristics, which some scholars believe was a motivating factor of their early establishment of relations. For example, both countries were nations that had gained independence from Britain in 1948 and had social democratic regimes initially led by charismatic figures like U Nu and David Ben-Gurion. Additionally, both countries were born into conflict, with Burma facing ethnic and communist insurgencies soon after independence, followed by the incursion of Chinese nationalist Kuomintang troops into Shan State while Israel faced the 1948 Arab-Israeli War when a military coalition of Arab states invaded the recently declared state of Israel.

=== Early relations ===
Close ties existed between the two countries as early as the 1950s. They were initiated by the Minister of Cooperation and general secretary of the Burma Socialist Party (BSP), Kyaw Nyein who led a high-level Burmese delegation to Israel in 1952. Kyaw Nyein considered Israel a kindred country with a social democratic party in power and was interested in its expertise in arms production and co-operative agriculture communities, Kibbutzim. Following the visit of Kyaw Nyein and responding to the latter's invitation, Israel's Foreign Minister Moshe Sharett visited Burma to attend the Asian Socialist Conference in Rangoon in 1953, and diplomatic relations were eventually established between the two countries with David Hacohen appointed first Israeli ambassador to Burma in December 1953. Kyaw Nyein's Israel initiatives led to a friendlier pro-Israel attitude by Burma's United Nations delegation and marked the beginning of mutual visits in military, economic and other fields. In May 1955, when U Nu, Burma's first Prime Minister since the country gained independence, travelled to Israel, it was the first visit of an Asian head of government to the Jewish state. Very sympathetic towards Israel, U Nu extended and deepened the diplomatic relations and cooperation between the two countries. During his visit, he toured several kibbutzim and later established several similar settlements in Shan State.

Various prominent Israeli figures visited Rangoon in the 1960s including Shimon Peres, Moshe Dayan, Yitzhak Ben-Zvi and Golda Meir. In 1961 the first Prime Minister of Israel, David Ben-Gurion, visited Burma. Intending to make a positive impression on the locals, he attended official functions wearing traditional Burmese dress including traditional headgear called gaung baung. During his trip, the Israeli Prime Minister studied Buddhism at a spiritual retreat at U Nu's residence, showing both his unique affinity for Buddhism and strong friendship with U Nu.

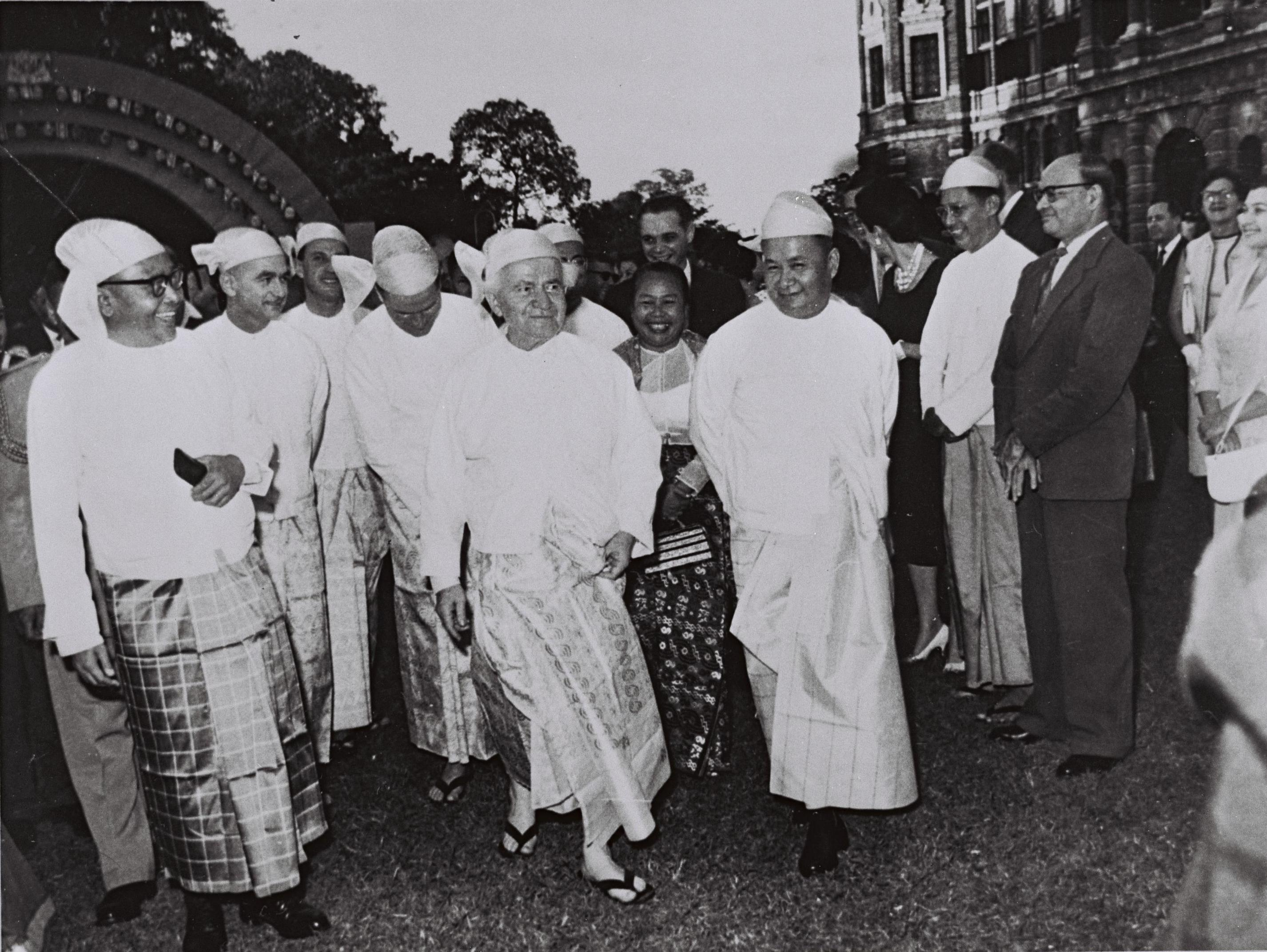
David Ben-Gurion dressed in Burmese national costume during his visit to Rangoon, Burma, as guest of Prime Minister U Nu in May 1961

[Thank you] for the personal friendship which binds you and me with ties of love. May you continue to guide your people toward economic, social, and cultural progress. This is your historic mission.

— Your friend and brother, David Ben-Gurion.

=== 1962 Burmese coup d'état ===
After the 1962 Burmese coup d'état by the Tatmadaw, Prime Minister U Nu was placed in detention and replaced by General Ne Win. Ne Win overthrew the democratic Union Parliament of U Nu and established Burma as a one-party socialist state. With his rule, Ne Win brought significant isolationism to Burma, shutting its doors to the outside world, including Israel to a degree, whose relations waned to just military arms trade. Even so, the Embassy of Israel in Yangon and Embassy of Myanmar in Tel Aviv remained open, and Israeli officials continued to make occasional visits to Burma.

=== Relations since 1962 ===
Although the relations between Myanmar and Israel never returned to their pre-1962 levels of warmth, they improved from 1988 onwards and remained relatively strong throughout the 21st century. In addition to security cooperation through the sales of arms, the Israeli government, within the framework of the Israel Forum for International Humanitarian Aid (IsraAid), trains Myanmar government officials. Delegations from Myanmar come to Israel for training, mainly in the fields of agriculture, and Israel provides scientific support and advanced technological solutions to Myanmar. From the 1950s to 1990s, Israel exported assault rifles, submachine guns, artillery, UAV systems, and upgraded fighter jets to Myanmar. After Western sanctions on Myanmar post-1988, Israel filled the arms-export gap to the military junta.

Israel has also, however, consistently expressed support for former opposition leader and state counsellor Aung San Suu Kyi. In November 2010, following her release from house arrest, Israel's Ministry of Foreign Affairs issued a statement welcoming her freedom and hoping it would lead to democratisation and national reconciliation in Myanmar. In February 2021, after the military coup in Myanmar, Israel called for the release of Aung San Suu Kyi and other detained leaders, reaffirming its support for Myanmar's democratic process.

In September 2015, Min Aung Hlaing, then commander-in-chief of Myanmar's armed forces visited Israel. He toured Israeli defence manufacturers, inspected naval bases and placed orders for FAC Super Dvora Mk III patrol boats.

In a 2016 interview with a local news website in Myanmar, former Israeli ambassador to Myanmar Daniel Zonshine described the ties between the state of Israel and Myanmar as "good and friendly, with the potential to be even better and friendlier." Maung Maung Lynn, the ambassador of Myanmar gave his credentials to president Reuven Rivlin in August 2016. The ambassador's daughter is attending Interdisciplinary Center Herzliya and is the first Burmese student at that campus.

== Trade ==
=== Arms sales ===
At the beginning of 1954, a Burmese procurement delegation arrived in Israel. Following the visit, arms deals were signed between the countries. In March 1954, Israel transferred 30 Spitfires to Burma (after they had been replaced by Gloster Meteor jets in the Israeli Air Force) and trained 6 Burmese pilots in Israel. and in September 1954 a technical delegation of the Israeli Air Force went to Burma to help train local technicians in the maintenance of the planes. The deal also included the sale of cannons, machine guns and ammunition for aircraft in a deal whose scope was about US$1,000,000. Another deal included the sale of 30,000 rifles and Israeli military delegations that helped in the fields of military medicine, the organisation of the parachuting school, and more.

Immediately after the military coup in 1988, a European embargo was imposed on Myanmar, which was later joined by the United States. The junta, which was looking for new weapons suppliers for the Burmese army and police, turned to Israel. In August 1989, two ships arrived in Myanmar. They were loaded with Eastern European weapons that included 55 mm anti-tank missiles and 40 mm grenade launchers. The ships, which sailed under the Belgian and Singaporean flags, transferred weapons that Israel captured in Lebanon during the First Lebanon War after the withdrawal of the Palestinian forces, and sold them to Myanmar.

In 1991, an Israeli security delegation visited Myanmar and sold 500 Uzi submachine guns for use by the junta's special security forces. Also, in the early 1990s, the Myanmar army began producing assault rifles similar to the Israeli IMI Galil assault rifle, called the MA-1 family, which was a clone with modifications made for localised conditions. In August 1997, the Israeli company Elbit won a tender for the improvement of 36 fighter planes of the Myanmar army. Elbit provided advanced navigation systems, night vision devices, and laser-guided bombs of various models. A year later, 12 more planes were upgraded by Elbit and supplied with Israeli air-to-air missiles. In 1998, the Myanmar army purchased 16 155 mm cannons manufactured by Soltam Systems, which were apparently transferred through Singapore.

Israel was reported to be selling arms to Myanmar after the 2021 Myanmar coup d'état.

=== Advocacy against the sales ===
In response to the persecution of the Rohingya in Myanmar starting in 2016, there were calls to refrain from selling arms from Israel to Myanmar. In September 2017, a petition against Israeli arms sales to Myanmar over human rights violations against the Rohingya minority was brought before the Supreme Court of Israel. The Supreme Court's ruling on the case was subjected to a gag order.

During the 2021 Myanmar coup d'état and subsequent protests, a number of Israeli companies were accused of continuing to help the Myanmar junta acquire modern weapons that eventually were used to suppress protesters, despite the fact that Israel had imposed a lethal embargo since 2018.

== Political disputes ==
Despite their historical close relations, the two nations disagreed on some topics. In 1956, U Nu publicly distanced himself from Israel over the Suez Canal crisis. The Burmese leader condemned Israel and Western powers, including the United Kingdom and France, and backed the United Nations’ calls for the withdrawal of Israeli troops from Egypt.

On the other hand, Israel has, on several occasions, expressed support for pro-democracy activist Aung San Suu Kyi, the leading opposition to the Myanmar military junta.

In response to the Israel-Gaza war in 2023, the military junta called for the "relevant parties to exercise restraint and to resolve the issue peacefully" which received criticism by the international community who pointed to the junta's treatment of its own civilians. In one example, an airstrike on a crowd of civilians was condemned by the United Nations in 2023.

== See also ==
- List of ambassadors of Israel to Myanmar
- Embassy of Israel, Yangon
- Embassy of Myanmar, Tel Aviv
- Internal Conflict in Myanmar
