= Embassy of Myanmar, Tel Aviv =

Diplomatic mission of the Republic of The Union of Myanmar in Israel

Embassy of Myanmar, Tel Aviv שגרירות מיאנמר בתל אביב
- Location: Tel Aviv-Yafo, Israel
- Address: Sharbat Building 16th Floor, No.4 Kaufman Street, Tel Aviv-Yafo, 6801296
- Coordinates: 32°03′48″N 34°45′42″E
- Ambassador: Maung Maung Lynn
- Jurisdiction: Israel
- Website: metelaviv.org

The Embassy of The Republic of The Union of Myanmar in Tel Aviv is the Diplomatic mission of Myanmar (formerly Burma) to Israel. The embassy, established in the 1950s, was the first East Asian embassy established in Israel. The current ambassador of Myanmar to Israel is Ambassador Maung Maung Lynn.

== See also ==
- Israel–Myanmar relations
- Embassy of Israel, Yangon
- List of diplomatic missions of Myanmar
