= List of diplomatic missions of Israel =

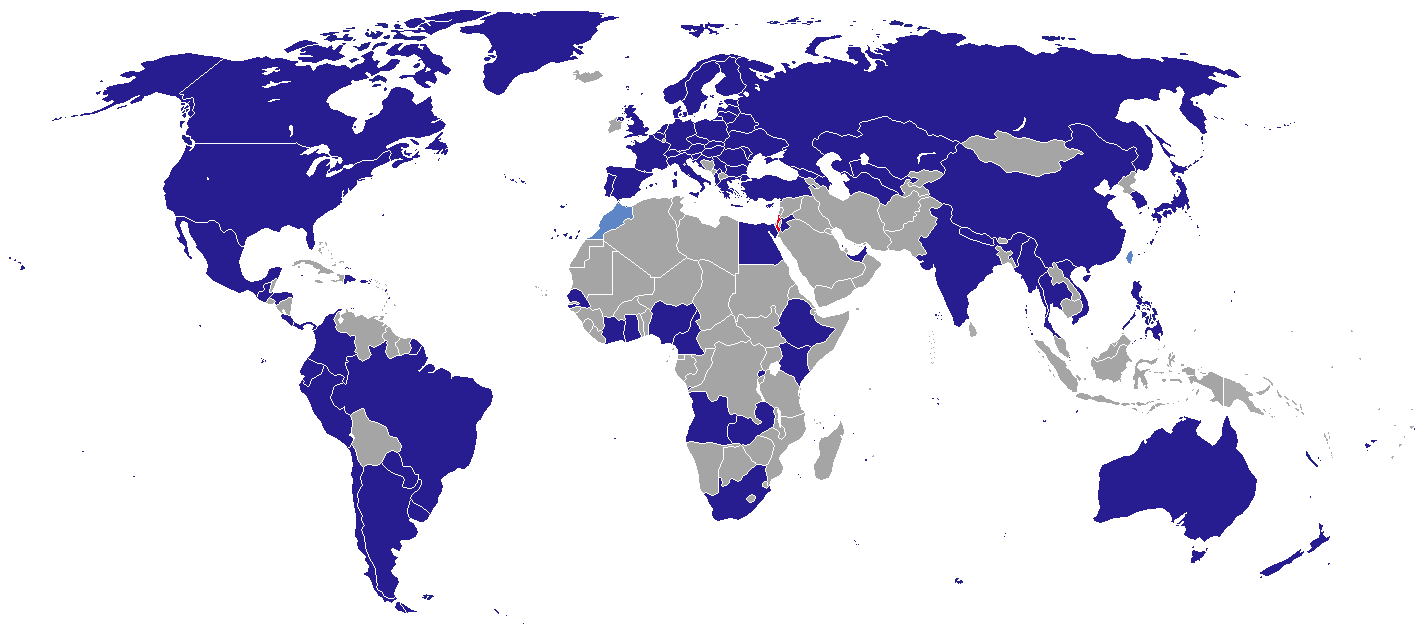
Diplomatic missions of Israel

This is a list of diplomatic missions of Israel, excluding honorary consulates. As of November 2021, there are 82 resident embassies, including a Taiwan office, and 22 consulate-generals and two representative missions in the 165 states that recognise Israel.

Israel also maintains five missions to multilateral organisations, of which four missions are to the United Nations and one mission to the European Union. Israel also maintains an economic and cultural office in Taiwan and a representative office to the International Renewable Energy Agency in the United Arab Emirates.

Israel's biggest diplomatic coup in the international community came with peace treaties and recognition from Arab countries such as Egypt in the late 1970s, and Jordan in the early 1990s, leading to embassies being opened in Cairo and Amman. During the late 1980s, several Israeli embassies were opened/reopened in former Eastern Bloc states as the Cold War ended. At the beginning of the 1990s, Israel established official relations with the Soviet Union, India and China. The prospects of a Middle East peace agreement in the mid-1990s led to Israeli government offices appearing as trade representative offices being opened in a handful of Arab states such as Bahrain, Qatar, Oman and Morocco. By 2000s, all have since closed the Israeli offices. Israel closed its embassies in Mauritania and Venezuela after the 2008 Gaza War, following a request to do so by their national governments. Following the signing of the Abraham Accords, Israel opened embassies in Abu Dhabi and Manama in 2021, a consulate-general in Dubai, and a liaison office in Rabat.

== Africa ==
Host country	Host city	Mission	Concurrent accreditation	Ref.
Angola	Luanda	Embassy	Countries: Mozambique São Tomé and Príncipe	
Cameroon	Yaoundé	Embassy	Countries: Central African Republic Congo-Brazzaville Equatorial Guinea Gabon	
Egypt	Cairo	Embassy		
Ethiopia	Addis Ababa	Embassy	Multilateral Organizations: African Union	
Ghana	Accra	Embassy	Countries: Liberia Sierra Leone	
Ivory Coast	Abidjan	Embassy	Countries: Benin Burkina Faso Togo	
Kenya	Nairobi	Embassy	Countries: Malawi Seychelles Uganda Tanzania	
Morocco	Rabat	Liaison Office		
Nigeria	Abuja	Embassy		
Rwanda	Kigali	Embassy	Countries: Burundi	
Senegal	Dakar	Embassy	Countries: Cape Verde Chad Gambia Guinea Guinea-Bissau	
South Africa	Pretoria	Embassy	Countries: Eswatini Lesotho Madagascar Mauritius	
Zambia	Lusaka	Embassy		

== Americas ==
Host country	Host city	Mission	Concurrent accreditation	Ref.
Argentina	Buenos Aires	Embassy		
Brazil	Brasília	Embassy		
Brazil	São Paulo	Consulate-General		
Canada	Ottawa	Embassy		
Canada	Montreal	Consulate-General		
Canada	Toronto	Consulate-General		
Chile	Santiago de Chile	Embassy		
Colombia	Bogotá	Embassy		
Costa Rica	San José	Embassy		
Dominican Republic	Santo Domingo	Embassy	Countries: Antigua and Barbuda Dominica Grenada Haiti Jamaica St. Lucia St. Vincent and the Grenadines St. Kitts and Nevis	
Ecuador	Quito	Embassy		
Guatemala	Guatemala City	Embassy	Countries: El Salvador	
Honduras	Tegucigalpa	Embassy		
Mexico	Mexico City	Embassy	Countries: Bahamas Belize	
Panama	Panama City	Embassy	Countries: Barbados Guyana Suriname Trinidad and Tobago	
Paraguay	Asunción	Embassy		
Peru	Lima	Embassy		
United States	Washington, D.C.	Embassy	Multilateral Organizations: Organization of American States (Note: Accredited as an observer mission.)	
United States	Atlanta	Consulate-General	Multilateral Organizations: Organization of American States	
United States	Boston	Consulate-General	Multilateral Organizations: Organization of American States	
United States	Chicago	Consulate-General	Multilateral Organizations: Organization of American States	
United States	Houston	Consulate-General	Multilateral Organizations: Organization of American States	
United States	Los Angeles	Consulate-General	Multilateral Organizations: Organization of American States	
United States	Miami	Consulate-General	Multilateral Organizations: Organization of American States	
United States	New York City	Consulate-General	Multilateral Organizations: Organization of American States	
United States	San Francisco	Consulate-General	Multilateral Organizations: Organization of American States	
Uruguay	Montevideo	Embassy		

== Asia ==
Host country	Host city	Mission	Concurrent accreditation	Ref.
Azerbaijan	Baku	Embassy		
Bahrain	Manama	Embassy		
China	Beijing	Embassy	Countries: Mongolia	
China	Chengdu	Consulate-General	Countries: Mongolia	
China	Guangzhou	Consulate-General	Countries: Mongolia	
China	Hong Kong	Consulate-General	Countries: Mongolia	
China	Shanghai	Consulate-General	Countries: Mongolia	
Georgia	Tbilisi	Embassy	Countries: Armenia	
India	New Delhi	Embassy	Countries: Bhutan Sri Lanka	
India	Bangalore	Consulate-General	Countries: Bhutan Sri Lanka	
India	Mumbai	Consulate-General	Countries: Bhutan Sri Lanka	
Japan	Tokyo	Embassy		
Jordan	Amman	Embassy		
Kazakhstan	Astana	Embassy	Countries: Kyrgyzstan	
Myanmar	Yangon	Embassy		
Nepal	Kathmandu	Embassy		
Philippines	Manila	Embassy		
Singapore	Singapore	Embassy	Countries: Timor-Leste	
South Korea	Seoul	Embassy		
Taiwan	Taipei	Economic & Cultural Office		
Thailand	Bangkok	Embassy	Countries: Cambodia	
Turkey	Ankara	Embassy		
Turkey	Istanbul	Consulate-General		
Turkmenistan	Ashgabat	Embassy		
United Arab Emirates	Abu Dhabi	Embassy		
United Arab Emirates	Dubai	Consulate-General		
Uzbekistan	Tashkent	Embassy	Countries: Tajikistan	
Vietnam	Hanoi	Embassy	Countries: Laos	

== Europe ==
Host country	Host city	Mission	Concurrent accreditation	Ref.
Albania	Tirana	Embassy	Countries: Bosnia and Herzegovina	
Austria	Vienna	Embassy		
Belarus	Minsk	Embassy		
Belgium	Brussels	Embassy	Countries: Luxembourg	
Bulgaria	Sofia	Embassy		
Croatia	Zagreb	Embassy		
Cyprus	Nicosia	Embassy		
Czech Republic	Prague	Embassy		
Denmark	Copenhagen	Embassy		
Estonia	Tallinn	Embassy		
Finland	Helsinki	Embassy		
France	Paris	Embassy	Countries: Monaco	
Germany	Berlin	Embassy		
Germany	Munich	Consulate-General		
Greece	Athens	Embassy		
Holy See	Rome	Embassy		
Hungary	Budapest	Embassy		
Italy	Rome	Embassy	Countries: San Marino; Multilateral organization: FAO	
Latvia	Riga	Embassy		
Lithuania	Vilnius	Embassy		
Moldova	Chișinău	Embassy		
Netherlands	The Hague	Embassy		
Norway	Oslo	Embassy	Countries: Iceland	
Poland	Warsaw	Embassy		
Portugal	Lisbon	Embassy		
Romania	Bucharest	Embassy		
Russia	Moscow	Embassy		
Russia	Saint Petersburg	Consulate-General		
Serbia	Belgrade	Embassy	Countries: Montenegro	
Slovakia	Bratislava	Embassy		
Slovenia	Ljubljana	Embassy		
Spain	Madrid	Embassy	Countries: Andorra	
Sweden	Stockholm	Embassy		
Switzerland	Bern	Embassy	Countries: Liechtenstein	
Ukraine	Kyiv	Embassy		
United Kingdom	London	Embassy		

== Oceania ==
Host country	Host city	Mission	Concurrent accreditation	Ref.
Australia	Canberra	Embassy		
Fiji	Suva	Embassy		
New Zealand	Wellington	Embassy	Countries: Cook Islands Samoa Tonga	

== Multilateral organizations ==
Organization	Host city	Host country	Mission	Concurrent accreditation	Ref.
EU and NATO	Brussels	Belgium	Mission		
United Nations	Geneva	Switzerland	Permanent Mission		
United Nations	New York City	United States	Permanent Mission		
United Nations	Vienna	Austria	Permanent Mission		
OECD	Paris	France	Mission		

== Gallery ==
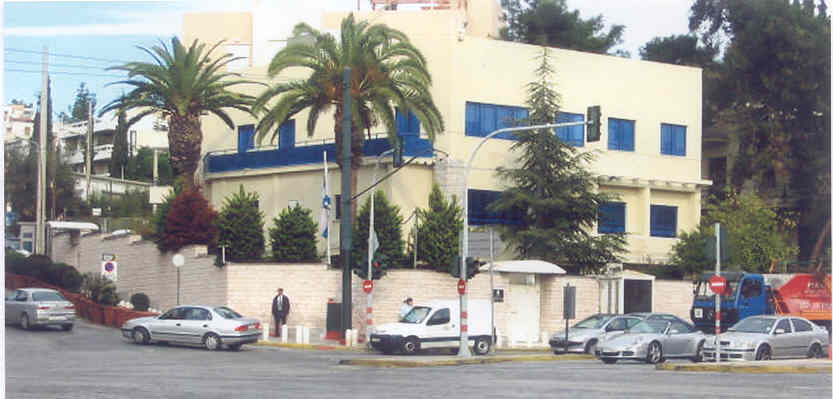
Embassy in Athens

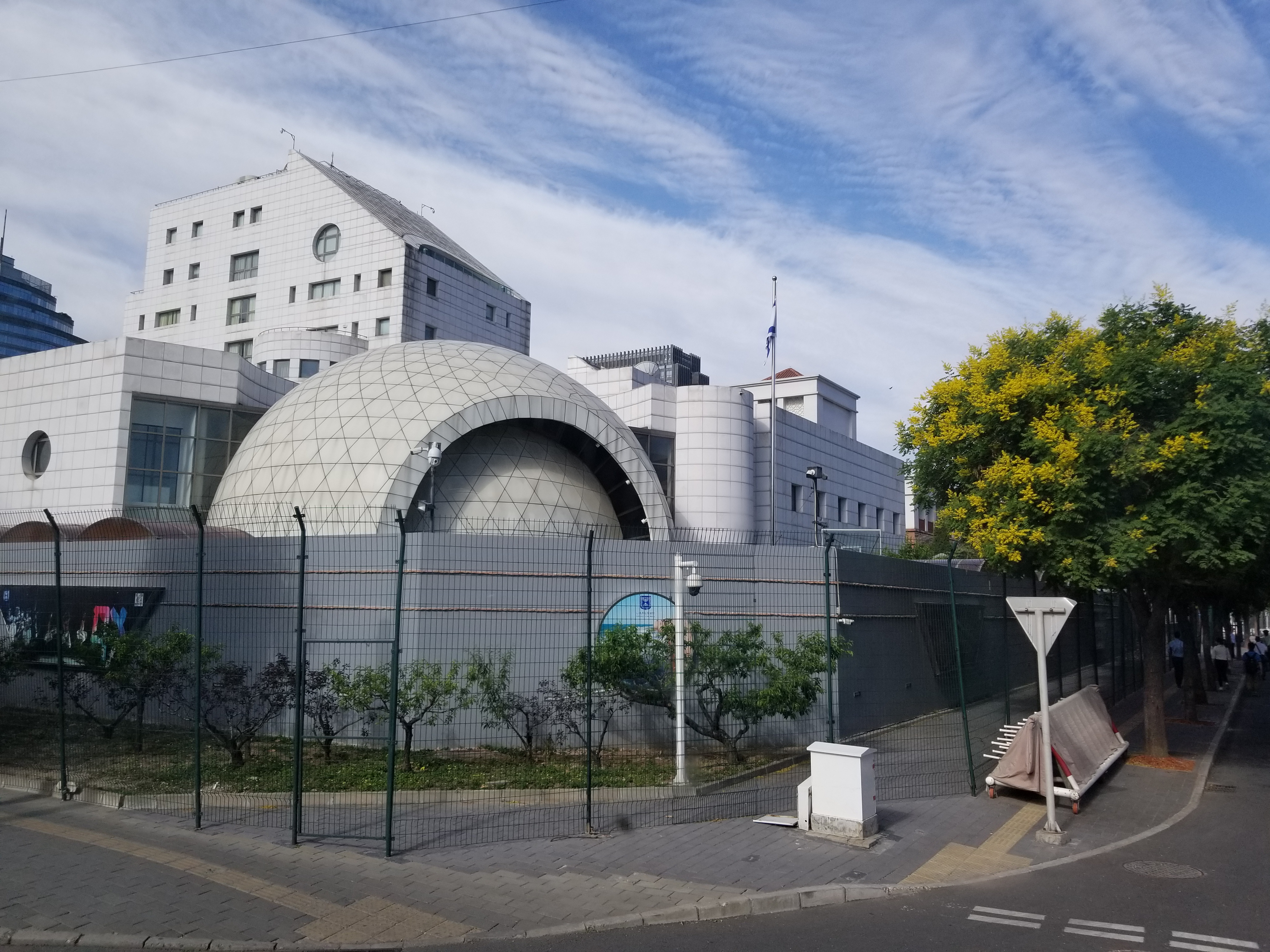
Embassy in Beijing

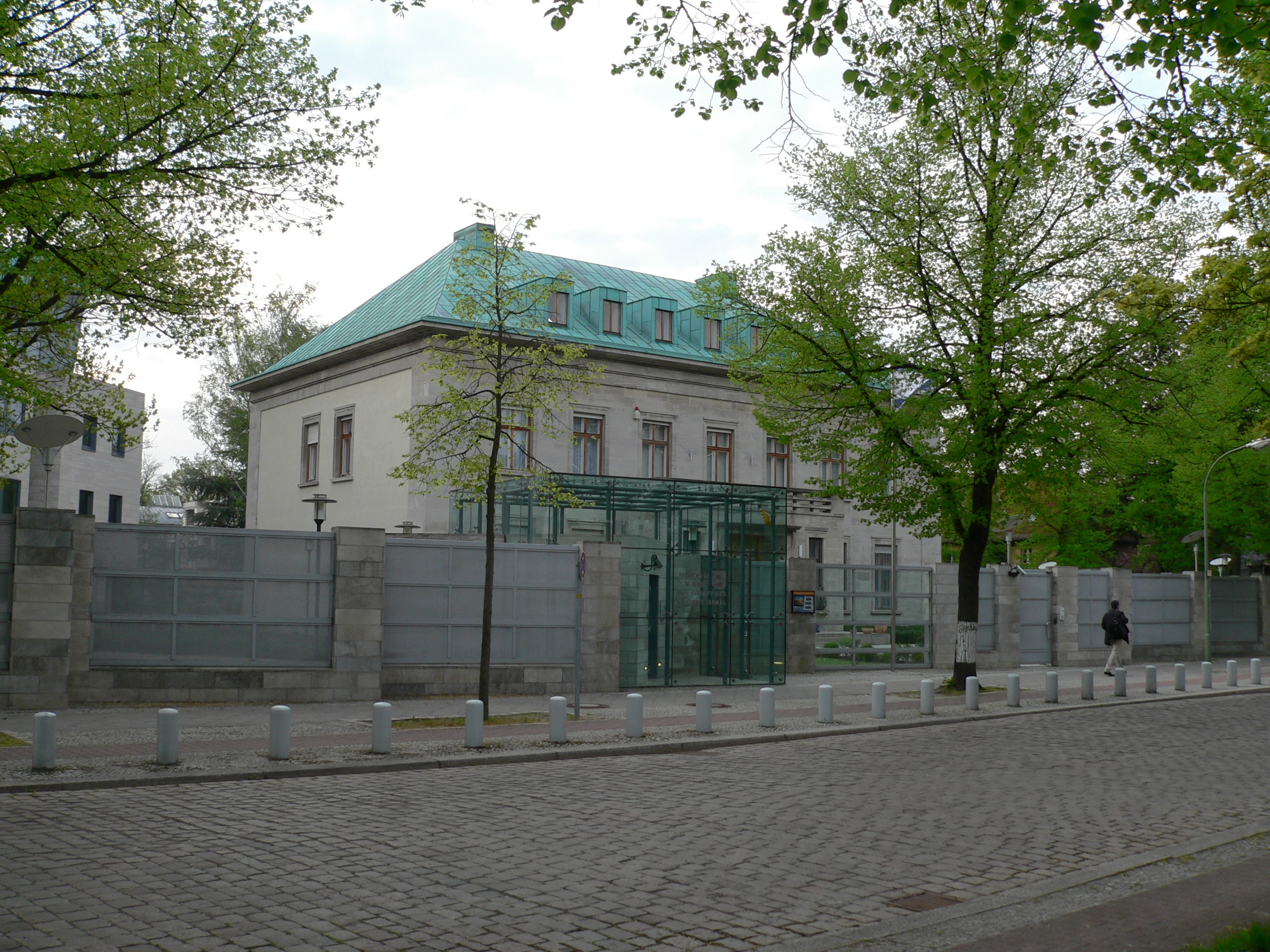
Embassy in Berlin

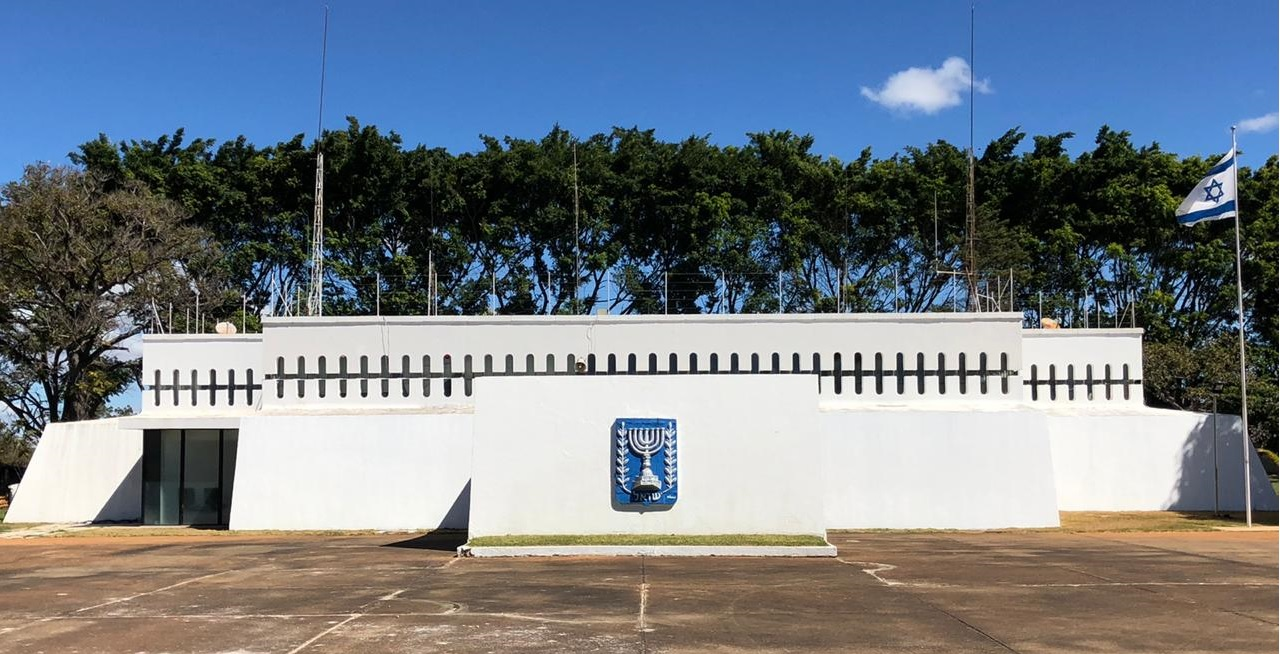
Embassy in Brasília

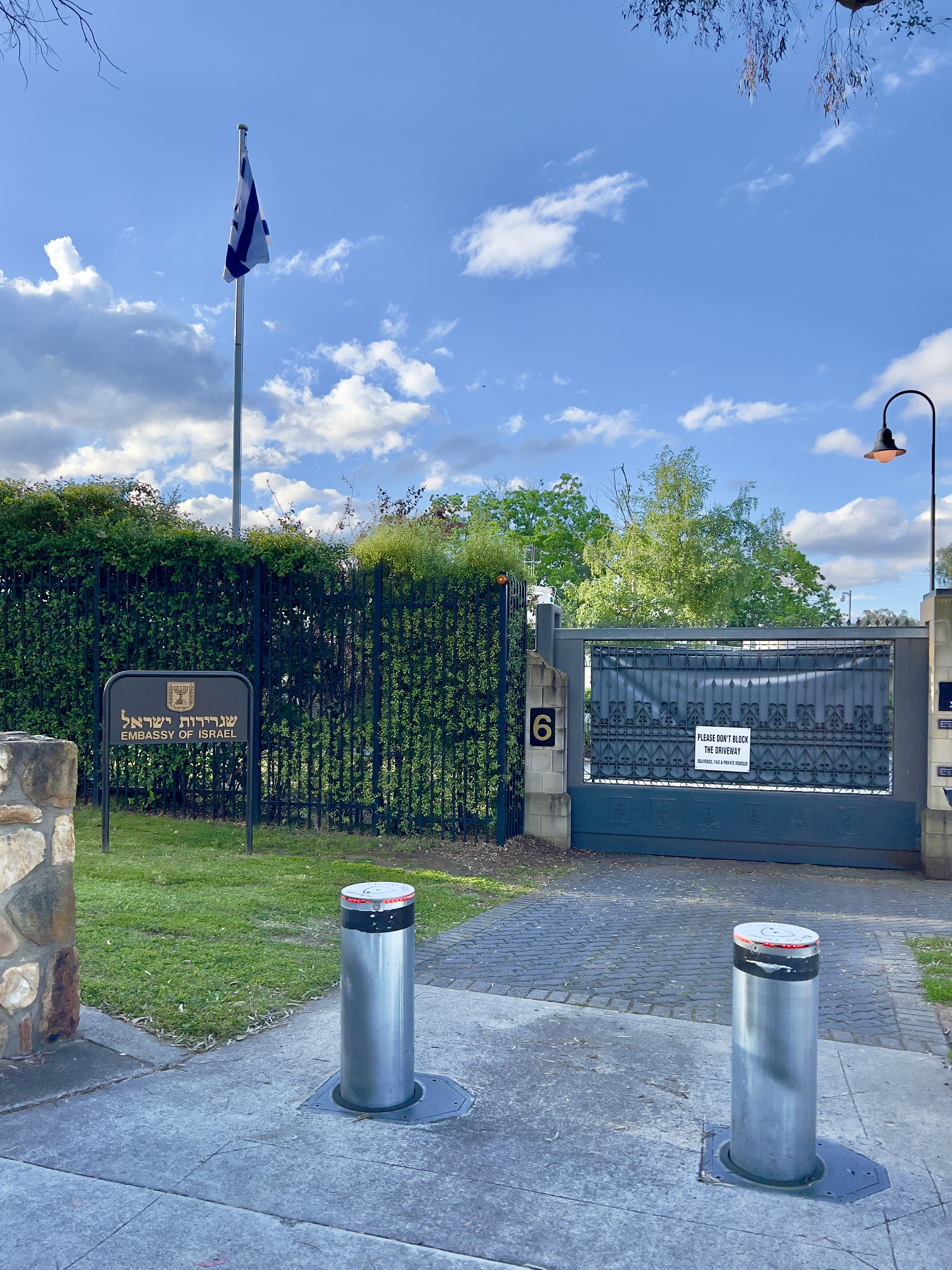
Embassy in Canberra

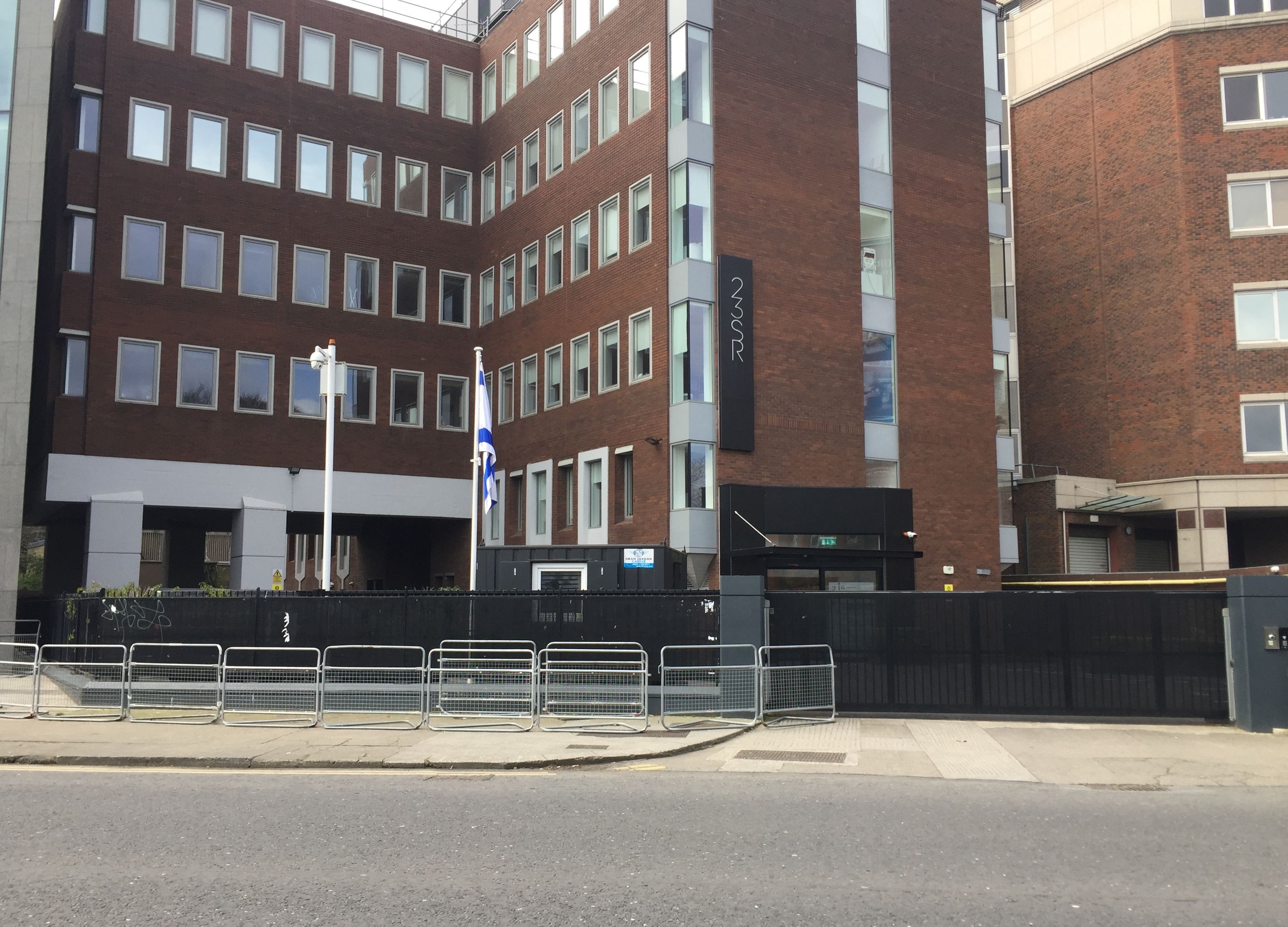
Embassy in Dublin

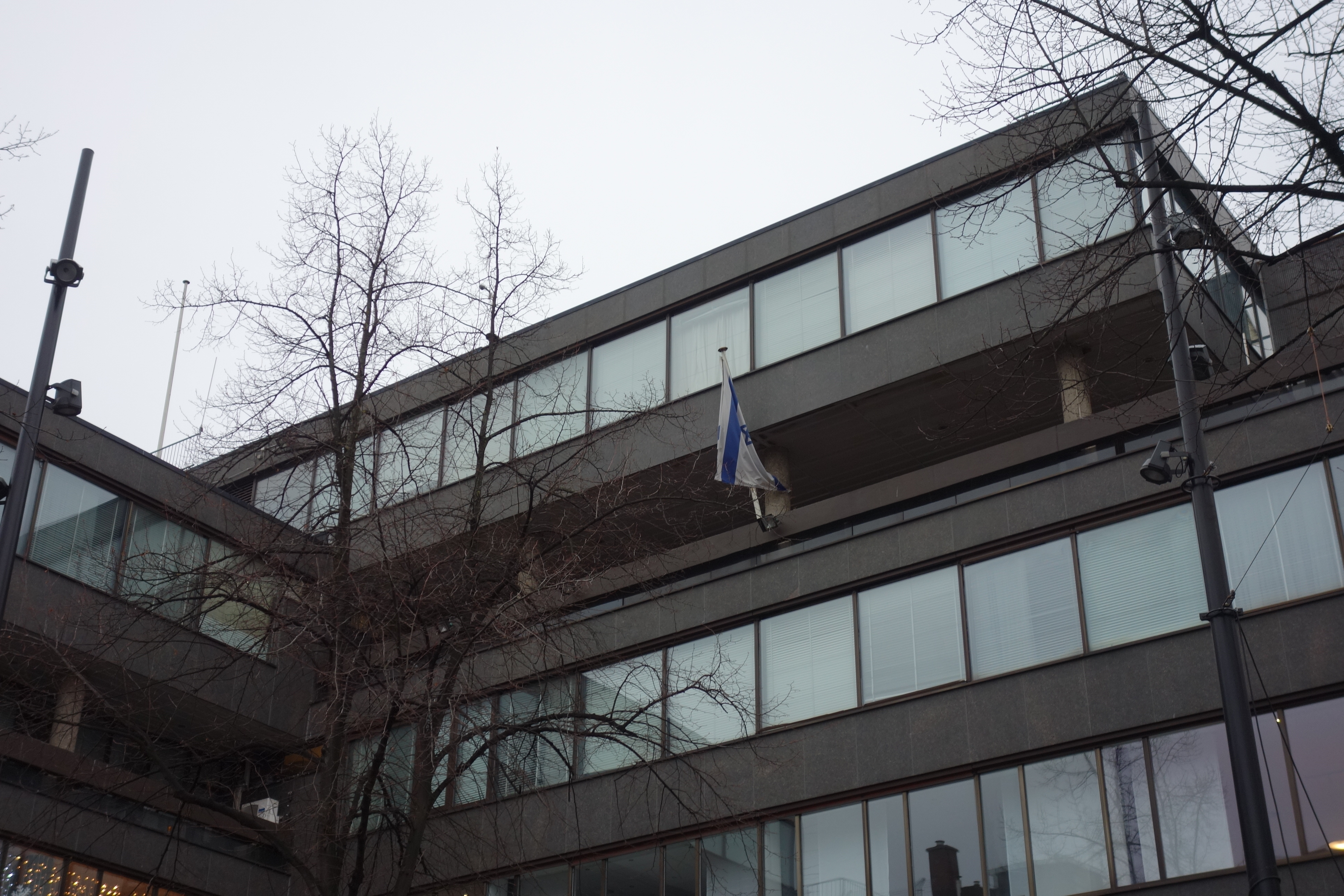
Embassy in The Hague

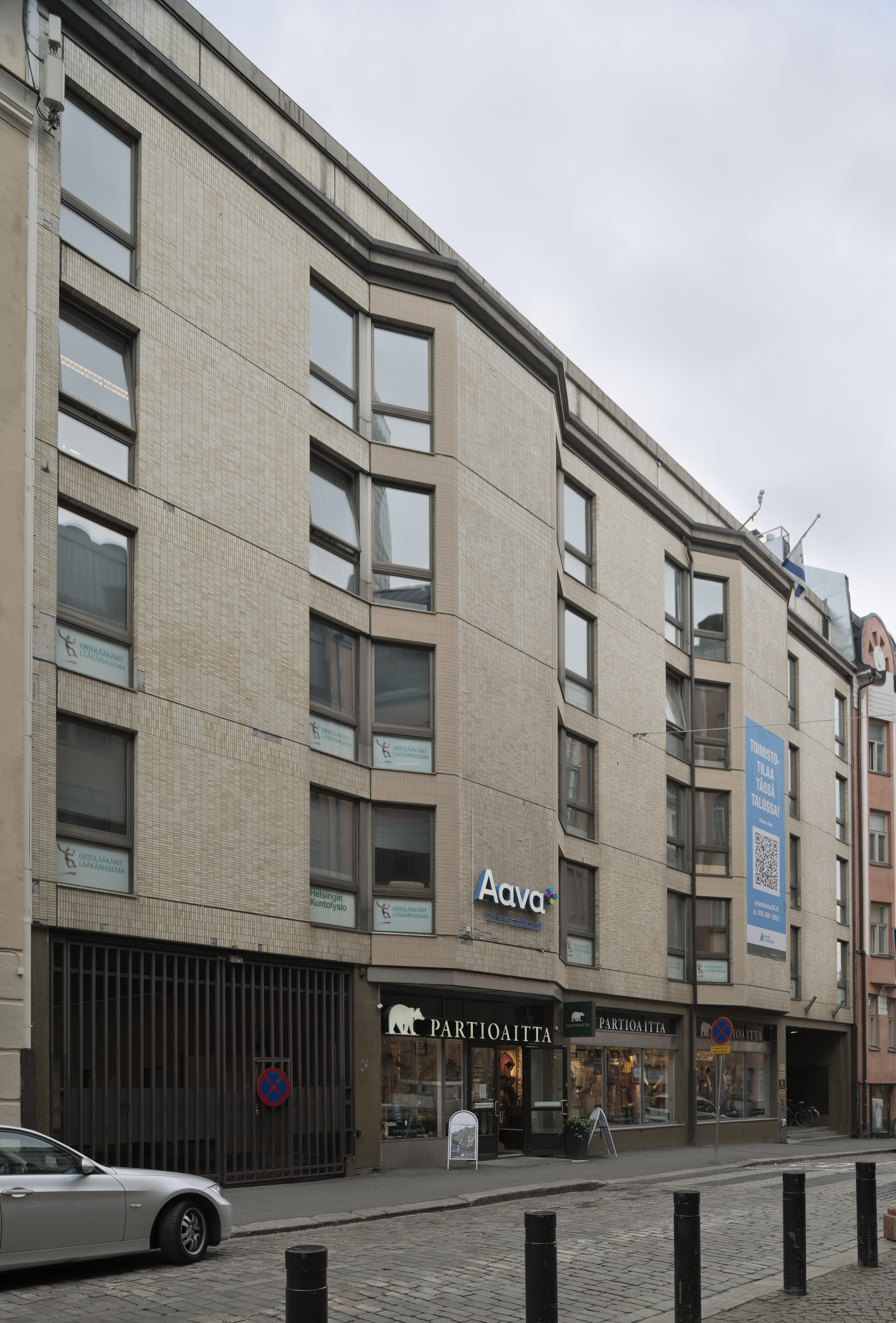
Embassy in Helsinki

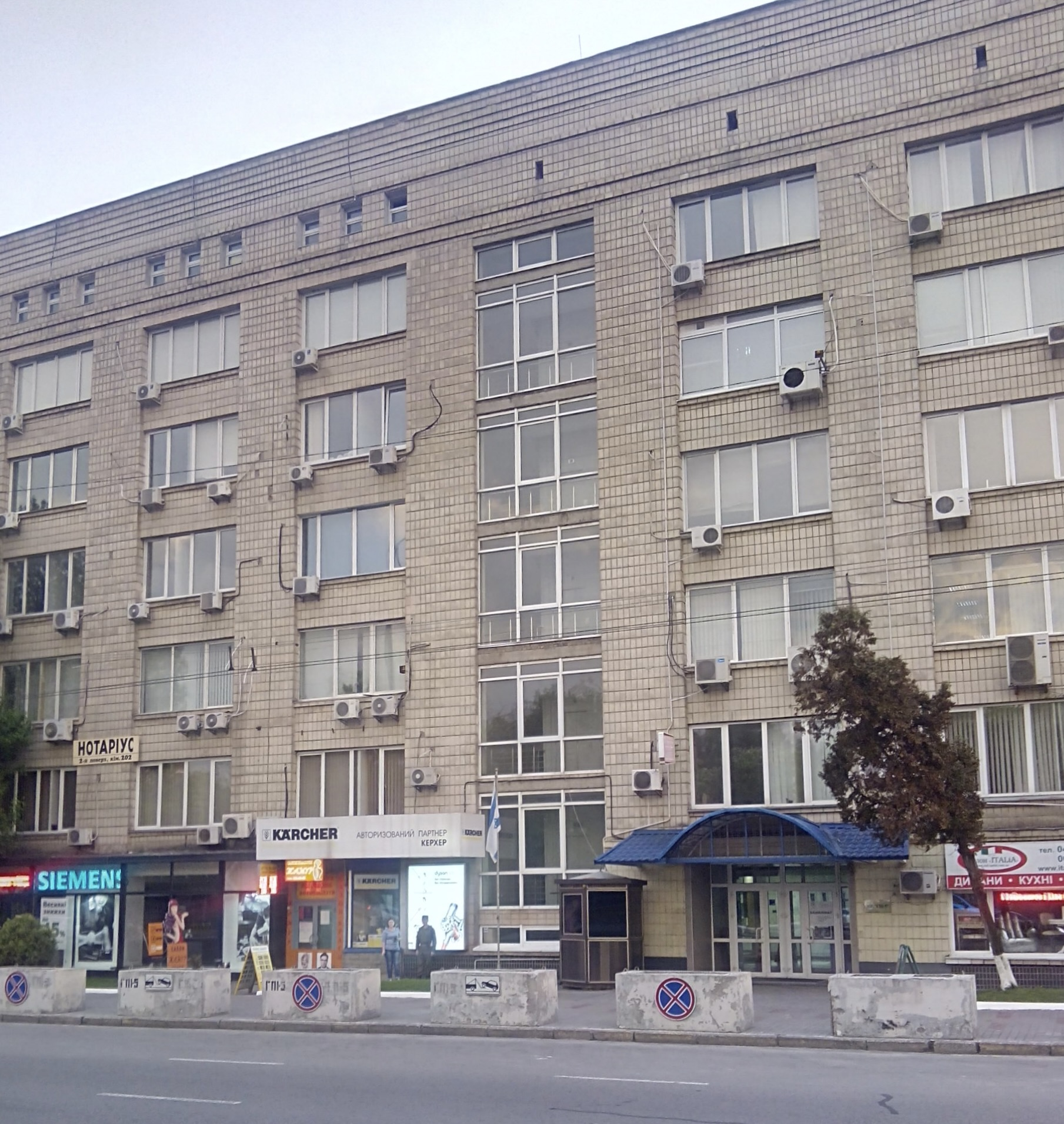
Embassy in Kyiv

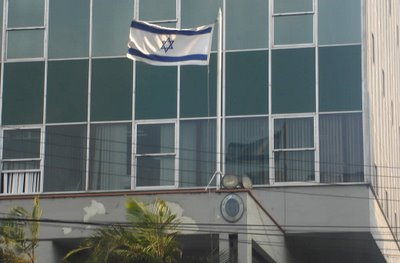
Embassy in Lima

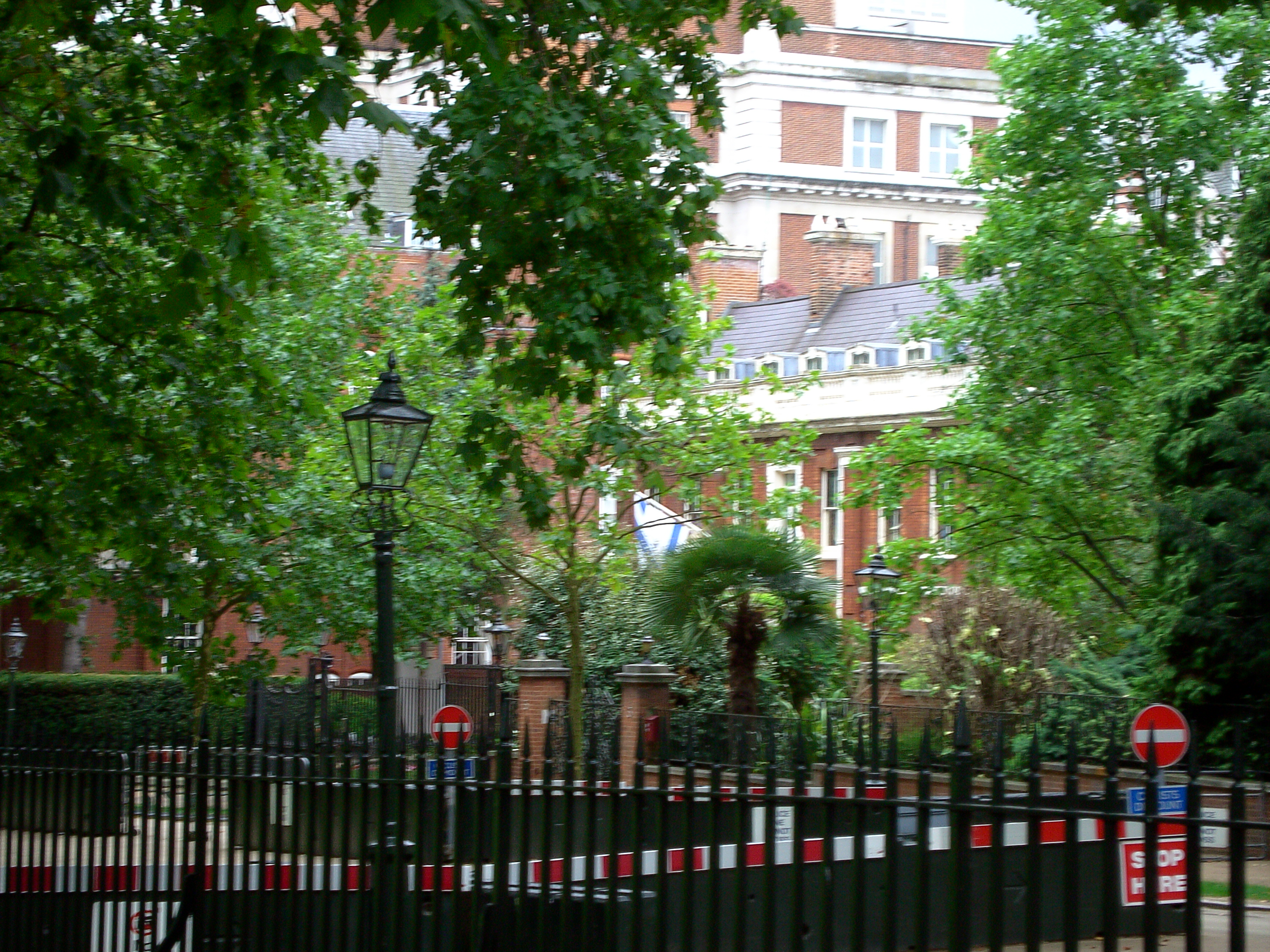
Embassy in London

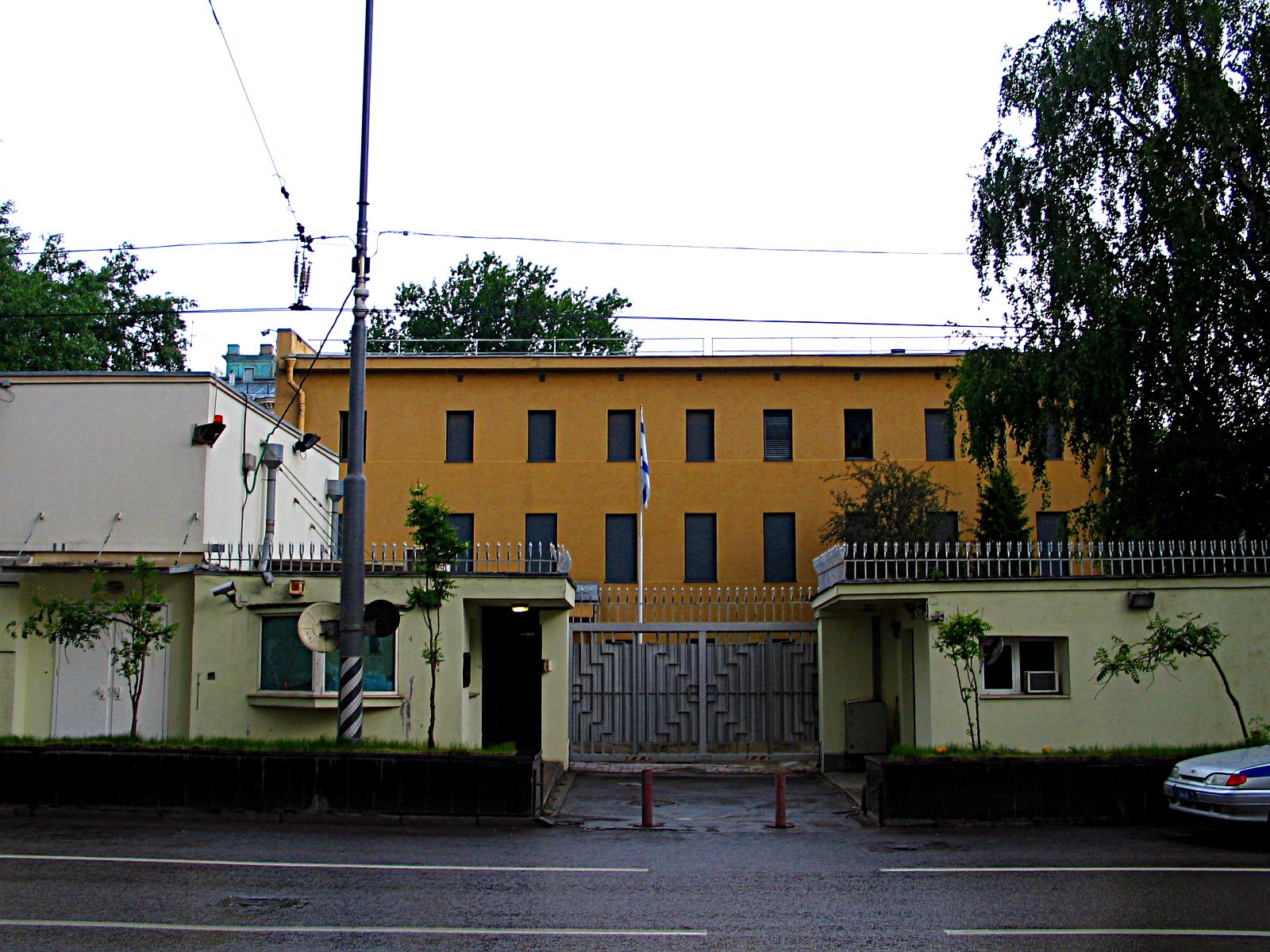
Embassy in Moscow

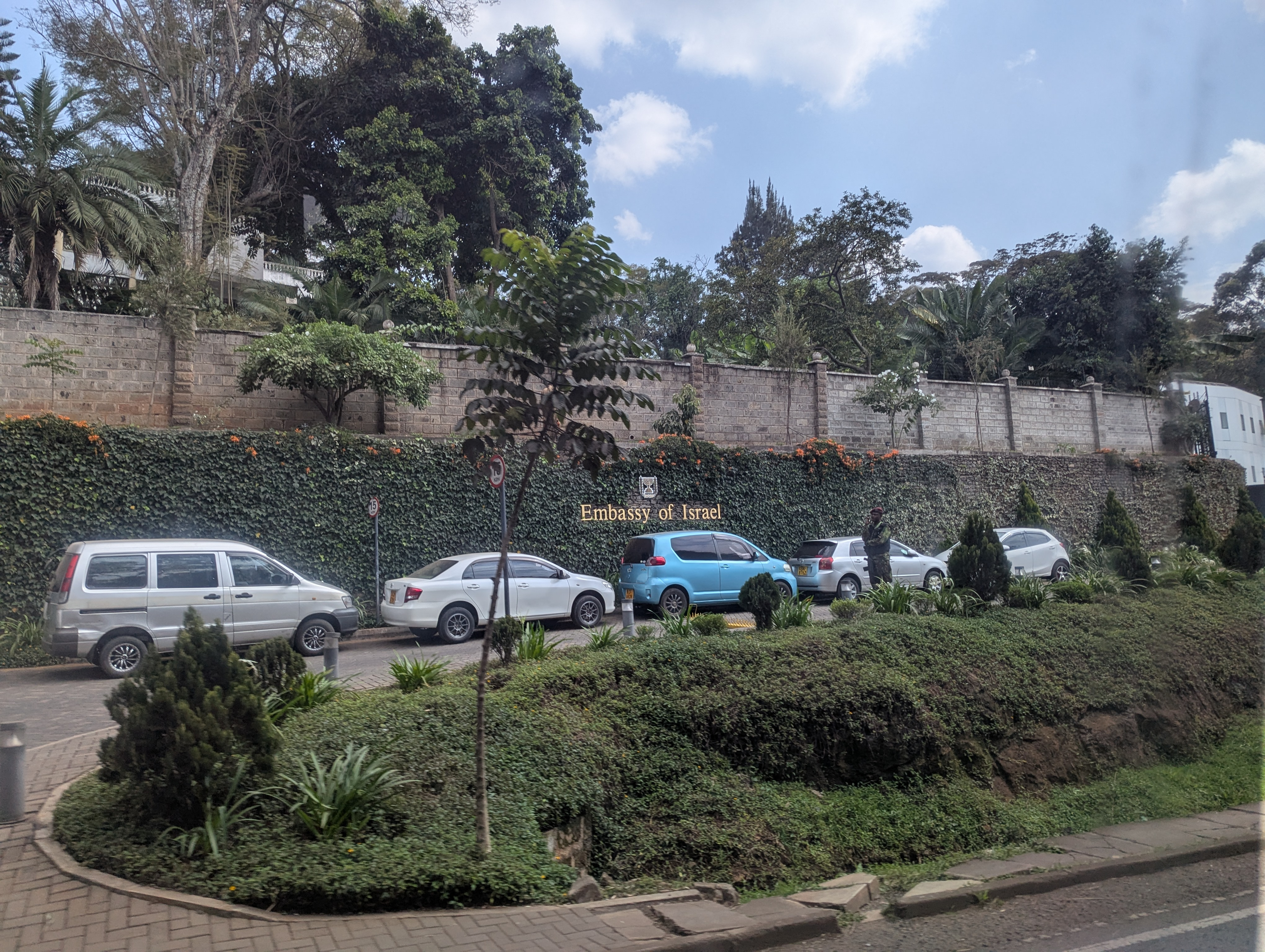
Embassy in Nairobi

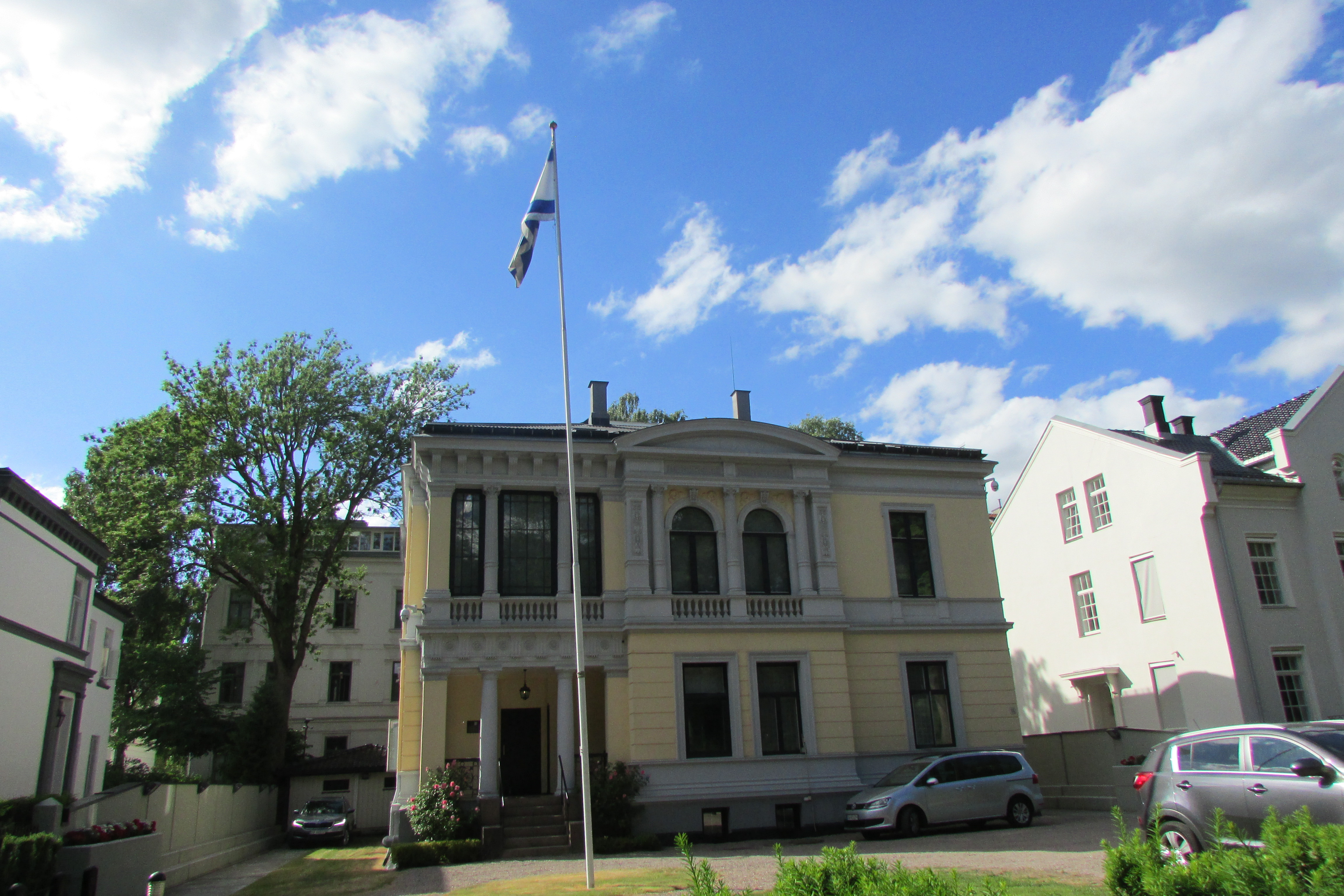
Embassy in Oslo

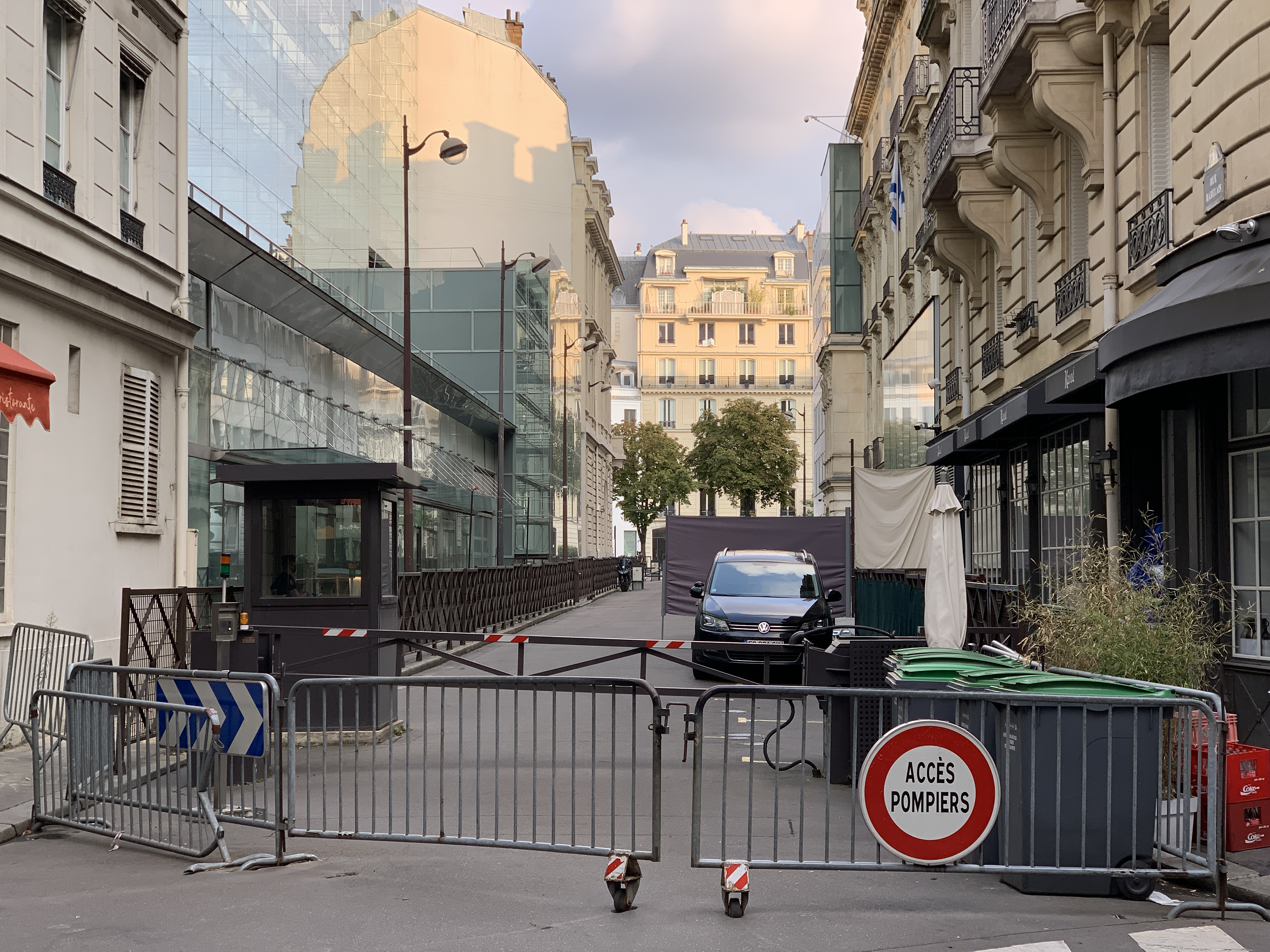
Embassy in Paris

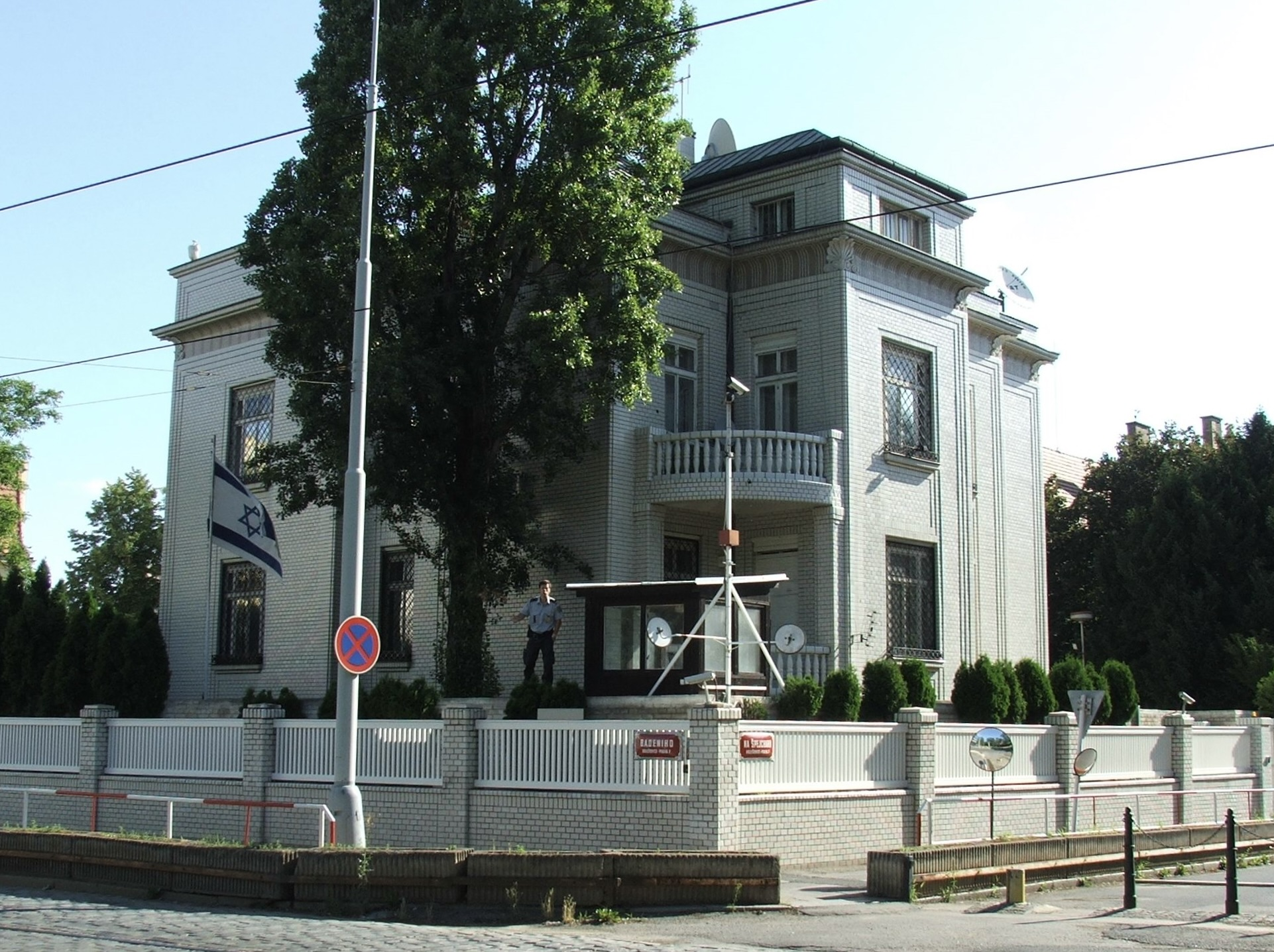
Embassy in Prague

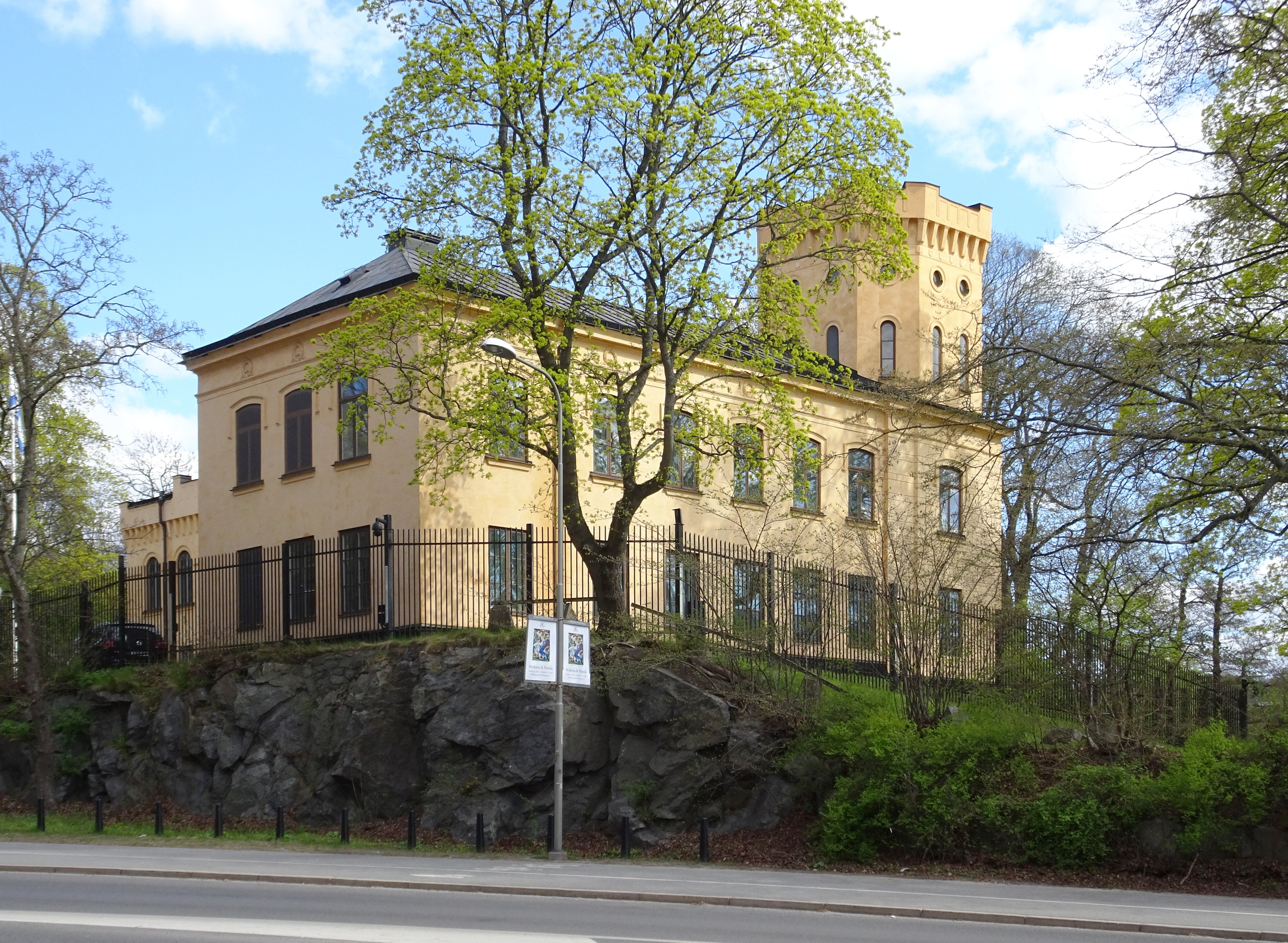
Embassy in Stockholm

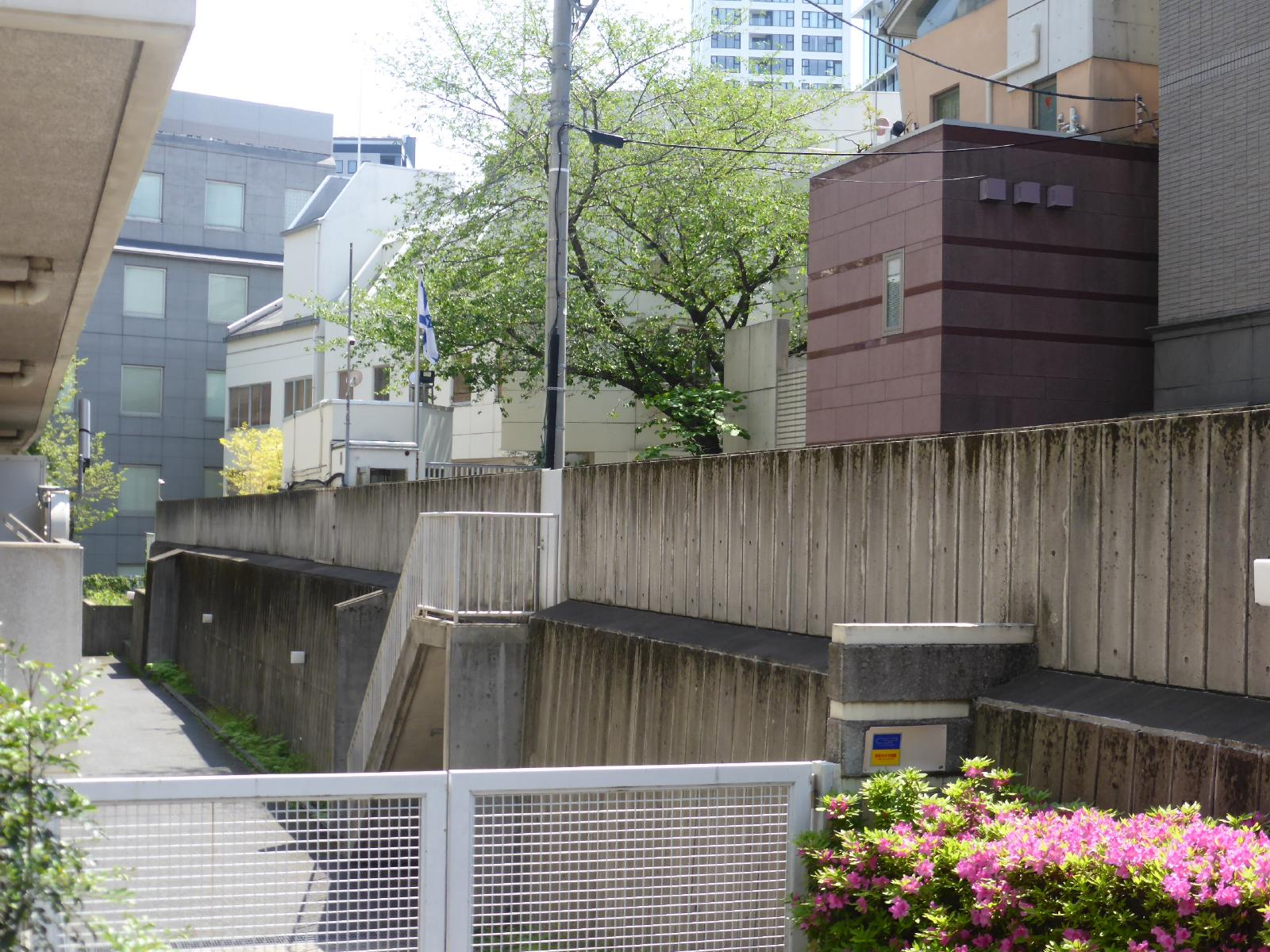
Embassy in Tokyo

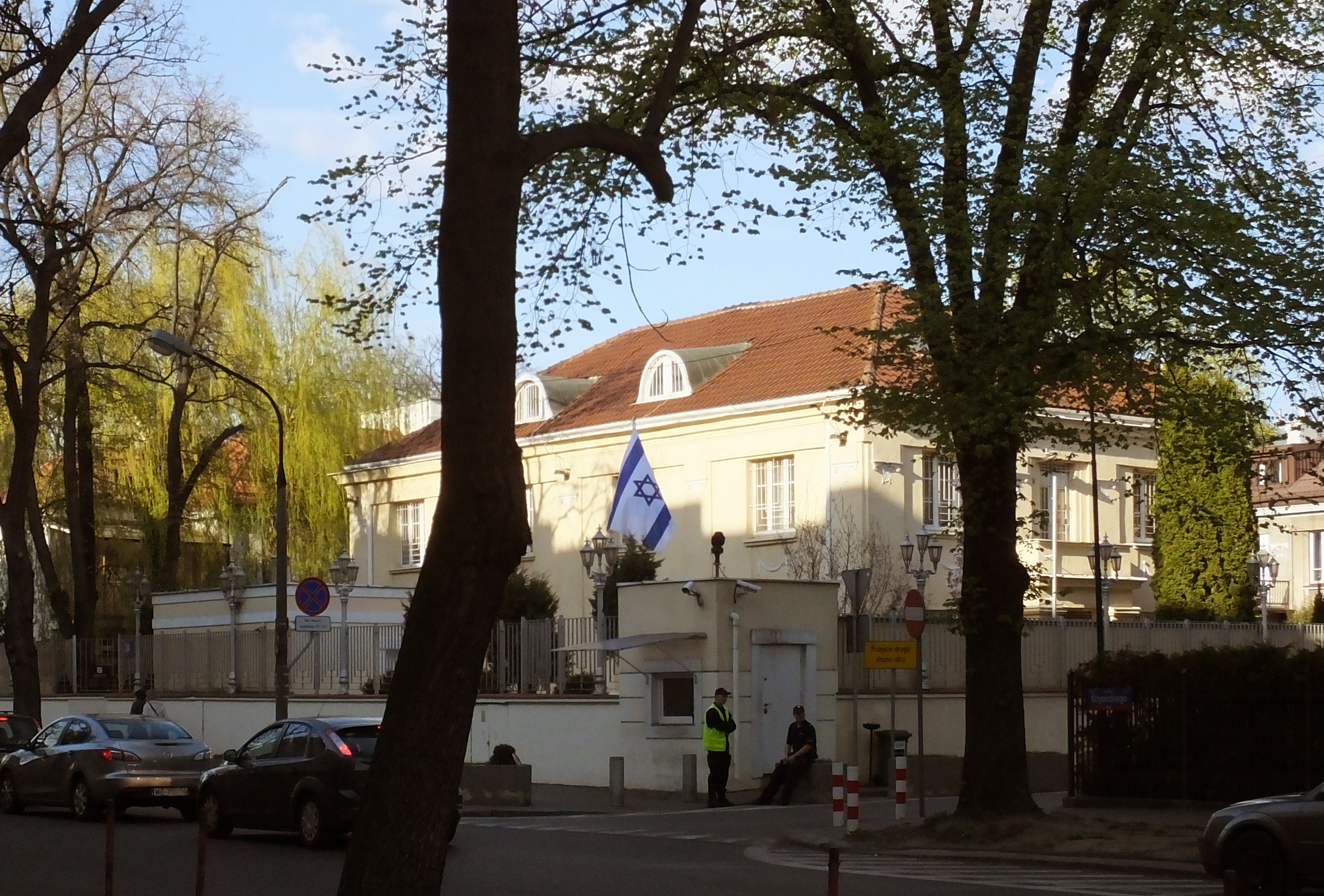
Embassy in Warsaw

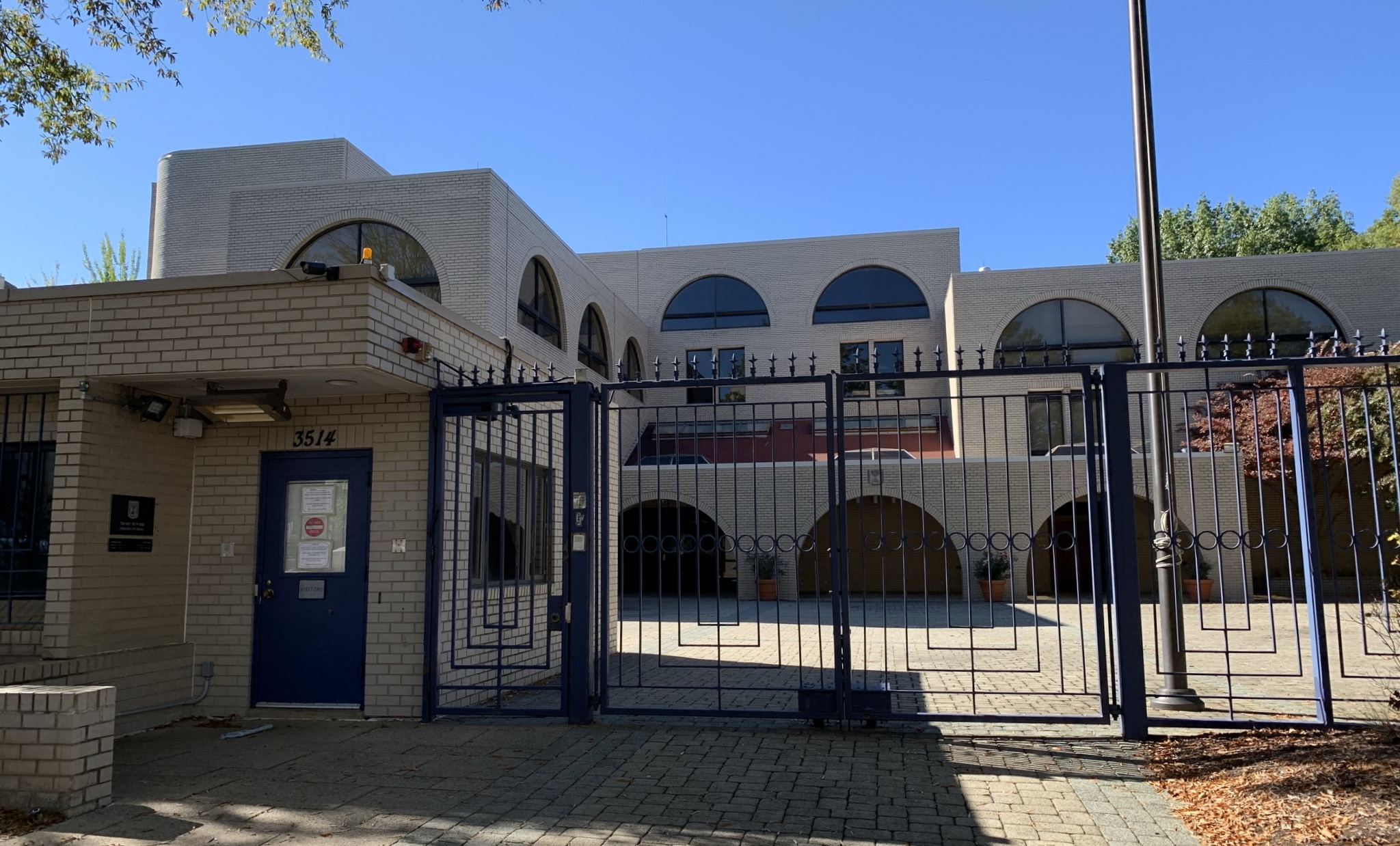
Embassy in Washington, D.C.

== Diplomatic missions to open ==
Host country	Host city	Mission	Ref.
Armenia	Yerevan	Embassy	
Congo-Kinshasa	Kinshasa	Embassy	
Morocco	Rabat	Embassy	
Somaliland	Hargeisa	Embassy	

== Closed missions ==
Host country	Host city	Mission	Year opened	Year closed	Note
Australia	Sydney	Consulate-General	1949	2002	
Bolivia	La Paz	Embassy	1975	2009	
Brazil	Rio de Janeiro	Consulate-General	1949	2002	
Central African Republic	Bangui	Embassy (Note: Resident in Yaounde, Cameroon)	1961	1973	
China	Chengdu	Consulate-General		2026	
Republic of the Congo	Brazzaville	Embassy	1960	1972	
Cuba	Havana	Embassy	1960	1973	
Dahomey	Cotonou	Embassy (Note: Resident in Abidjan, Ivory Coast)	1964	1973	
Democratic Republic of the Congo	Kinshasa	Embassy	1982	2003	
Egypt	Alexandria	Consulate-General	1982	2002	
Eritrea	Asmara	Embassy	1993	2022	
France	Marseille	Consulate-General	1951	2015	
Gabon	Libreville	Embassy	1963	1973	
Guinea	Conakry	Embassy (Note: Resident in Dakar, Senegal)	1959	1967	
Haiti	Port-au-Prince	Embassy (Note: Resident in Santo Domingo, Dominican Republic)	1973	1990	
Islamic Republic of Iran	Tehran	Embassy	1964	1979	
Ireland	Dublin	Embassy	1996	2024	
Italy	Milan	Consulate-General	1967	1996	
Jamaica	Kingston	Embassy	1975	1995	
Khmer Republic	Phnom Penh	Embassy (Note: Resident in Bangkok, Thailand)	1967	1975	
Lebanon	Beirut	Representative Office	1982	1984	
Liberia	Monrovia	Embassy (Note: Resident in Accra, Ghana)	1957	1973	
Madagascar	Antananarivo	Embassy (Note: Resident in Pretoria, South Africa)	1960	1973	
Malawi	Lilongwe	Embassy (Note: Resident in Nairobi, Kenya)	1964	1997	
Mali	Bamako	Embassy	1960	1972	
Mauritania	Nouakchott	Embassy	1999	2009	
Netherlands	Amsterdam	Embassy	1949	1970	Moved to The Hague
Niger	Niamey	Embassy	1961	1972	
Nigeria	Lagos	Embassy	1960	1973	Moved to Abuja
Oman	Muscat	Commercial Office	1996	2000	
Qatar	Doha	Trade Office	1995	2009	Shortly reopened for the 2022 FIFA World Cup
Sierra Leone	Freetown	Embassy	1961	1973	
Sri Lanka	Colombo	Interests Section (Note: Resident in New Delhi, India)	1983	1990	
Swaziland	Mbabane	Embassy	1968	1996	
Switzerland	Zurich	Consulate-General	1949	1990	
Tanzania	Dar es Salaam	Embassy	1961	1973	
Togo	Lomé	Embassy	1962	1973	
Tunisia	Tunis	Representative Office	1996	2000	
Uganda	Kampala	Embassy	1962	1972	
Upper Volta	Ouagadougou	Embassy	1964	1973	
United States	Dallas	Consulate-General	1960	1972	
United States	Philadelphia	Consulate-General	1964	2015	
Venezuela	Caracas	Embassy	1958	2009	
West Germany	Bonn	Consulate-General	1955	1967	

== See also ==
- List of diplomatic missions in Israel
- Foreign relations of Israel
- Visa policy of Israel
