= Embassy of Israel, Yangon =

Diplomatic mission of the State of Israel in Myanmar

Embassy of Israel, Yangon שגרירות ישראל ביאנגון
- Location: Yangon, Myanmar
- Address: No.15, Khabaung St, Hlaing Township, Yangon
- Coordinates: 16°50′21″N 96°08′01″E
- Ambassador: Hanan Goder - Goldberger
- Jurisdiction: Myanmar
- Website: new.embassies.gov.il/myanmar/en

The Embassy of Israel in Yangon is the diplomatic mission of Israel to Myanmar (formerly Burma). The embassy, established in 1954, was the first Israeli embassy established in Southeast Asia. The current ambassador of Israel to Myanmar is Ambassador Hanan Goder - Goldberger.

== History ==
In November 1953, the Israeli embassy in Burma was opened under the leadership of David Hacohen, who was Israel's first ambassador to the country and held the position until 1955.

In November 1956, Pakistani Muslim demonstrators tried to break into the embassy, as a protest against Israel's support for India during the Indo-Pakistani War of 1965, but were arrested by the local police.

Since this embassy was one of Israel's first embassies in the Southeast Asia region, the Yangon embassy was entrusted to several countries in Southeast Asia for different periods of time. The embassy represented Israel in the Philippines starting from 1957 when relations were first established until 1962 when the Embassy of Israel in Manila was opened. It also represented Israel in Laos from 1956 to 1964, Cambodia from 1959 to 1966, Ceylon starting in 1957, and in the Maldives at some point.

Despite the transfer of the capital of Myanmar from Yangon to Nay Pyi Taw in 2005, most of the diplomatic missions in Myanmar have not moved there, and the embassy is still located in Yangon.

== See also ==
- Israel–Myanmar relations
- Embassy of Myanmar, Tel Aviv
- List of diplomatic missions of Israel
