= Yael Rubinstein =

Israeli diplomat

Ambassador Yael Rubinstein
- יעל רובינשטין
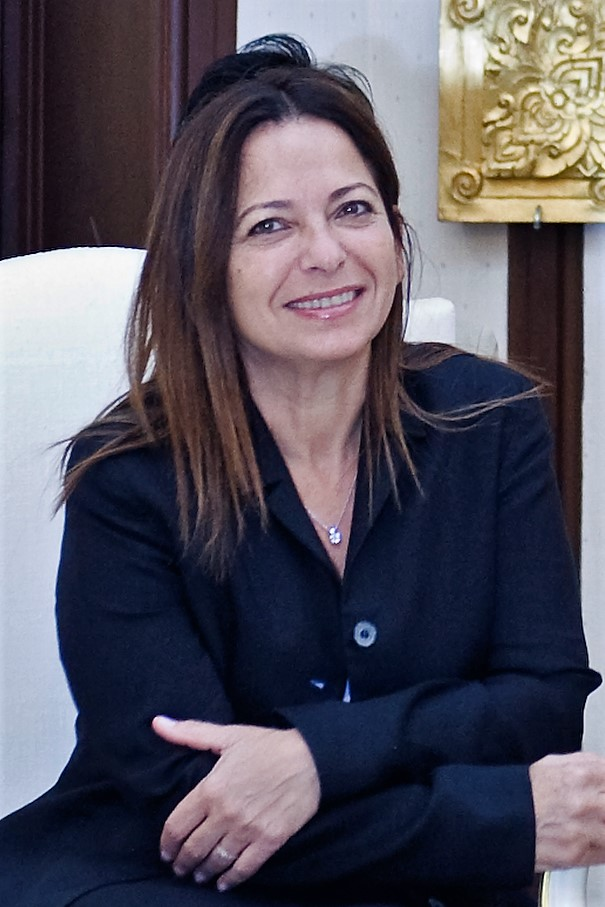
- In office 2013–2017
- Preceded by: Ambassador Amira Arnon
- Succeeded by: Ambassador Simona Halperin

Yael Rubinstein (Hebrew: יעל רובינשטין) is an Israeli diplomat who began her diplomatic career in 2003. Rubinstein was Israel's Ambassador to Singapore from 2013–2017, after having previously served as Ambassador to Thailand and Ambassador to Cambodia.

== Education ==
- BA in Economics and International relations from the Hebrew University of Jerusalem in 1982
- MA in Economics in 1983, Hebrew University of Jerusalem.
- In 2011, she completed an MA in Political Science at Haifa University.

== Diplomatic career ==
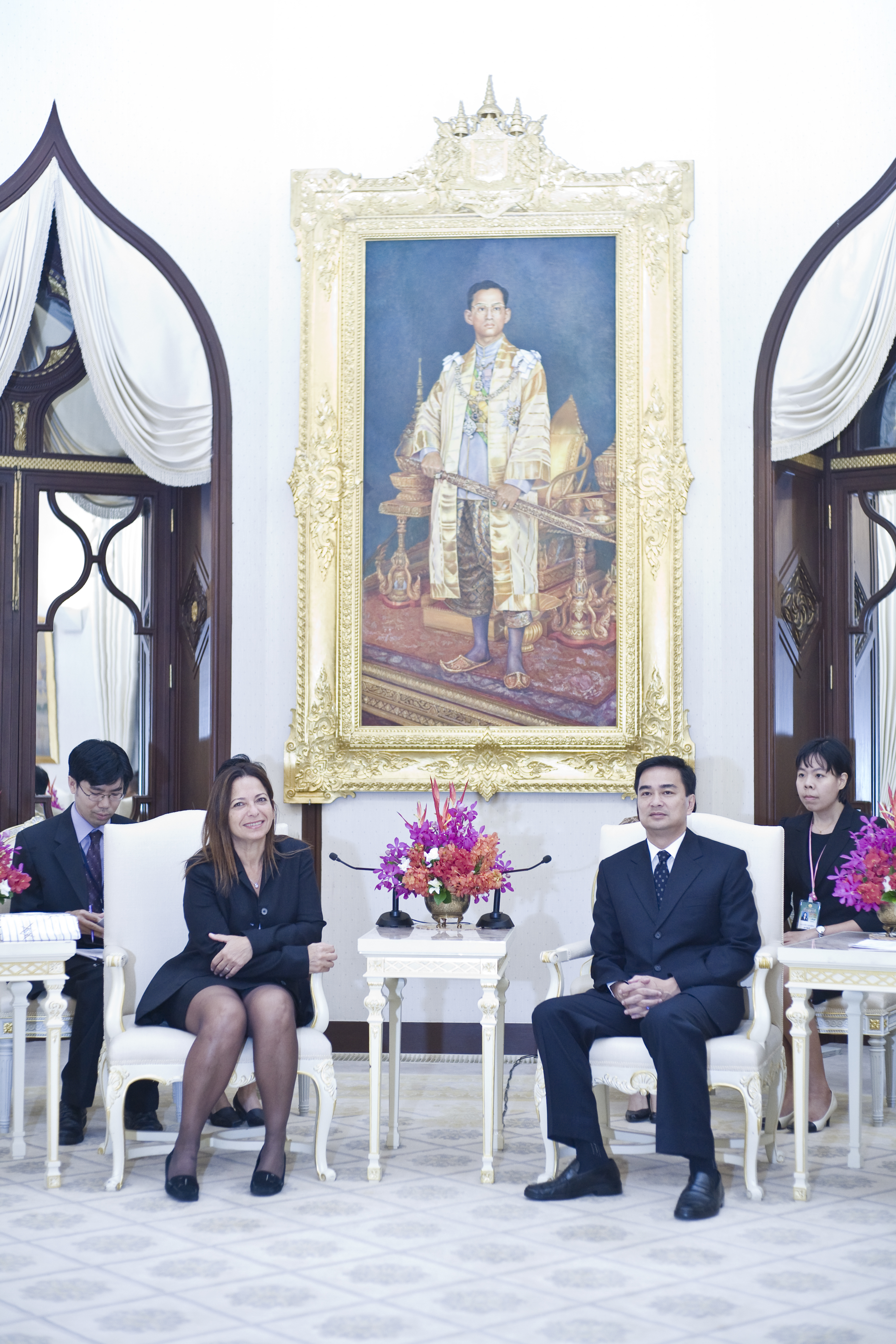
Rubinstein with Prime Minister of Thailand

In 2003, Rubinstein served as Ambassador Extraordinary & Plenipotentiary (non-resident) of Slovakia, Slovenia and Croatia while concurrently serving at the Central Europe Department in the Israeli Ministry of Foreign Affairs.

In 2005–2009, Rubinstein served as Ambassador of Israel to Thailand and Cambodia. In 2008, Rubinstein organized the first performance in Thailand of Zubin Mehta and the Israel Philharmonic Orchestra.

At the Cybertech Singapore conference in February 2017, Ambassador Rubinstein presided over an extensive cyber cooperation agreement between Ben-Gurion University of the Negev and Singapore's Nanyang Technological University. First of its kind Cyber Cooperation Agreement signed between BGU and NTU]

== Personal ==
Rubinstein was born in Israel. She is married to Dan Sherman, a gynecologist and obstetrician. She was married to Ariel Rubinstein. She has two children.

== See also ==
- Women of Israel
- List of Israeli ambassadors
