= List of ambassadors of Israel to Russia =

Coordinates: 55.733611°N 37.623611°E

Ambassador of Israel to Russia Embassy of Israel in Moscow
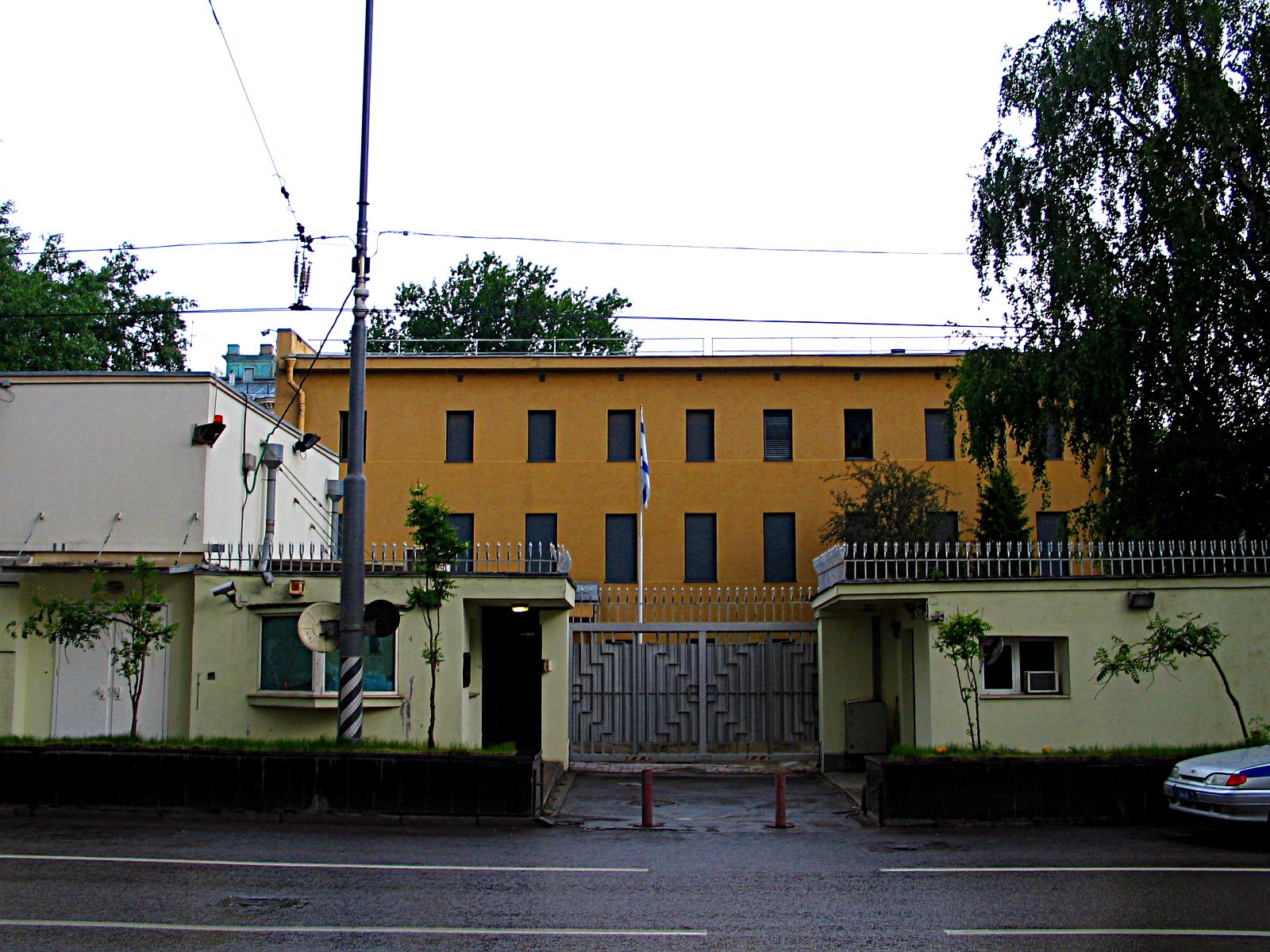
- Incumbent; Simona Halperin since December 2023
- Inaugural holder: Golda Meir
- Formation: September 10, 1948

The Israeli ambassador in Moscow is the official representative of the Government of Israel to the Government of Russia.

When Gary Koren left in 2019, his deputy, Keren Cohen Gat, headed the embassy until Yacov Livne arrived on November 8 as temporary chargé d'affaires.

Simona Halperin became the Ambassador in December 2023.

== List of representatives ==
Diplomatic agrément/Diplomatic accreditation	ambassador	Hebrew language	Observations	Israeli Head of State	Russian Head of State	Term end
September 10, 1948	Golda Meir	he:גולדה מאיר	Golda Meir in Moscow	Chaim Weizmann	Joseph Stalin	1949
1950	Mordechai Namir	he:מרדכי נמיר		Chaim Weizmann	Joseph Stalin	1951
1951	Shmuel Yosef Shalom Elyashiv	he:שמואל אלישיב	Friedman (*October 11, 1899-20 June 1955): He was appointed head of the mission at the pivotal level.; 1952: Slánský trial, Doctors' plot.; On 9 February 1953 an explosion from a bomb, placed by three Lechi activists at The Russian Embassy house in Tel Aviv injured 3 legation employees.; 13 February 1953 The government of Joseph Stalin informed the government ofIsrael of its decision to break off diplomatic relations with Israel.; December 1953 the, after the resumption of relations, he returned to Moscow.; In August 1954, he was promoted to ambassador	Chaim Weizmann	Joseph Stalin	1954
1955	Aluf Joseph Avidar	he:יוסף אבידר	Zvi Ayalon (right) and Yosef Avidar (* May 7, 1906 in Volhynia; 1995) *In 1925 he came to Jerusalem. *From 1925 to 1931 he held a leading position in the Hagana in Jerusalem. *1960-1958 director general of the Ministry of Labor. *From 1961 to 1965 he was ambassador in Buenos Aires.	Yitzhak Ben-Zvi	Nikolai Bulganin	1958
1959	Arie Harel	he:אריה הראל		Yitzhak Ben-Zvi	Nikita Khrushchev	1962
1962	Yosef Tekoah	he:יוסף תקוע		Yitzhak Ben-Zvi	Nikita Khrushchev	1965
1965	Katriel Katz	he:כתריאל כ"ץ		Zalman Shazar	Leonid Brezhnev	1967
June 5, 1967	The Six-Day War ceased the diplomatic relations to the Soviet Union.			Zalman Shazar	Leonid Brezhnev	1991
1991	Aryeh Levin (diplomat)	he:אריה לוין	In 1990 he got Exequatur as Consul General in Moscow. In February 1992 presented his credentials to Boris Yeltsin	Chaim Herzog	Boris Yeltsin	1992
1992	Haim Bar-Lev	he:חיים בר-לב	Died on May 4, 1994, during his term of office	Chaim Herzog	Boris Yeltsin	1994
1994	Aliza Shenhar	he:עליזה שנהר	Aliza Shenhar	Ezer Weizman	Boris Yeltsin	1997
1998	Zvi Magen	he:צבי מגן		Ezer Weizman	Boris Yeltsin	1999
2000	Natan Meron	נתן מירון		Moshe Katsav	Vladimir Putin	2003
2003	Arkady Milman	ארקדי מילמן		Moshe Katsav	Vladimir Putin	2005
2006	Anna Azari	he:אנה אזרי		Moshe Katsav	Vladimir Putin	2010
2010	Dorit Golender	he:דורית גולנדר	Dmitry Medvedev with Dorit Golender	Shimon Peres	Dmitry Medvedev	2015
2015	Zvi Heifetz	he:צבי חפץ		Reuven Rivlin	Vladimir Putin	2017
March 16, 2017	Gary Koren	he:גרי קורן	Gary Koren at the Moscow Kremlin, presenting his credentials as ambassador to Vladimir Putin.	Reuven Rivlin	Vladimir Putin	2020
November 7, 2020	Alexander Ben Zvi	he:אלכסנדר בן צבי		Reuven Rivlin	Vladimir Putin	2023
December 2023	Simona Halperin			Isaac Herzog	Vladimir Putin	current time
