= Austria–Israel relations =

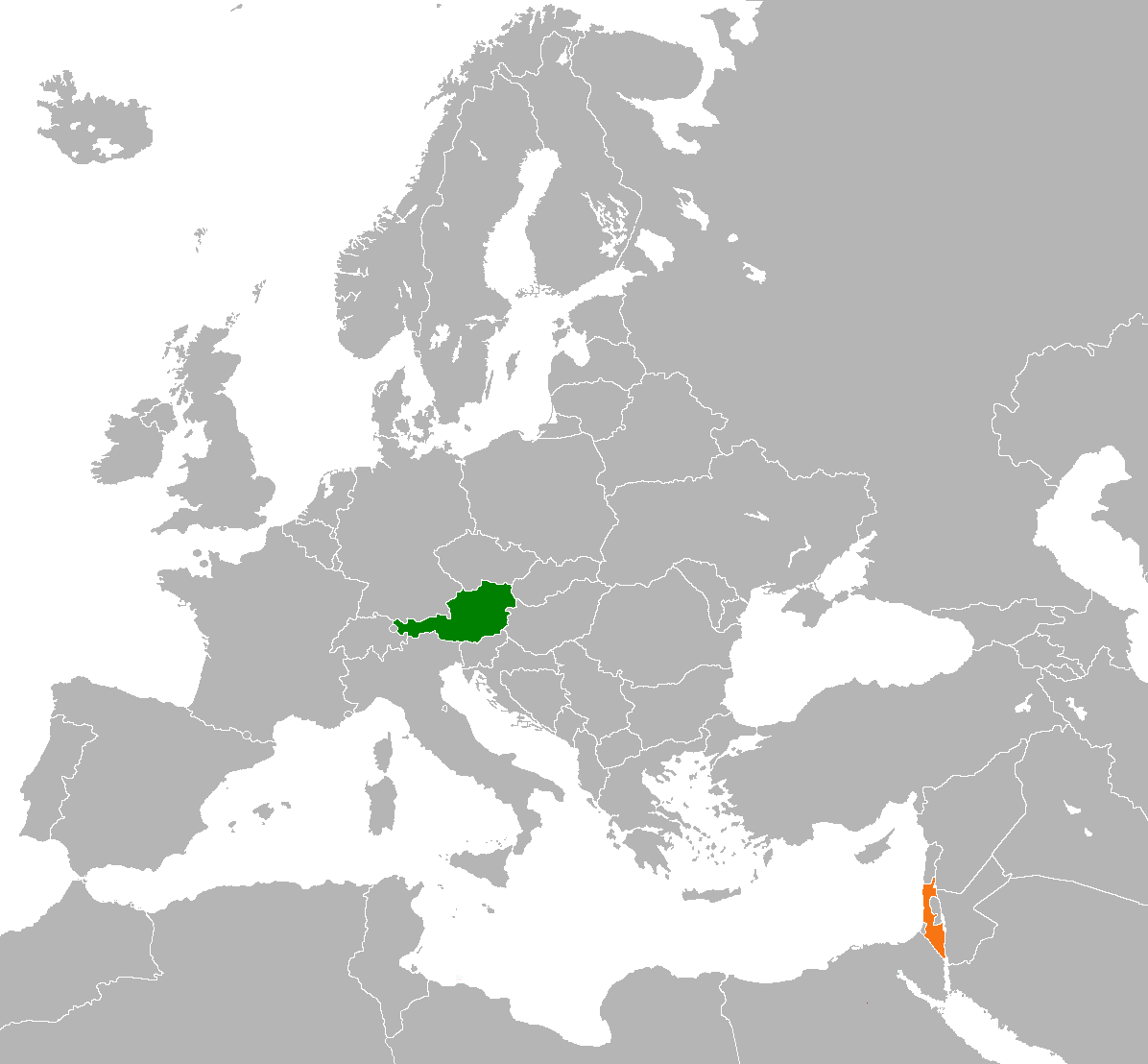
- Austria: Israel

Bilateral foreign relations exist between Austria and Israel. The fact that Adolf Hitler and other perpetrators of The Holocaust came from Austria gives the relationship between the two countries a special relevance. At the same time, the founder of Zionism, Theodor Herzl, also lived in Austria-Hungary and many Israelis are descendants of Austrian Jews. After the founding of Israel, the Second Austrian Republic recognized the Jewish state of Israel shortly after its founding in 1949, before official diplomatic relations were established in 1956. In the 1970s, Bruno Kreisky sought a role as mediator in the Middle East conflict and called for a Palestinian state, which caused disputes with the Israelis. Relations were later strained by the Waldheim affair in the 1980s and the first FPÖ government participation in 2000. After that, the two countries became close allies and established friendly relations. In 2023, Foreign Minister Alexander Schallenberg announced "we have entered into a strategic, extremely close relationship with Israel that can no longer be undone". Within the EU, Austria is considered one of the most pro-Israeli countries.

Austria recognized Israel on March 5, 1949. Austria has an embassy in Tel Aviv and 3 honorary consulates (in Eilat, Haifa and Jerusalem). Israel has an embassy in Vienna. Both countries are full members of the Union for the Mediterranean. The Austrian Foreign Ministry lists the bilateral treaties with Israel (in German only).

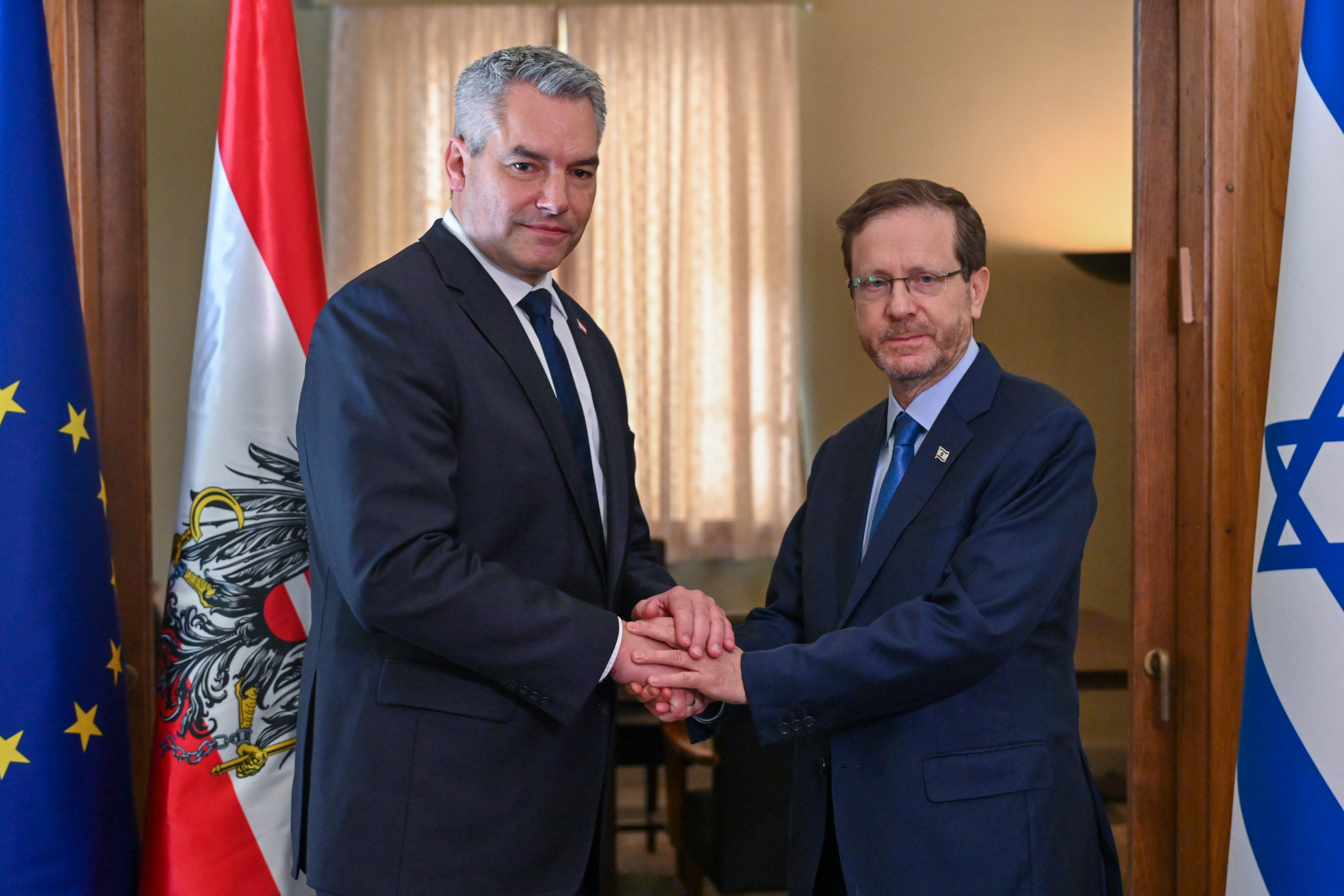
Austrian Chancellor Karl Nehammer with Israeli President Isaac Herzog in Tel Aviv, 25 October 2023

== History ==
=== Background ===
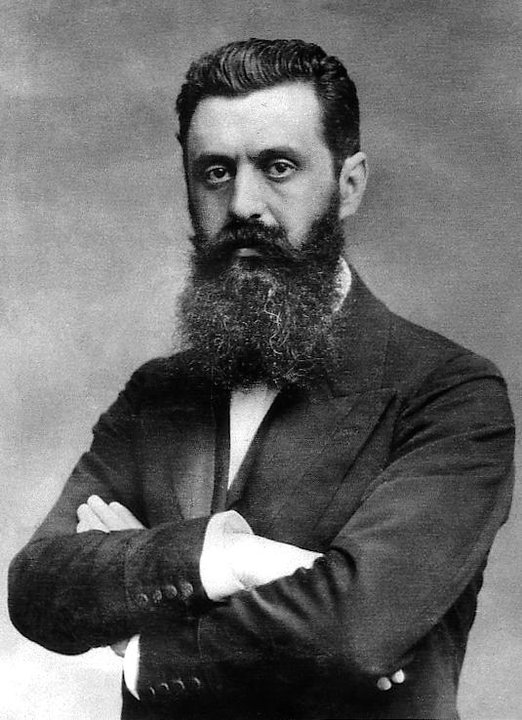
Theodor Herzl

The presence of Jews in Austria can be traced back to Roman times. The first evidence of a Jewish presence in Vienna dates back to the 12th century. However, after a growing Jewish community had formed, the Jews were expelled from the Duchy of Austria by Albrecht V of Habsburg in 1420/21, as he accused them of collaborating with the Hussites. After the Jews returned to Austria, they were repeatedly persecuted, and in 1670 they were once again expelled from Vienna. It was not until Emperor Joseph II issued the Patent of Toleration in 1782 as part of the Josephinian reforms that the situation of the Jewish minority improved and the emancipation of the Jews in the Habsburg Monarchy began. In the 19th century, thanks to the improved legal situation, many Jews achieved social advancement and many of their members began to play a leading role in science, culture and business. In the last Austro-Hungarian census of 1910, the almost two million Jews made up around four percent of the population. Jewish strongholds were large cities such as Vienna, Budapest and Prague as well as Galicia and Bukovina. Anti-Semitism in Austria intensified due to the important role of Jews in national economic life and demagogic politicians such as Karl Lueger polemicized against the Jewish minority, which also influenced Adolf Hitler. In response to the rise of political anti-Semitism, Theodor Herzl published the book The Jewish State, which first appeared in Vienna and Leipzig in 1896 and made a decisive contribution to the emergence of political Zionism. The rise to power of the extreme anti-Semite Hitler in Germany in 1933 and the annexation of Austria to Nazi Germany soon afterwards in 1938 marked a turning point for the Jews of Austria. Of the almost 200,000 Jews in German Austria, around 65,000 died in The Holocaust, while the rest were able to flee in time or go into hiding. A large proportion of the Jews in the former Habsburg territories of Central and Eastern Europe also died as a result of the German extermination policy. The survivors then played a decisive role in the establishment of a Jewish state in the Palestine region.

=== After the founding of Israel ===
After the Israeli declaration of independence on 14 May 1948, Austria recognized the new state in March 1949 and in the same year Austria granted Israel a loan of 50 million shillings and transferred the mortal remains of Theodor Herzl to Israel. The State of Israel largely adopted the position of the Allied Western Powers, who regarded Austria as the first victim of the Nazis. Austria was exempted from the confiscation of German property in the former League of Nations Mandate for Palestine. This laid the foundation for the subsequent establishment of consular relations between the two countries and the de jure recognition of Israel by Austria in the spring of 1950, although mutual confirmation of this did not take place until two years later. Prior to this, there were negotiations about Austrian reparations to Israel for the crimes of the Second World War. The two sides finally reached an agreement in September 1952 and Israel waived all claims in return for a further trade credit of 100 million schillings. Subsequently, negotiations between the Austrian state and the Jewish Committee for Claims on Austria were initiated regarding compensation for persecuted and expropriated Austrian Jews and the persecution of the perpetrators. The negotiations lasted almost three years and were concluded in July 1955. Shortly before this, Austria had committed itself to foreign policy neutrality in the Austrian State Treaty and regained its sovereignty. Israel recognized this and on February 2, 1956, the Austrian Government announced the establishment of diplomatic relations with Israel.

Relations subsequently developed positively and during the Suez Crisis, Austria took a pro-Israel stance in the UN General Assembly. In 1958, it signed a trade agreement with Israel. A short time later, the arrest of Adolf Eichmann in Buenos Aires, a Nazi who had grown up in Austria, led to the Eichmann trials, which began in 1961 and attracted a great deal of attention throughout the German-speaking world and beyond. At the end of the 1960s, Austria, which was neutral during the Cold War, acted as a hub for the emigration of 270,000 Jews from the Soviet Union to Israel. In September 1973, two Arab terrorists took four Jewish emigrants hostage, and Austrian Chancellor Bruno Kreisky was able to secure the release of the hostages in return for the closure of the transit camp in Schönau an der Triesting. This decision led to criticism from Israeli and US diplomats and strained relations with Israel, although Austria subsequently continued to act as a transit country for Jewish emigrants from the Eastern Bloc. In 1975, Kreisky also spoke out in favour of the establishment of a State of Palestine as part of a mission by the Socialist International, while at the same time explicitly recognizing Israel's right to exist. Although Kreisky emphasized his own Jewish origins, the Israelis regarded him with suspicion.

After the election of Likud and Menachem Begin in 1977, relations deteriorated further and Begin and Kreisky engaged in a public dispute in which Kreisky described Israel as a "police state". An attempt at mediation between Egypt and Israel by Willy Brandt and Kreisky in 1978 was blocked by the Israelis and after Kreisky organized a meeting between Brandt and Palestinian leader Yasser Arafat in July 1979, he was compared to Hitler by the Jewish Telegraphic Agency and condemned by Begin in the Knesset. After Austria became the first Western state to recognize the Palestine Liberation Organization (PLO) in March 1980, the low point was reached. After the resignation of Kreisky as Austrian Federal Chancellor, relations improved briefly until the election of Kurt Waldheim as Austrian President. Waldheim was accused of war crimes during the Nazi era, which led to the Waldheim Affair. Diplomatic relations were therefore downgraded until 1992. After Waldheimer's departure and the election of Yitzchak Rabin as Prime Minister of Israel, relations finally relaxed again. In 1993, Austrian Chancellor Franz Vranitzky visited Israel and gave a historic speech at the Hebrew University of Jerusalem in which he acknowledged Austria's responsibility for the Holocaust. In November 1994, President Thomas Klestil became the first Austrian president to visit Israel; in a speech before the Knesset, he said Austria had too often emphasized its loss of independence under Nazism and too rarely acknowledged that some of the worst Nazi perpetrators had been Austrians.

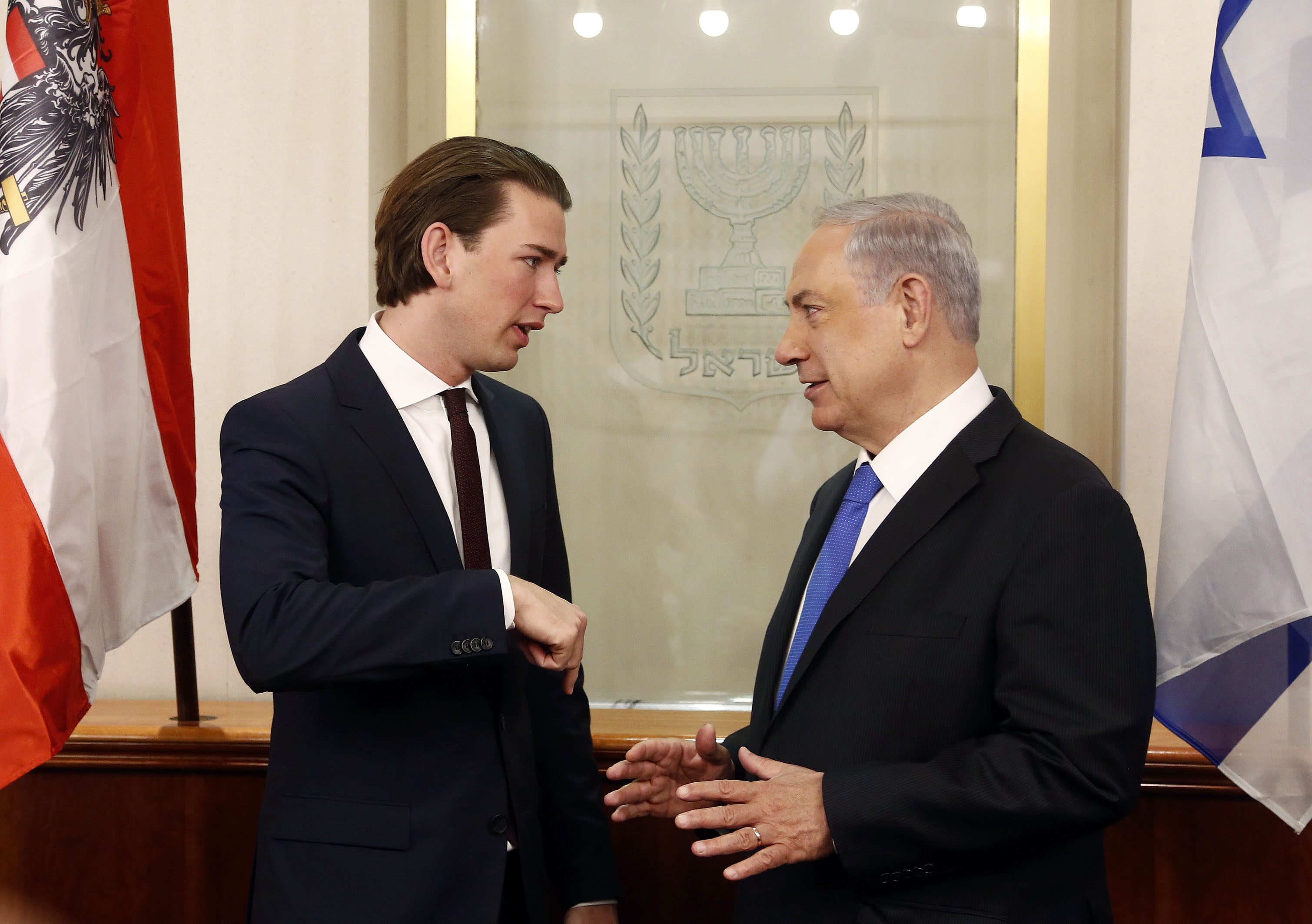
Sebastian Kurz and Benjamin Netanyahu (2014)

After the 1999 Austrian legislative election, the Freedom Party of Austria (FPÖ) joined the coalition government in 2000, Israel recalled its ambassador. After talks in Jerusalem with the Austrian foreign minister, Benita Ferrero-Waldner in 2003, relations were restored. The FPÖ returned to government in 2017 under the government of Sebastian Kurz, but presented itself as Friend of Israel. Chancellor Kurz visited Jerusalem in 2018 and met with Benjamin Netanyahu. He announced that he would make the fight against anti-Semitism the focus of Austria's EU Council Presidency and was described by Netanyahu during the visit as a "true friend of Israel and the Jewish people" Even after the end of Kurz's chancellorship, relations with Israel remained close, and a strategic partnership was concluded in 2022. After Hamas-led attack on Israel in 2023, Austria stopped all aid to Palestine. In both October and December 2023, Austria voted against a resolution for a ceasefire in the Gaza War.

== Economic relations ==
Economic relations between the two countries have been significantly expanded as political relations have intensified. Between 2018 and 2022, Austria's exports to Israel increased by 50 percent. In 2023, Austria's total exports amounted to 540 million euros and imports from Israel to 339 million euros. Pharmaceutical products were the largest asset in trade with Israel, but machinery, vehicles and special instruments were also traded. Israeli tourists were responsible for one million overnight stays in Austria in 2023, putting them in 14th place in the tourist statistics, which is remarkable considering Israel's small size.

Austria - Israel trade in millions USD-$
	Israel imports Austria exports	Austria imports Israel exports	Total trade value
2023	602.7	102.1	704.8
2022	726.5	114.4	840.9
2021	666	107.7	773.7
2020	609.6	76.3	685.9
2019	530.6	73.5	604.1
2018	545.5	79	624.5
2017	532.9	63.2	596.1
2016	408.9	67.4	476.3
2015	408.1	73.3	481.4
2014	413.3	93.1	506.4
2013	335.5	88	423.5
2012	310.6	122.7	433.3
2011	347.6	181.2	528.8
2010	263.3	155.4	418.7
2009	267.3	99.9	367.2
2008	399.2	99.9	499.1
2007	297.1	118.5	415.6
2006	215	84.6	299.6
2005	202.9	80.5	283.4
2004	203.8	83.8	287.6
2003	153.8	68.3	222.1
2002	128.2	74.3	202.5

== Ambassadors of Israel to Austria ==
- Zvi Heifetz
- Aviv Shir-On
- Dan Ashbel
- Avigdor Dagan
- Natan Peled
- Vincent Ackermans

== Diplomatic missions ==
Republic of Austria

- Tel Aviv (Embassy)

State of Israel

- Vienna (Embassy)

== See also ==
- Foreign relations of Austria
- Foreign relations of Israel
- Austria–Palestine relations
- International recognition of Israel
- Jewish Museum Vienna
