= Boaz Rodkin =

Israeli diplomat

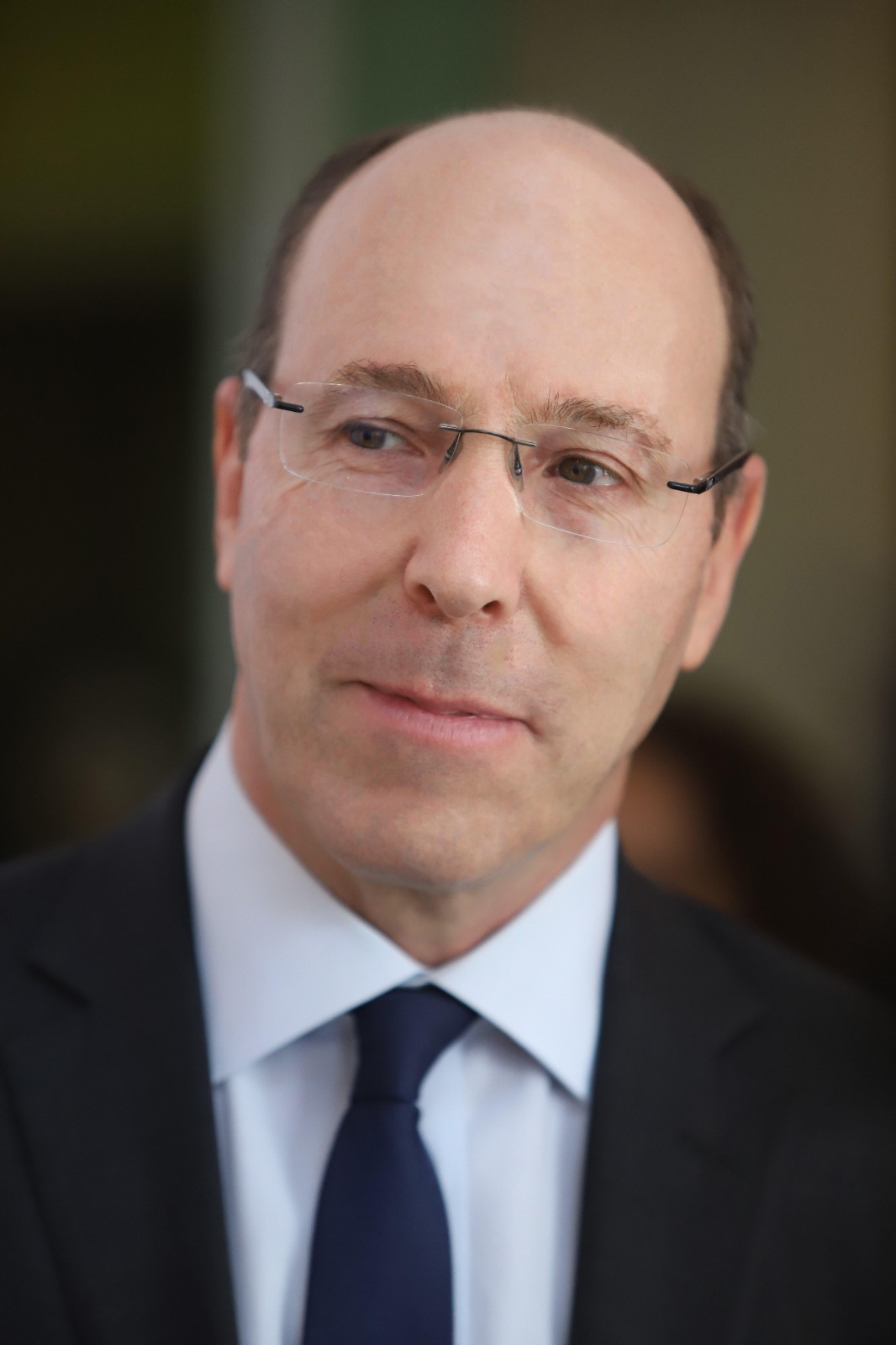
- Rodkin in 2018

Israel Ambassador to Finland
- Incumbent
- Assumed office 2024

Israel Ambassador to Bosnia and Herzegovina
- In office 2019–2024

Israel Ambassador to Albania
- In office 2016–2019

Personal details
- Born: Haifa, Israel
- Children: 3
- Education: B.A., Hebrew University of Jerusalem; M.A., Tel Aviv University
- Occupation: Diplomat

Boaz Rodkin is Ambassador of Israel to Finland. He was the Ambassador of Israel to Albania from April 2015 until 2019 and the non-resident Ambassador to Bosnia and Herzegovina since 2016.

== Early life ==
Rodkin, born and raised in Haifa, graduated from the Hebrew University of Jerusalem with a bachelor’s degree in International Relations, and earned a Master's degree in Public Policy from Tel Aviv University.

== Ambassador to Albania ==
Rodkin was involved in what has been described as helping “to establish the ground-breaking scheduled direct flights between Tel Aviv and Tirana, bringing a record-breaking number of Israeli tourists to the Western Balkan country.”
