= Elżbieta Kossewska =

Polish political scientist and cultural studies scholar

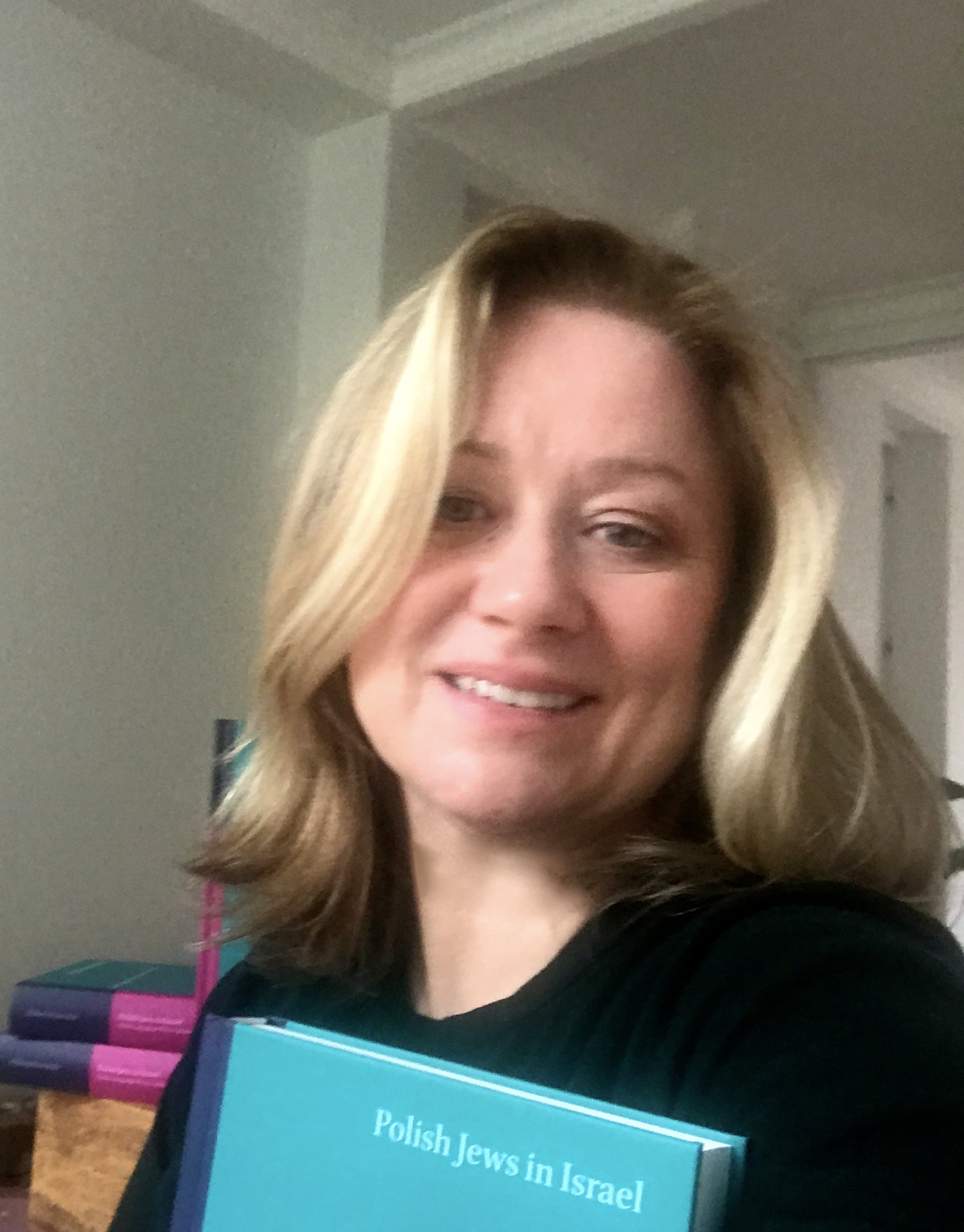
Elżbieta Kossewska, 2021

Elżbieta Kossewska is a Polish scholar culturologist, habilitated doctor, university professor at the Faculty of Political Science and International Studies of the University of Warsaw, head of the Professor Shevah Weiss Center for the Study of Israel and the Jewish Diaspora at the faculty. Her interests include history of Polish Jews in Israel, the history of Polish emigration after World War II, the cultural and literary heritage of Polish emigration, political problems related to emigration and exile, Polish-Israeli diplomatic relations.

== Books ==
- Elżbieta Kossewska, Polish Jews in Israel: Polish-Language Press, Culture, and Politics, Brill, Boston 2021.
- Elżbieta Kossewska, Marc Chagall – Dawid Lazer. Listy, Warsaw 2018
- Elżbieta Kossewska, Ona jeszcze mówi po polsku, ale śmieje się po hebrajsku. Partyjna prasa polskojęzyczna i integracja kulturowa polskich Żydów w Izraelu (1948–1970), Warsaw 2015
- Brzemię pamięci. Współczesne stosunki polsko-izraelskie, ed. E. Kossewska, Warsaw 2009
- Elżbieta Kossewska, Związek Legionistów Polskich, Warsaw 2003
- Piłsudski na łamach i w opiniach prasy polskiej 1918–1939, eds. M.Jabłonowski, E. Kossewska, Warsaw 2005
