= List of ambassadors of Israel to Singapore =

This is a list of ambassadors of Israel to Singapore.

== Ambassadors ==
- Hagai Dikan 1969 - 1971
- Tzvi Kedar 1971 - 1973
- Yhosha Almog 1973 - 1976
- Itzhak Navon 1976 - 1978
- Nahum Eshkol 1978
- Moshe Ben-Yaacov 1983 - 1987
- Israel Eliashiv 1987 - 1990
- Banad Avital 1991 - 1992
- Danny Megido 1992 - 1998
- David Danieli 1998 - 2001
- Itzhak Shoham 2001 - 2005
- Ilan Ben-Dov 2005 - 2009
- Amira Arnon 2009 - 2013
- Yael Rubinstein 2013 - 2017
- Simona Halperin 2017 - 2019
- Sagi Karni 2019 - 2023
- Eli Vered Hazan 2023 - 2026
- Yahel Vilan 2026 - present
