= List of ambassadors of Israel to Poland =

Ambassador of Israel to Poland
- Coat of Arms of Israel
- Incumbent; Yacov Livne since 2019
- Nominator: Prime Minister of Israel
- Inaugural holder: Israel Barzilay
- Formation: 1948

== List of ambassadors ==
Israel's past and current ambassadors to Poland:

- Yacov Livne since 2021
- Alexander Ben-Zvi 2019-2021
- Anna Azari 2014 - 2019
- Zvi Rav-Ner 2009 - 2014
- David Peleg 2004 - 2009
- Shevah Weiss 2001 - 2004
- Yigal Antebi (diplomat) 1997 - 2001
- Gershon Zohar 1993 - 1997
- Miron Gordon 1990 - 1993
- Mordechai David Palzur, 1986 - 1990
- Dov Sattath 1964 - 1967
- Ambassador Avigdor Dagan 1961 - 1964
- Minister Rehavam Amir 1958 - 1961
- Minister Katriel Katz 1956 - 1958
- Minister Aryeh Leon Kubovy (Non-Resident, Prague) 1951 - 1952
- Minister Yisrael Barzilai 1948 - 1951
