= List of ambassadors of Israel to Bosnia and Herzegovina =

== List of ambassadors ==
- Noah Gal Gendler 2019-
- Boaz Rodkin (Non-Resident, Tirana) 2016 - 2019
- David Cohen (diplomat) (Non-Resident, Tirana) 2012 - 2015
- Amira Arnon (Non-Resident, Jerusalem) 2007 - 2009
- Irit Ben-Abba (Non-Resident, Jerusalem) 2004 - 2006
- Judith Varnai-Shorer,
