= Zvi Heifetz =

Israeli diplomat

- צבי חפץ
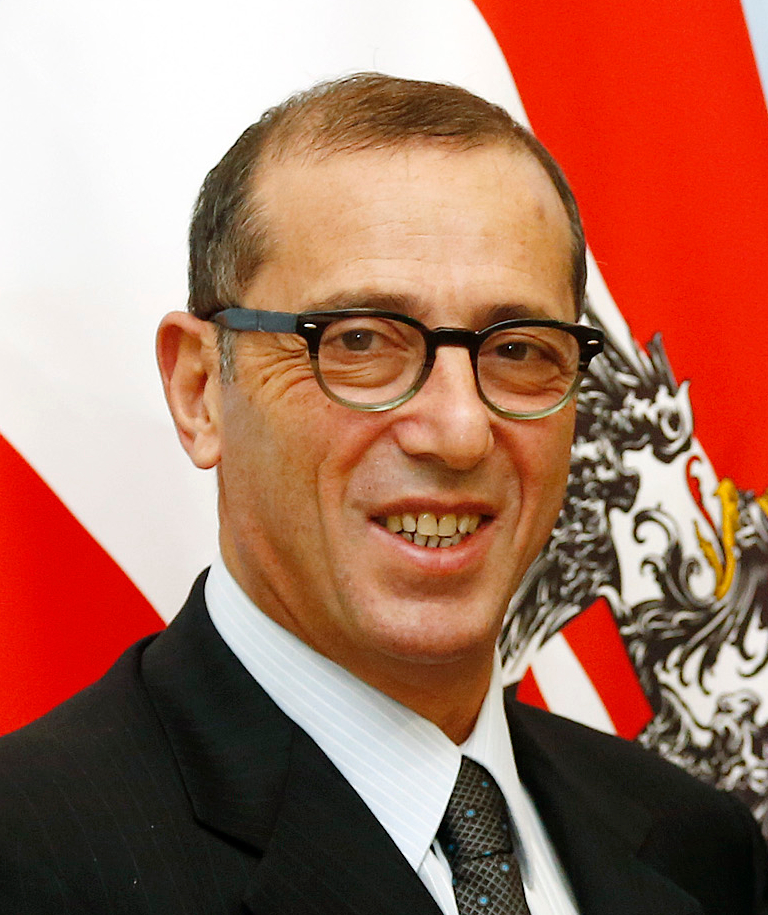
- Heifetz in 2014

8th Israeli Ambassador to China
- In office 2017–2020
- Preceded by: Matan Vilnai
- Succeeded by: Irit Ben-Abba

Israeli Ambassador to Russia
- In office 2015–2017
- Preceded by: Dorit Golender
- Succeeded by: Gary Koren

Israeli Ambassador to Austria
- In office 2013–2015

14th Israeli Ambassador to the United Kingdom
- In office 2004–2007
- Preceded by: Zvi Stauber
- Succeeded by: Ron Prosor

Personal details
- Born: 9 December 1956 (age 69) Tomsk, Russian SFSR, Soviet Union
- Education: Tel Aviv University

Military service
- Allegiance: Israel
- Branch/service: Israeli Army
- Rank: Major

Zvi Heifetz (born December 9, 1956) is an Israeli diplomat who served as the Israeli Ambassador to China. He has previously served as the ambassador to the United Kingdom (from 2004 to 2007), the ambassador to Austria (from 2013 to 2015), and the ambassador to Russia (from 2015 to 2017).

Born in Tomsk, Russian SFSR, Heifetz moved to Israel at the age of 14. He spent 7 years with Israel Intelligence and completed as a major in the Israeli Army. He has a Law degree from the Tel Aviv University and is a member of the Israeli Bar.

Heifetz became the vice-chairman of the Maariv Group in 1999 and chairman of both the Hed-Arzi Music Production Company and Tower Records, Israel in 2001.

In 1989 Heiftetz served as one of the first Israeli diplomats at the Dutch Embassy in Moscow, and in 1997 he worked as an external legal adviser to the Prime Minister's Office ("Nativ") on matters relating to the former Soviet Union. Since 2003 Heifetz has acted as an adviser and spokesman for the Ministry of Defence dealing with the Russian-language media.

He was appointed to be the special envoy to the Gulf States in 2021, making him responsible for the establishment of two embassies, Abu Dhabi and Manama.
