= Anna Azari =

Israeli diplomat

- אנה עזרי
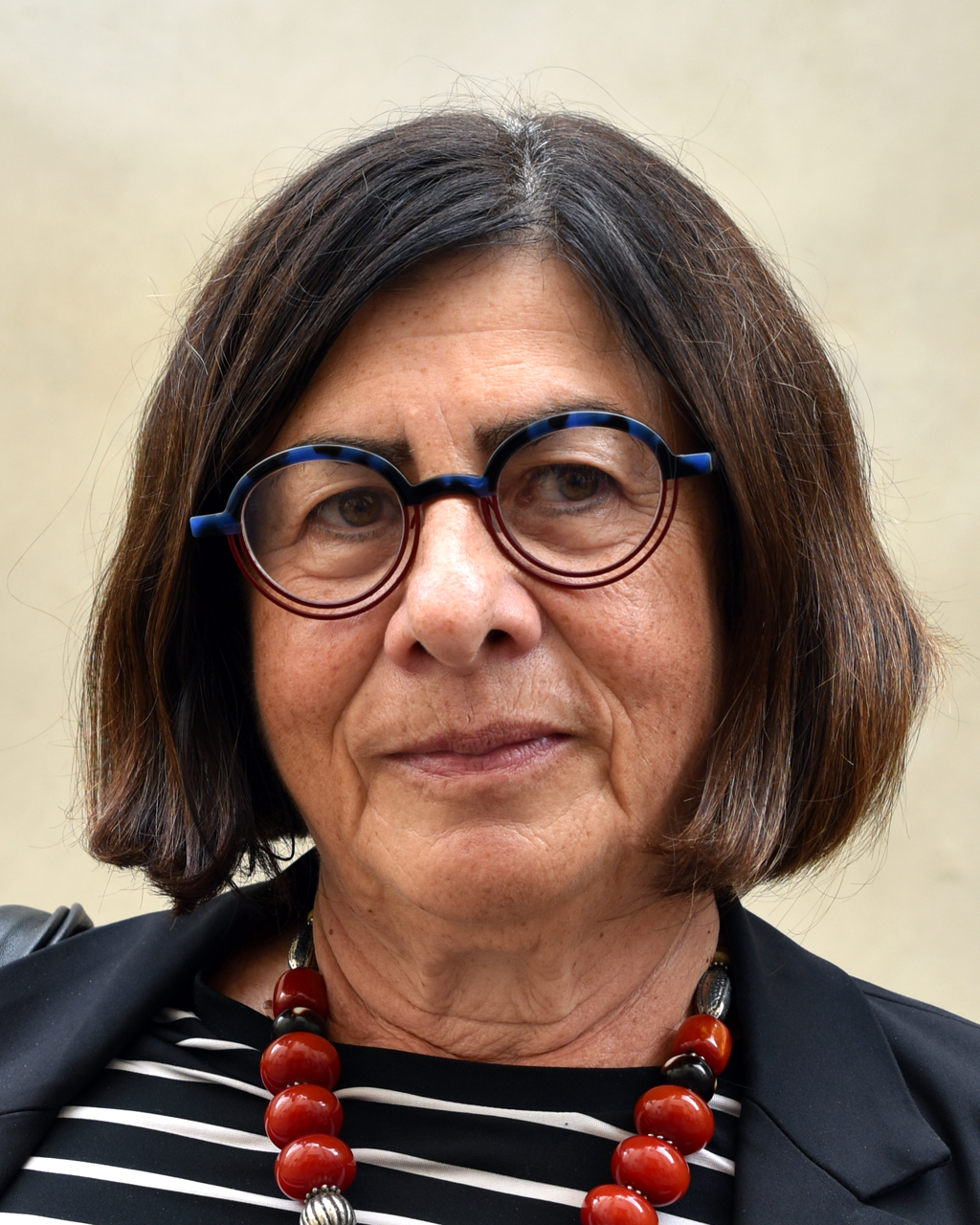

Israeli Ambassador to Ukraine and Moldova
- In office 1999–2003
- Succeeded by: Naomi Ben-Ami

Israeli Ambassador to Russia
- In office 2007–2010
- Preceded by: Arkady Milman
- Succeeded by: Dorit Golender

Israel Ambassador to Poland
- In office September 2014 – 2019
- Preceded by: Zvi Rav-Ner
- Succeeded by: Aleksander Ben Cewi

Israel Ambassador to the Czech Republic
- Incumbent
- Assumed office August 2021
- Preceded by: Daniel Meron

Personal details
- Born: 27 August 1959 (age 67) Vilnius, Lithuanian SSR
- Education: University of Haifa; Hebrew University; National Security College
- Profession: Diplomat

Anna Azari (Hebrew: אנה עזרי; born 27 August 1959) is an Israeli diplomat, and the current Ambassador of Israel to the Czech Republic. She has previously been Israel's Ambassador to Russia (2006–2010) and Poland (2014–2019).

== Early life and education ==
She was born in Vilnius, Lithuanian Soviet Socialist Republic in 1959 and emigrated to Israel with her family in 1972. Azari attended the University of Haifa, earning a bachelor's degree in history and English literature and a master's in political science. She also garnered a Special Program in Russian Studies from Hebrew University and graduated from the National Security College.

== Career ==
She has been in the Israeli Foreign Service since the 1980s, and lived in San Francisco from 1989 to 1992, serving as consul-general of Israel to the Pacific Northwest.

From 1995 to 1997 Azari was first secretary at the Embassy of Israel in Moscow. Beginning in 1999, she served as Ambassador of Israel to both Ukraine and Moldova and, before leaving the post in 2003, was described in the Ukrainian press as one of the country's most popular foreign diplomats.

On the day of the September 11 attacks, Azari was meeting with a delegation of physicians from Chicago and Atlanta-based Jewish Healthcare International to discuss their collaborative work with Ukrainian health professionals. The meeting was interrupted when they learned of the attacks and they watched news coverage of the attacks in the meeting room until the embassy was ordered to be evacuated. Following her tenure in Ukraine, Azari ran the Ministry's Eurasia Department where she handled relations with former Soviet states. During this time she was considered to be one of several candidates that Prime Minister Ariel Sharon could choose to appoint as head of Nativ.

She was appointed as ambassador to Russia by Foreign Minister Tzipi Livni in 2006 and presented her credentials to Russian president Vladimir Putin on 18 January 2007. Over the course of her tenure, Israel and Russia agreed to eliminate the visa requirement for tourists traveling between the two countries and Russia ended a deal to sell Iran S-300 surface-to-air missiles. Dorit Golander was chosen to replace Azari in 2009 and she left the post in the summer of 2010. In an interview with Rossiyskaya Gazeta prior to her departure, Azari stated that relations between Israel and Russia had improved markedly and that she saw the level of diplomatic activity nearing a par with Russia's relations with bigger countries, such as Germany.

== Personal life ==
Azari is married to Rabbi Meir Azari who leads the Reform Judaism congregation of Beit Daniel in Tel Aviv and together they have two children. When her appointment as ambassador to Russia was announced, Greer Fay Cashman of The Jerusalem Post suggested her marriage could be a source of contention with orthodox religious communities in Russia.
