= Irit Ben-Abba =

Israeli diplomat

- אירית בן-אבא
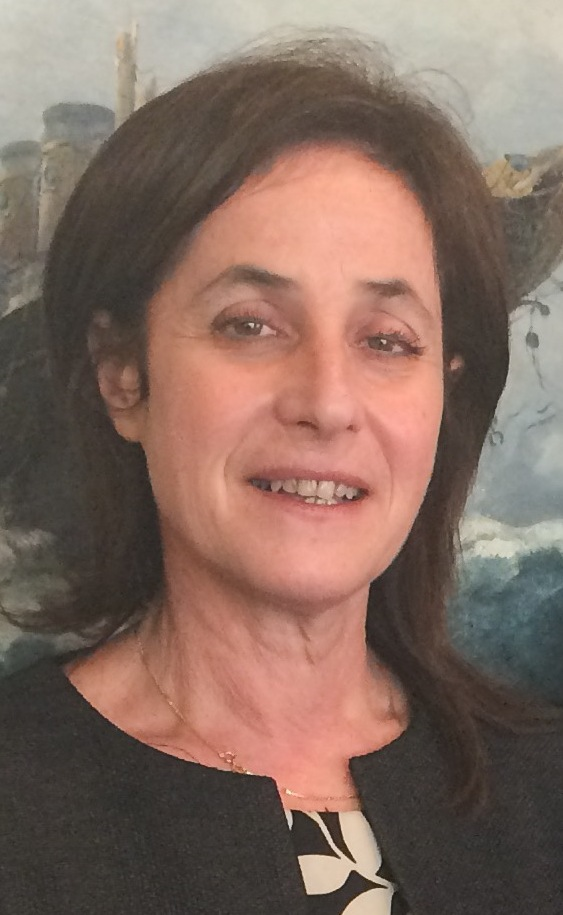

9th Israeli Ambassador to China
- Incumbent
- Assumed office 22 February 2021
- Prime Minister: Benjamin Netanyahu; Naftali Bennett; Yair Lapid
- Preceded by: Zvi Heifetz

Personal details
- Born: 1958 (age 67–68) Tel Aviv, Israel
- Occupation: Diplomat

Irit Ben-Abba Vitali (Hebrew: אירית בן-אבא; born 1958) is the current Israeli ambassador to China and non-resident ambassador to Mongolia since 2021.

== Education ==
Between 1979-1982 Ben-Abba studied at and graduated cum laude from the Hebrew University of Jerusalem, majoring in East Asian Studies and English Linguistics.

Between 2003-2005 Ben-Abba did executive MBA studies at the Hebrew University.

== Career ==
Ben-Abba has served as Ambassador to Albania from 2004 until 2006 (concurrent with Bosnia and Herzegovina, Greece (2014-2019), North Macedonia (2004-2006) and the Philippines (2000-2004). She is the current Israeli Ambassador to China, having arrived to Beijing on 22 February 2021. She was also Deputy Director General of Economic Affairs at the Ministry of Foreign Affairs.
