= List of ambassadors of Israel to China =

Coordinates: 40.073275°N 116.561860°E

Ambassador of Israel to China
- Incumbent; Eli Belotsercovsky since June 2025
- Inaugural holder: Zev Sufott
- Formation: January 1992

The ambassador of Israel to China is the representative of the State of Israel in the People's Republic of China.

== Background ==
Israel was the first country in the Middle East to recognize the PRC as the legitimate government of China. However, China did not establish normal diplomatic relations with Israel until 1992. Since then, Israel and China have developed increasingly close strategic economic, military and technological links with each other. Israel maintains an embassy in Beijing and consulates in Shanghai, Guangzhou, Chengdu and Hong Kong.

== List of representatives ==
- Zev Sufott (זאב סופות) (1992-1993)
- Moshe Ben-Yaacov (משה בן-יעקב) (1993-1996)
- Ora Namir (אורה נמיר) (1996-2000)
- Itzhak Shelef (יצחק שלף) (2000-2002)
- Yehoyada Haim (יהוידע חיים) (2002-2007)
- Amos Nadai (עמוס נדאי) (2007-2011)
- Matan Vilnai (מתן וילנאי) (2011-2017)
- Zvi Heifetz (2017-2021)
- Irit Ben-Abba (2021-2025)
- Eli Belotsercovsky (2025-present)

== See also ==
- China–Israel relations
