= Shevah Weiss =

Israeli politician (1935–2023)

- שבח וייס
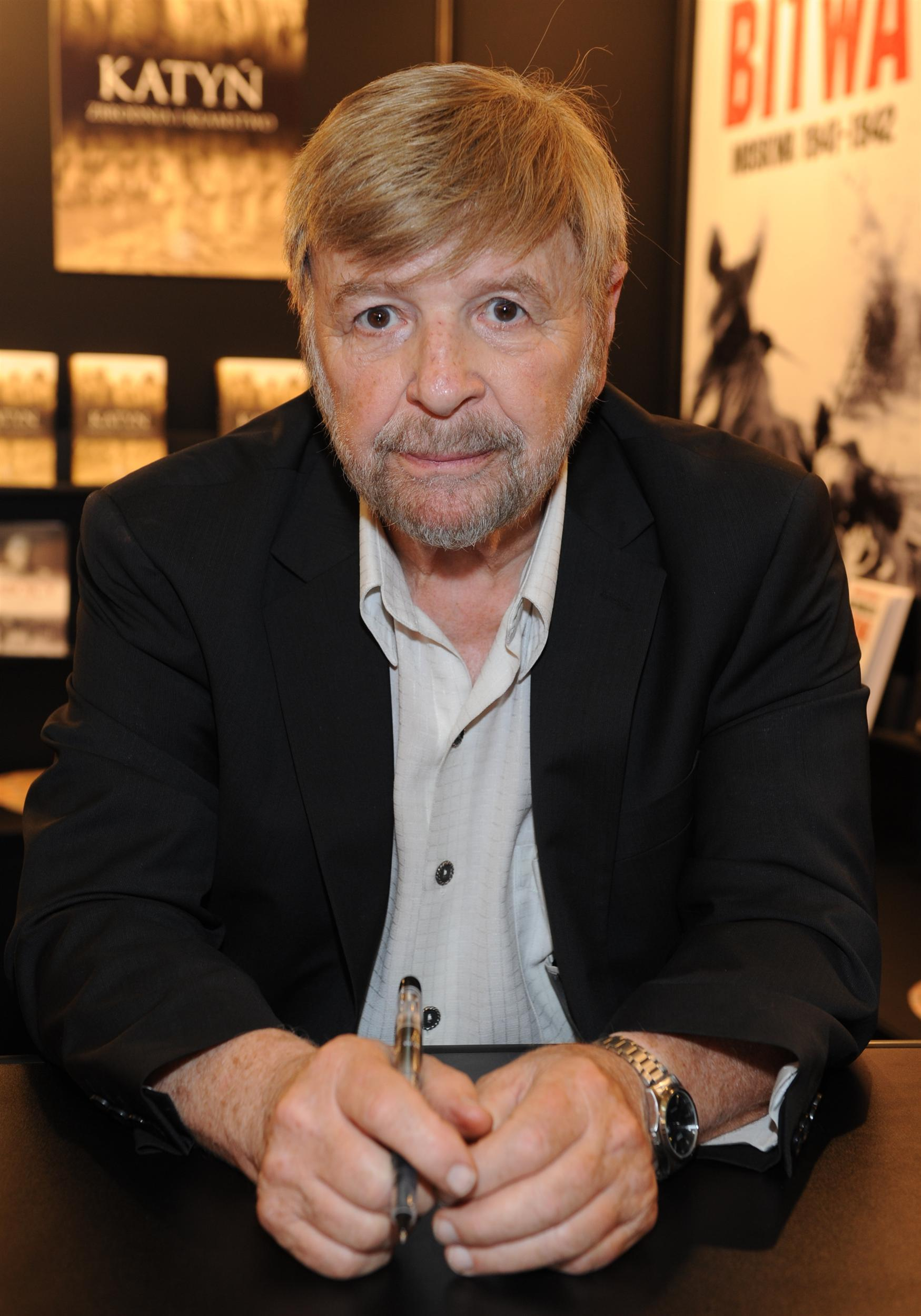
- Weiss in 2008

Speaker of the Knesset
- In office 13 July 1992 – 24 June 1996
- Preceded by: Dov Shilansky
- Succeeded by: Dan Tichon

Faction represented in the Knesset
- 1981–1991: Alignment
- 1991–1999: Labor Party

Diplomatic roles
- 2001–2003: Ambassador to Poland

Personal details
- Born: Szeivah Weiss; 5 July 1935 Borysław, Poland
- Died: 3 February 2023 (aged 87) Tel Aviv, Israel
- Spouse: Ester Weiss
- Children: 2
- Education: Hebrew University of Jerusalem, University of Warsaw
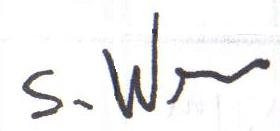
- Signature

Shevah Weiss (Hebrew: שבח וייס; 5 July 1935 – 3 February 2023) was an Israeli politician who served as Knesset Speaker under Yitzhak Rabin. He was Israel's ambassador to Poland and chairman of Yad Vashem.

== Biography ==
Shevah Weiss was born in Borysław, Poland to Gienia and Meir Wolf Weiss. During the Holocaust, his father built a hiding place for the family behind the wall of their store. He built bunk beds, one on top of the other, up to the ceiling. Weiss lived in this tiny space with his parents, sister, brother, aunt, uncle, cousin and neighbor. Later they lived in the basement of a children’s orphanage. Neighbors provided them with food and water. Weiss recalls: "My father cooked a soup consisting of one potato and water for our whole group. But in the end, we were reduced to chewing book covers made of genuine leather." Weiss later expressed his gratitude to the families who saved him, whom he described as “amazing people, my heroes…[who] will always be in my heart”.

Weiss immigrated to Palestine in 1947. He graduated from the Hebrew University of Jerusalem with a BA in International Relations in 1961. He went on to earn an MA in Political Science and contemporary Jewish studies and a PhD.

Weiss was married to Esther, with whom he had two children. Dr. Esther Weiss died of cancer in 2005.

== Academic career ==
In 1975, Weiss became a professor at the University of Haifa.

Shevach Weiss was a lecturer at the Faculty of Political Science and International Studies at the University of Warsaw. In 2008, Prof. Shevach Weiss and Prof. Elżbieta Kossewska established the Center for Research on Israel and the Jewish Diaspora at this Faculty. After Shevach Weiss's death, in honor of his memory, by decision of the University Authorities, the Center changed its name to the Shevah Weiss Center for Research on Israel and the Jewish Diaspora.

== Political, civic and diplomatic career ==
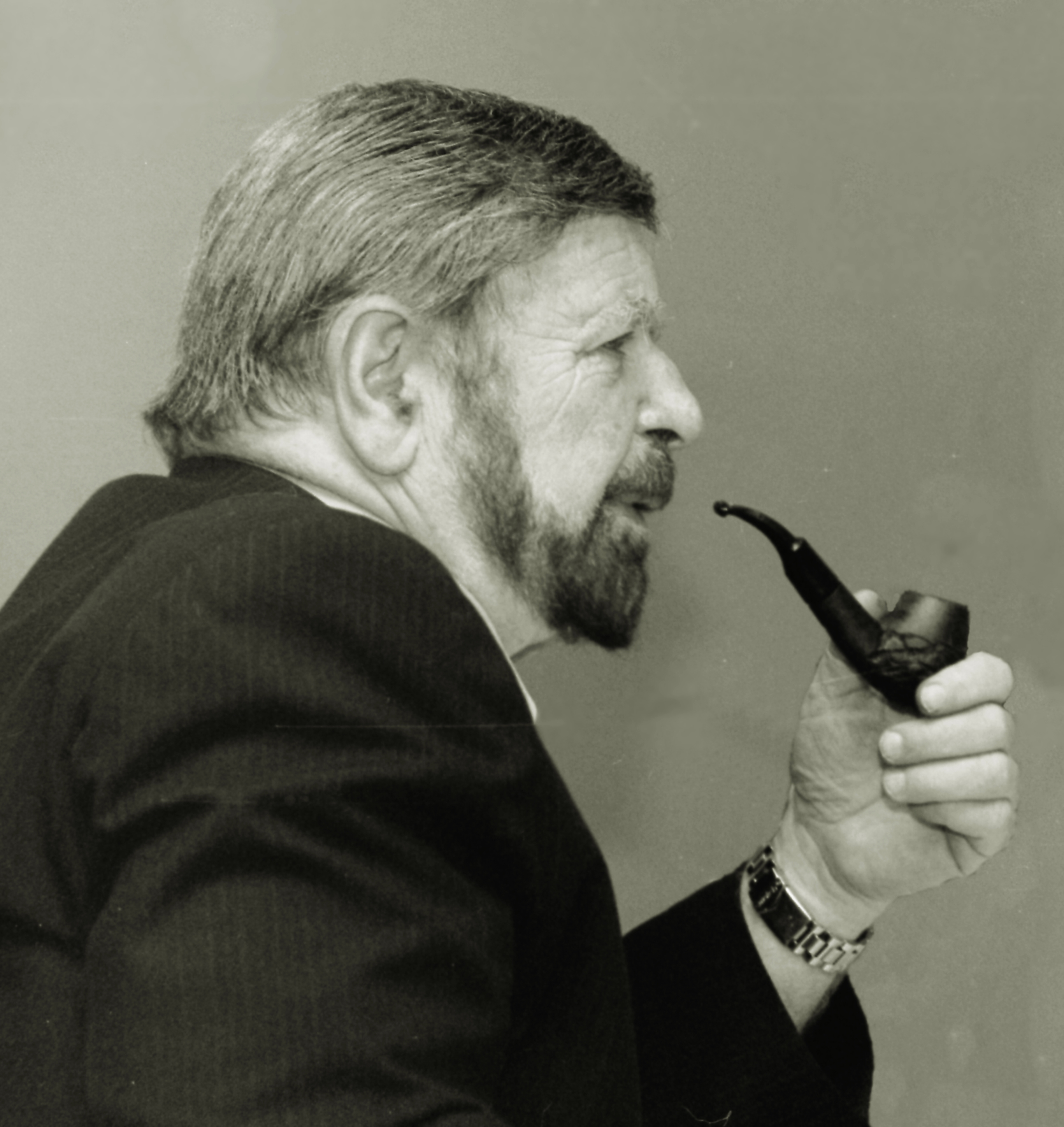
Weiss in 2002, as Israeli ambassador to Poland

Weiss served as a member of the board of the Haifa municipality between 1969 and 1981, when he was elected to the Knesset as a member of the Alignment. Between 1988 and 1992, he served as a Deputy Speaker of the Knesset, and between 1992 and 1996 as Speaker. He lost his seat in the 1999 elections.

On November 4, 1995, Weiss was on stage with Yitzhak Rabin and Shimon Peres at the peace rally in Tel Aviv where Rabin was assassinated.

In 2000 he became a president of the Yad Vashem Council. From 2001 to 2003, he served as an Israeli ambassador in Poland. On 4 January 2004, for his contribution to the cooperation between Poland and Israel, President Aleksander Kwaśniewski awarded him the Grand Cross (1st class) of the Order of Merit of the Republic of Poland.

Weiss spoke Hebrew, Yiddish, Polish, Russian and English. He died on 3 February 2023 in Tel Aviv, at the age of 87.

== See also ==
- List of Knesset speakers
- Israel–Poland relations
