= List of ambassadors of Israel to Albania =

This is a list of Israel's ambassadors to Albania. The ambassador is based in Tirana, the Albanian capital. The current ambassador is Galit Peleg, who holds the position since 2022.

== List of ambassadors ==
- Aviezer Pazner (Non-Resident, Rome) 1991 - 1995
- Yehuda Millo (Non-Resident, Rome) 1995 - 2001
- Ehud Gol (Non-Resident, Rome) 2001 - 2004
- Irit Ben-Abba (Non-Resident, Jerusalem) 2004 - 2006
- Amira Arnon (Non-Resident, Jerusalem) 2007 - 2009
- David Cohen (diplomat) 2012 - 2015
- Boaz Rodkin 2015 - 2019
- Noah Gal Gendler 2019–2022
- Galit Peleg 2022-present
