= List of ambassadors of Israel to the Czech Republic =

The ambassador of Israel to the Czech Republic is the official representative of the State of Israel in the Czech Republic. The position is based in the embassy Israel in Prague and is responsible for overseeing diplomatic relations, political cooperation, and economic engagement between the two countries. Israel and the Czech Republic maintain bilateral ties, shaped by historic connections, and colaberation in areas of Defense, technology, and education.

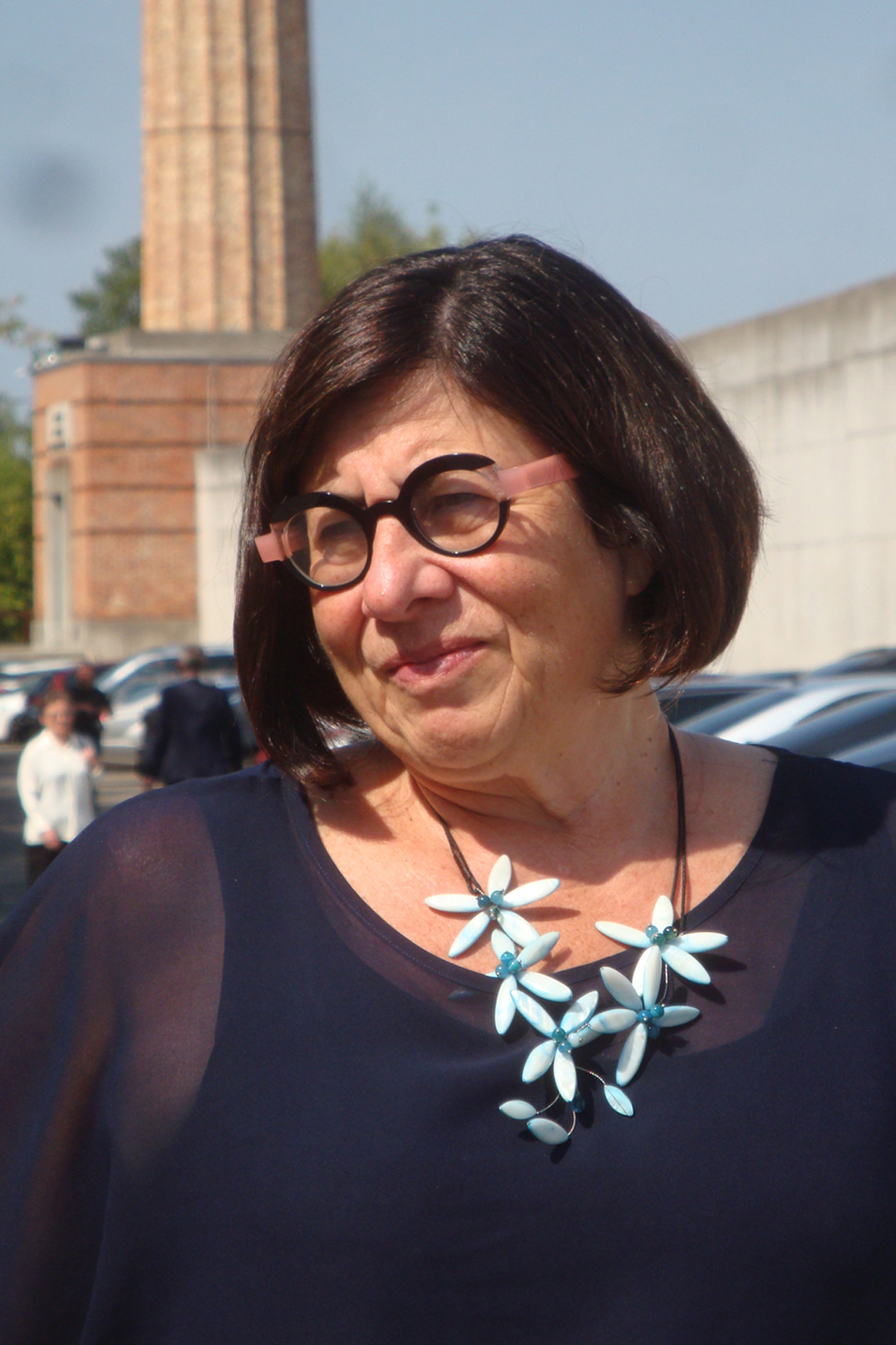
Anna Azari (2021-)

== List of ambassadors ==
- Anna Azari 2021–
- Daniel Meron 2017–2021
- Gary Koren 2013–2017
- Yaakov Levy 2008–2013
- Arie Arazi 2005–2008
- Arthur Avnon 2001–2005
- Erella Hadar, 1999–2001
- Refael Gvir, 1995–1999
- Moshe Yagar, 1993–1995
- Yoel Sher 1990–1993
- Shmuel Bendor, 1957–1959
- Minister Shlomo Kaddar 1956–1957
- Minister Aryeh Leon Kubowitzki, 1951–1952
- Minister Shmoel Elyashiv 1950–1951
- Minister Ehud Avriel 1948–1950.
