= List of ambassadors of Israel to North Macedonia =

This is a list of Israel's ambassadors to North Macedonia. The ambassadors are not based in Skopje, but in the other regional capitals or Jerusalem. Mr. Dan Oryan in an interview for the state television of Northern Macedonia on TELMA TV stated that the Israeli embassy in Skopje will be opened soon.

== List of ambassadors ==
Ambassadors to North Macedonia

- Simona Frankel (2021–)
- Dan Oryan (2018–2021, Resident in Jerusalem)
- Yossi Amrani (2012–03/2014, Non-resident)

Ambassadors to the Former Yugoslav Republic of Macedonia

- Dan Oryan (2014–2018, Resident in Jerusalem)
- Amira Arnon (2007–2009, Resident in Jerusalem)
- Irit Ben-Abba (2004–2006, Resident in Jerusalem)
- Yaffa Ben-Ari (February 2003 – November 2004, Resident in Belgrade)
- Ran Kuriel (December 1996 – 2001?, Resident in Athens)
