= Simona Halperin =

Israeli diplomat

- סימונה הלפרין
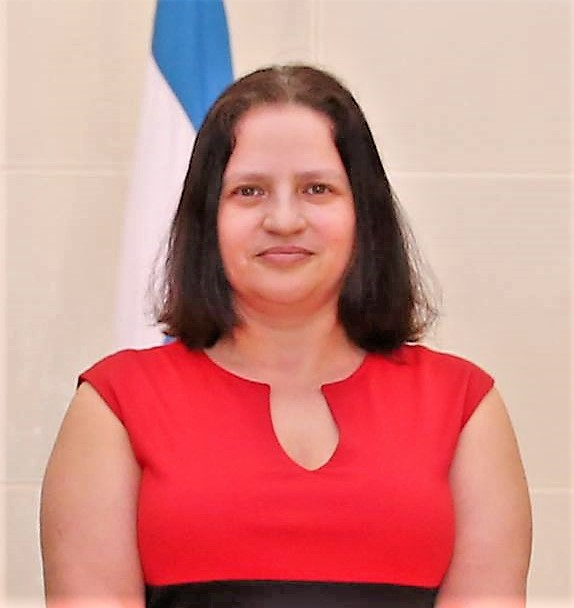

Israeli Ambassador to Russia
- Incumbent
- Assumed office 2023
- Preceded by: Alexander Ben Zvi

Personal details
- Born: 1969 (age 56–57) Riga, Latvian SSR, Soviet Union

Simona Halperin (Hebrew: סימונה הלפרין; born 1969, Riga, Latvia) is an Israeli diplomat currently serving as Ambassador of Israel to Russia. She served as Israeli Ambassador to Singapore and East Timor from 2017 until 2019 when she was replaced by Sagi Karni.

== Career ==
Beginning in August 2010, Halperin was the head of the Israel Economic and Cultural Office in Taipei (ISECO). It is considered the “officially unofficial” delegation to Taiwan.

Halperin also served as deputy ambassador in Kazakhstan and South Korea.

Halperin earned an MA degree in Law and Public administration from the Hebrew University in Jerusalem and has a BA in economics & business administration.

In May 2023 Halperin was chosen as Ambassador of Israel to Russia. She assumed office in December 2023.

== Personal life ==
Halperin has five children.

== Works ==
- "Celebrating the Israel–Singapore Golden Jubilee: Working Towards Continued Partnership" in Beating the Odds Together: 50 Years of Singapore-Israel Ties. Ed. Mattia Tomba. Singapore: World Scientific Book, 2019 . ISBN 978-981-121-468-4 OCLC 1122747159
