= Austria–Palestine relations =

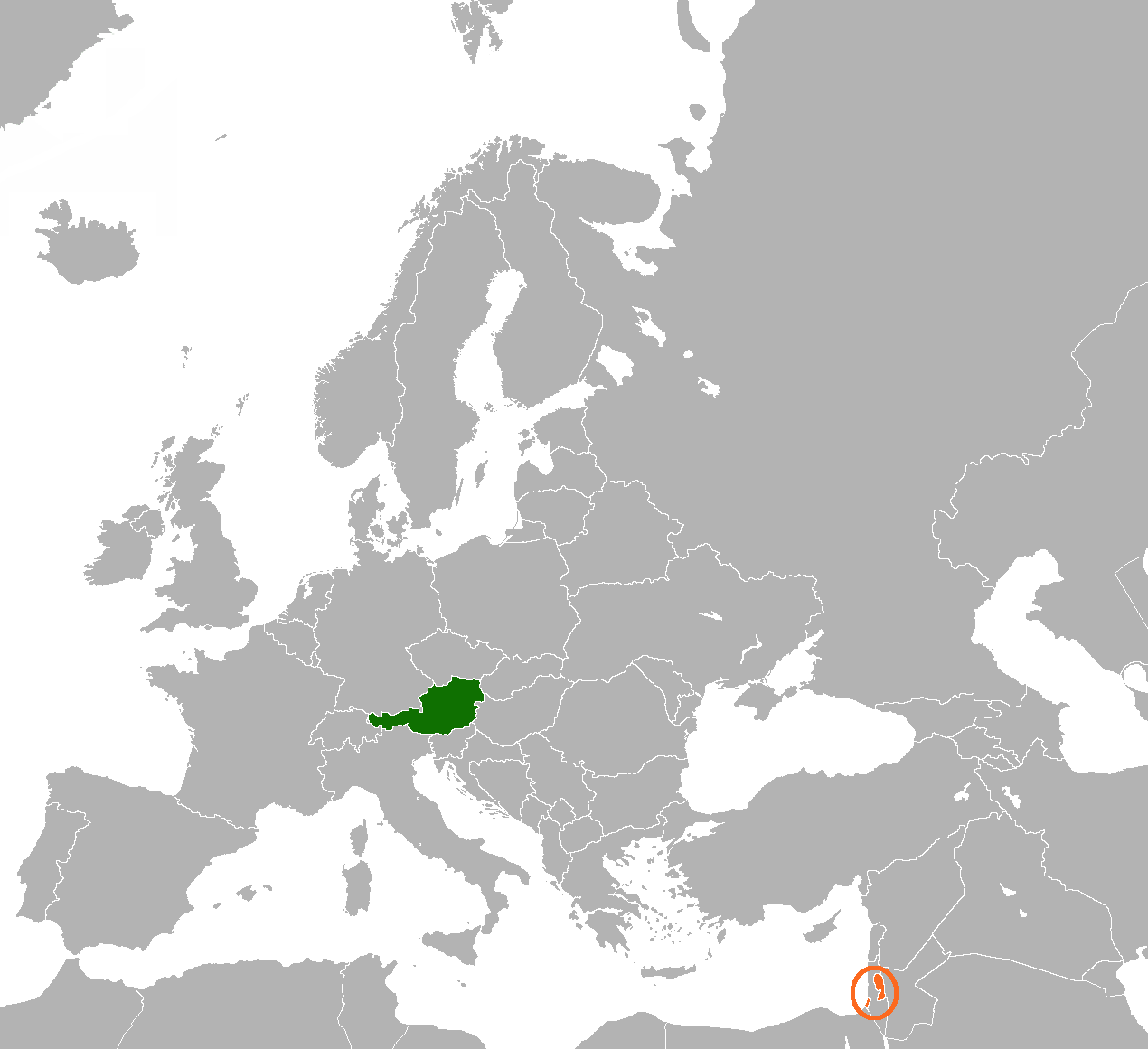

- Austria: Palestine

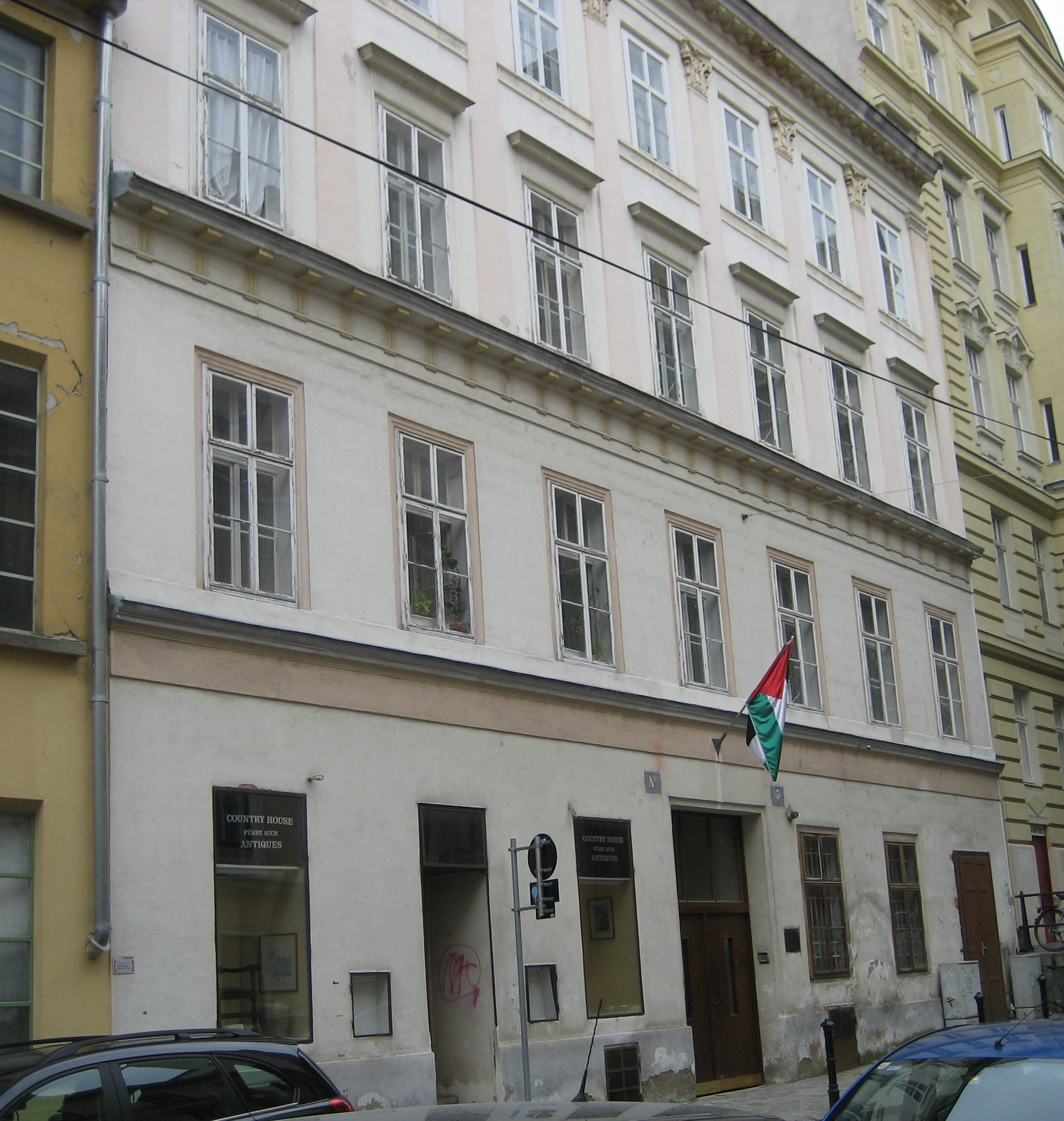
Mission of Palestine in Vienna

Austria–Palestine relations are the bilateral relations between Austria and the State of Palestine. Austria does not fully recognize the Palestinian state declared in 1988. Yet, around the same time, Austria raised the position of the head of the Palestinian mission to the level of ambassador.

In 1973, during a conference in London, Chancellor Bruno Kreisky called for Europe to play a role in the Middle East and declared his support for the creation of a state for the Palestinians. The PLO opened an office in Vienna in 1978, and Austria officially established relations with the organization in 1980.

Chancellor Kreisky, who was a Jew himself, questioned Zionism as a solution to the problems faced by the Jewish people, claiming that Jews were not an ethnic group or race, but rather a religious group.

Austria supported Palestine's application to join UNESCO in 2011. It also supported Palestine's bid to obtain non-member observer status at the United Nations. In April 2013, President Mahmoud Abbas visited Austria and was welcomed with military honors. Afterward, he met with the Federal President Heinz Fischer and the National Council President Barbara Prammer.

== See also ==
- Foreign relations of Austria
- Foreign relations of Palestine
