= Aryeh Levin (diplomat) =

Israeli diplomat

Aryeh Levin (Hebrew: אריה לוין) (born 1930) is an Israeli diplomat. He served as the Israeli Ambassador to the Soviet Union, and Deputy Chief Israeli delegate to the United Nations. Levin is the author of Envoy to Russia, Memoirs of an Israeli Ambassador. Levin continues to advise on matters of international affairs, particularly Iran and Russia.

== Biography ==
Aryeh Levin was born to a Russian Jewish family in Tehran, Iran, and attended an Iranian Jewish primary and an American Community secondary school in Tehran. He made aliyah to Israel in October 1950 and later studied at the departments of Mideastern and Political Science studies at the Hebrew University of Jerusalem.

Between 1948 and 1950 Levin Worked for Aliyah – American Jewish Joint Distribution Committee, directing a refugee camp and as personal assistant to the first country director of AJDC.

In 1951 Levin enlisted in the IDF, Infantry, receiving Officer training and in 1964 he was part of the Army Intelligence Corps. In 1958 he was assigned as head of the research unit at Army Intelligence on Great Powers and the non-Arab countries of ME and Horn of Africa. Three years later he was promoted to Head of the Intelligence Corps on missions to Ethiopia and Iran.

He lives in Jerusalem with his wife, Aliza.

== Diplomatic career ==
In April 1962 he joined the Ministry of Foreign Affairs in Jerusalem as Head of the Iran and Horn of Africa desk. A year later he served as the First Secretary at the Israel Embassy in Addis-Ababa, Ethiopia. In 1965 Levin was Head of a diplomatic mission to Rwanda, Central Africa. In 1967 he was appointed Political Officer (Counselor) at the Israel embassy, Paris, France, and in 1972 Head of the political information section at the information division, MFA, Jerusalem.

In September 1977 Levin was made Director of the Middle East and Eastern Mediterranean Department at the Ministry of Foreign Affairs Jerusalem. He was delegated to the Turkish foreign ministry for talks with head of the ministry's intelligence division.

He served as Minister Plenipotentiary and temporary Chargé d'Affaires of Israel's diplomatic mission to Tehran, Iran (1973) and as Ambassador Extraordinary and Plenipotentiary, Deputy Head of Mission to the UN in New York City in 1981, as well as Chief Israeli delegate to the United Nations General Assembly's Special Political Committee between 1982 and 1984.

In 1985, he returned to Jerusalem to serve as Head of the Political Research and planning Division in the Ministry of Foreign Affairs. Later in 1988 he was appointed by Prime Minister Yitzhak Shamir to lead the diplomatic group to the Soviet Union with the mission of heading toward the restoration of diplomatic relations with Israel. In 1990 Levin was appointed Israel's Consul-General to the Soviet Union, and a year later with the renewal of full diplomatic relations after a break of twenty-three years, was appointed Ambassador Extraordinary and Plenipotentiary to the Soviet Union. In February, he presented letters of credence to Boris Yeltsin, President of Russian Federation, which inherited the USSR. In 2000 he was Delegated by the Israel government as observer at the presidential elections in Russia.

== Environmental activism ==
Levin is active in environmental affairs, specializing in "Waste to Energy", as alternative source of clean energy and in promoting alternative energy in Israel and abroad; He worked at promoting innovative scientific projects in molecular biology and searching for hydrogen sources in the Negev, and searching for oil and gas in Israel. In 2005 Levin lead the expedition of Israeli and Russian scientists in search of Hydrogen in the Negev.

== Published works ==
Levin has written on Israel-Russian, Israeli-Iranian affairs for Israeli, Russian and many other publications. He is the author of ENVOY TO MOSCOW Memoirs of an Israeli Ambassador, 1988-92. In reference to the book, Abba Eban commented that “ Aryeh Levin...has a dramatic story to tell in this book and he tells it with style and passion” and in a review of The Jerusalem Post it was called “ ...an excellent and informative account of how diplomacy and foreign policy go hesitantly hand in hand...A wonderful read.”
