= Katriel Katz =

Israeli diplomat

- כתריאל כץ
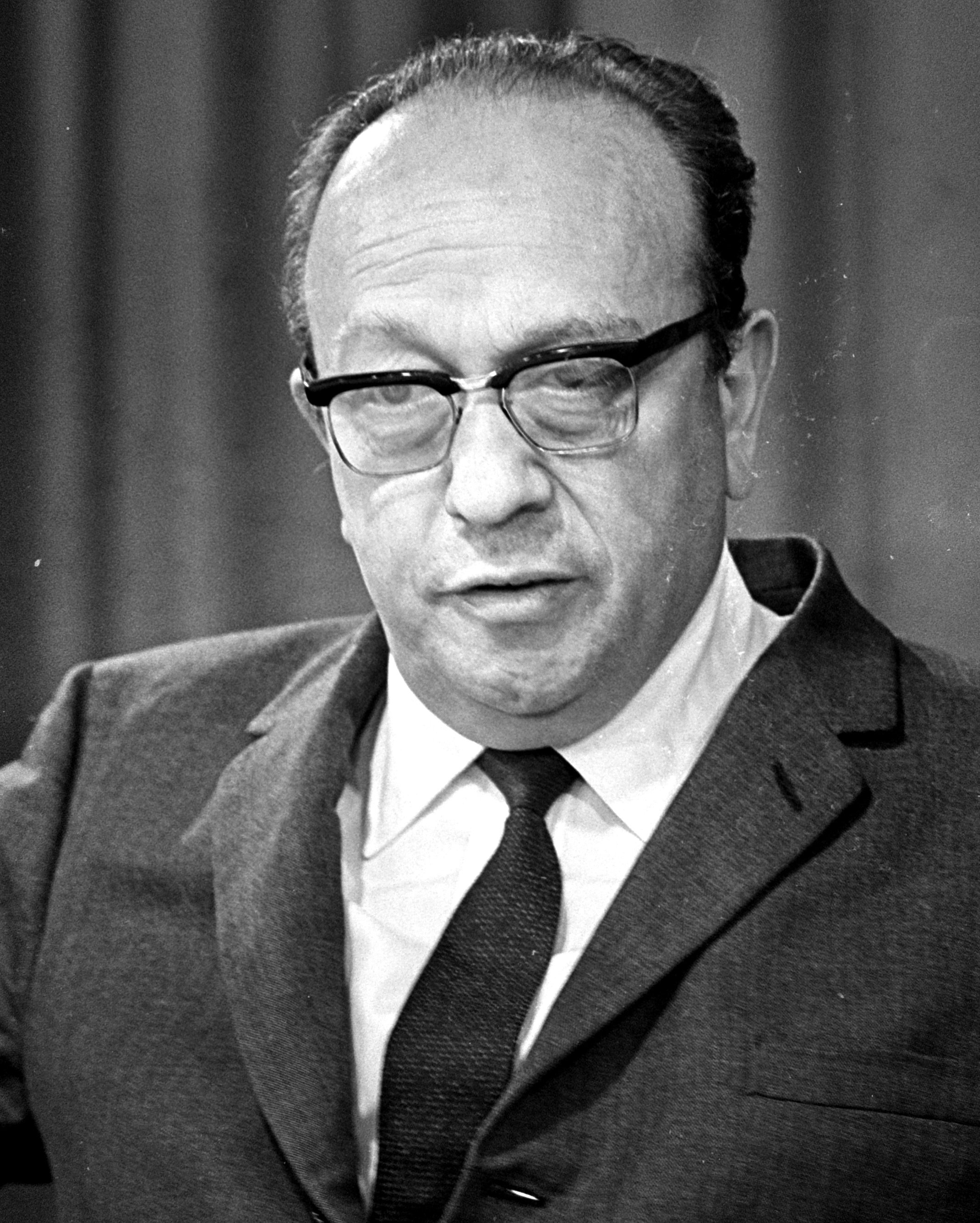
- Katz in 1967
- Born: 1908; Warsaw, Poland
- Died: 1988 (aged 80)
- Occupation: Diplomat

Katriel Katz (Hebrew: כתריאל כץ; October 16, 1908 – October 14, 1988) was an Israeli diplomat who served as ambassador to the Soviet Union between 1965 and 1967 and Poland between 1956 and 1958.

== Ambassador to the Soviet Union ==
Katz was the Israeli ambassador to the Soviet Union in the run up to the Six-Day War. He served in that position for 21 months from September 6, 1965, to June 10, 1967. Katz was expelled from the Soviet Union by Andrei Gromyko on the last day of the Six-Day War. Gromyko is said to have told Katz not to let his emotions get the better of him.

== Air disaster ==
In 1968, Katz was involved in an emergency landing and runway fire at London Heathrow Airport. During the evacuation from the aircraft, Katz was the only passenger to escape through the forward port door, despite the efforts of crew to stop him using that door. The two flight crew were almost carried out through the door by Katz, who was a large man. Katz was seriously injured jumping from the doorway.

== Death ==
Katz died in 1988 at the age of 79.
