= Amira Arnon =

Israeli diplomat

Amira Arnon (Hebrew: אמירה ארנון; born in Haifa, Israel) is an Israeli diplomat who has been Ambassador to multiple countries including Albania (2007-2009) and Singapore from 2009 until 2013. She was also the non-resident Ambassador to Bosnia and Herzegovina and the former Yugoslavia, stationed in Jerusalem from 2007 until 2009.

== Early life and education ==
Arnon was born around 1950.

Arnon graduated from the Hebrew University of Jerusalem with an undergraduate degree in international relations (1972) before attending their Young Diplomats Special Programme on Middle Eastern Affairs 1989-1990. Arnon graduated from the Israel Defense Forces Military College in 1996, the same year she received a MA in political sciences from the National Defence University of Haifa.

== Career ==
From 1974 until 1979, Arnon was Consul General in New York City and Consul General in Philadelphia from 1990 until 1993. She was a Member of the Israeli Delegation to the United Nations in 1996 and 1999. From 2000 until 2005, she was Consul General in Istanbul, Turkey.

While Director of the Northern European Affairs Division at the Israeli Ministry of Foreign Affairs, she long with their Ambassador to Ireland, Zeev Boker, visited the Claire County Council. The visit received criticism from the Ireland-Palestinian Solidarity Campaign (IPSC) after Sinn Féin’s Mike McKee criticized the local authority for allowing the visit to happen. The local government responded that when accredited ambassadors are in the area, they are allowed a visit as a courtesy call.
