= Lisco =

Lisco may refer to one of the following:

- Lisco, Nebraska, a census-designated place in the United States
  - Lisco State Aid Bridge, listed on National Register of Historic Places
- Adrian Esquino Lisco (died 2007), El Salvadoran activist
- Emil Gustav Lisco (1819-1887), German Protestant minister
- Friedrich Gustav Lisco (1791-1866), German Protestant theologian
- Libyan Iron and Steel Company, a Libyan steelmaker
