= List of ambassadors of Israel to El Salvador =

The Ambassador from Israel to El Salvador is Israel's foremost diplomatic representative in El Salvador.

== List of ambassadors ==
- Mattanya Cohen 2021-
- Amir Ofek (Non-Resident, San José) 2018 - 2021
- Oren Bar-El 2015 - 2018
- Shmulik Arie Bass 2011 - 2014
- Mattanya Cohen 2007 - 2011
- Tsuriel Raphael 2006 - 2007
- Jonathan Peled 2004 - 2006
- Yosef Livne 2001 - 2004
- Aryeh Zur 1998 - 2001
- Yosef Livne 1993 - 1997
- David Cohen (diplomat) 1990 - 1993
- Baruch Gilad 1988 - 1990
- Avraham Sarlouis 1978 - 1980
- Yaacov Deckel 1974 - 1978
- Joshua Nissim Shai (Non-Resident, Guatemala City) 1959 - 1964
- Minister David Shaltiel (Non-Resident, Mexico City) 1956 - 1959
- Minister Yossef Keisari (Non-Resident, Mexico City) 1954 - 1956
