= Jesus in Christianity =

Son of God in Christianity

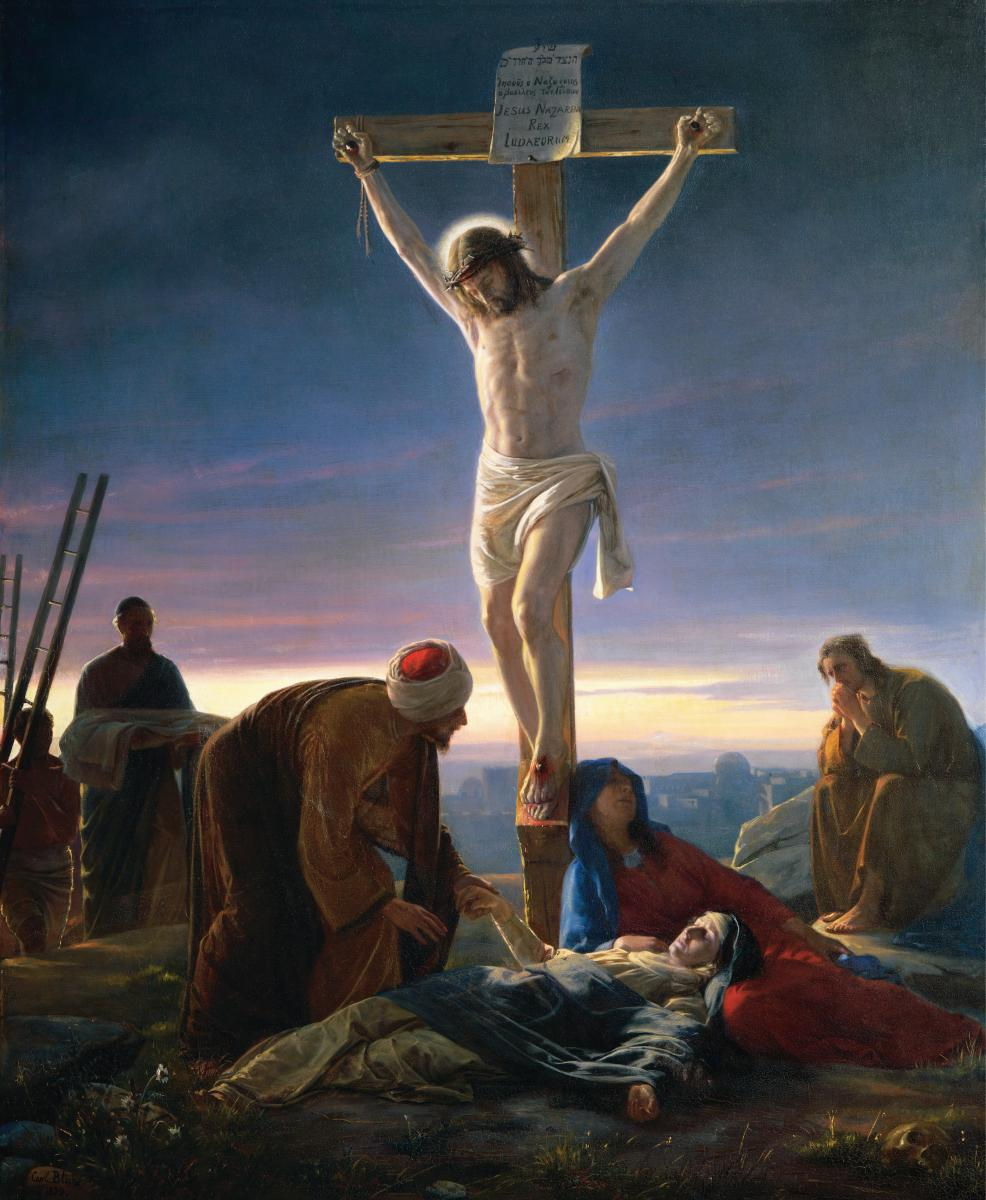
Christ on the Cross, 1870, by Carl Heinrich Bloch, depicting Jesus's crucifixion

In Christianity, Jesus is the Son of God as chronicled in the Bible's New Testament, and is in traditional Trinitarian theology held to be God the Son, a prosopon (person) of the Trinity of God. Christians believe him to be the Jewish messiah (giving him the title Christ), who was prophesied in the Bible's Old Testament. Through Jesus's crucifixion and his raising from the dead, Christians believe that God offers humans salvation and eternal life, with Jesus's death atoning for all sin.

These teachings emphasize that, as the Lamb of God, Jesus voluntarily endured being nailed to the cross at Calvary as a sign of his obedience to the will of God, serving as an "agent and servant of God". Jesus's choice positions him as a man of obedience, in contrast to Adam's disobedience. According to the New Testament, after God raised him from the dead, Jesus ascended to heaven to sit at the right hand of God the Father, with his followers awaiting his return to Earth and God's subsequent Last Judgement.

According to the gospel accounts, Jesus was born of a virgin, and he taught other Jews how to follow God, performed miracles and gathered disciples. Christians generally believe that this narrative is historically true.

His teaching is presented in terms of words and works. His words include the discourses, most notably the Sermon on the Mount and its Beatitudes, as well as approximately thirty parables. These parables make up about a third of his recorded teaching and set everyday images against spiritual ones, particularly concerning the "Kingdom of God". The miracles are likewise portrayed not simply as demonstrations of power, but as signs that accompany and reinforce his message. The accounts commonly associate these acts with faith, performed without payment, and present them as evidence of his divine authority.

While there has been theological debate over the nature of Jesus, Trinitarian Christians believe that Jesus is the Logos, God incarnate (God in human form), God the Son, and "true God and true man"—fully divine and fully human. Jesus, having become fully human in all respects, suffered the pains and temptations of a mortal man, yet he did not sin.

Nontrinitarian Christians, including the Church of Jesus Christ of Latter-day Saints, Jehovah's Witnesses and Unitarians, reject the Trinity and differ widely among themselves on his nature, some holding him to be a prophet or a perfect created human rather than divine.

== Key ideas ==
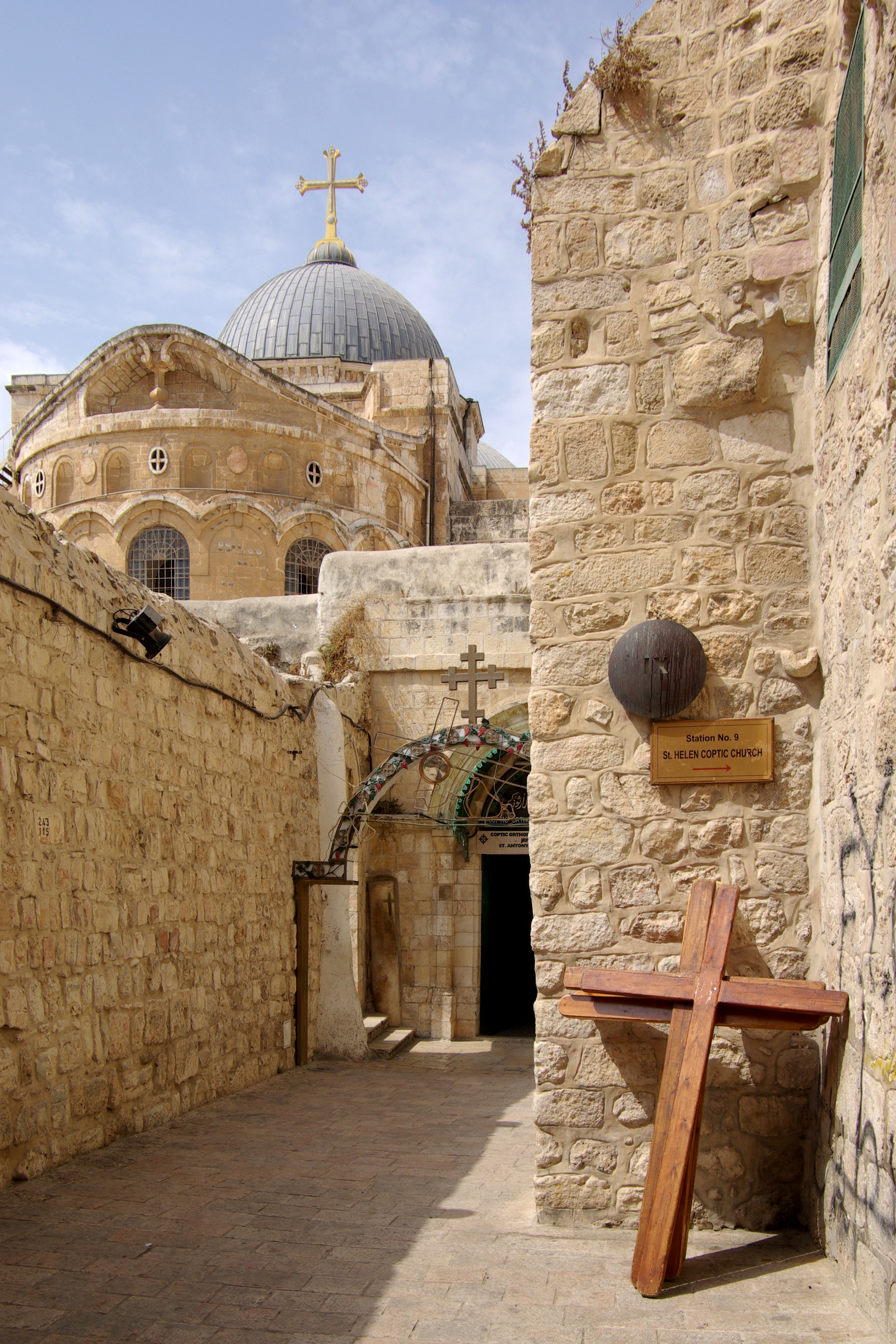
The Church of the Holy Sepulchre is a holy site in Jerusalem believed by most Christians to encompass the tomb of Jesus and the site of his crucifixion and resurrection.

Although Christian views of Jesus vary, it is possible to summarise the key elements of the beliefs shared by major Christian denominations by analysing their catechetical or confessional texts. Christian views of Jesus are derived from various biblical sources, particularly from the canonical gospels and New Testament letters such as the Pauline epistles. Christians predominantly hold that these works are historically true.

Those Christian groups or denominations which are committed to what are considered biblically orthodox Christianity nearly all agree that Jesus:

- was born of a virgin;
- is a human being who is also fully God;
- has never sinned during his existence;
- was crucified, died, and was buried in a tomb;
- rose from the dead on the third day;
- ascended back to God the Father 40 days after his resurrection;
- will return to Earth.

Some groups considered to be Christian hold beliefs that are considered to be heterodox. For example, believers in monophysitism reject the idea that Jesus has two natures, one human and one divine.

The five major milestones in the gospel narrative of the life of Jesus are his baptism, transfiguration, death by crucifixion, resurrection and ascension to Heaven. These are usually bracketed by two other episodes: his nativity at the beginning and the sending of the Paraclete (Holy Spirit) at the end. The gospel accounts of the teachings of Jesus are often presented in terms of specific categories involving his "works and words", e.g., his ministry, parables and miracles.

Christians not only attach theological significance to the works of Jesus, but also to his name; devotions to the name of Jesus go back to the earliest days of Christianity. These exist today both in Eastern and Western Christianity.

Christians predominantly profess that through Jesus' life, death, and rising from the dead, he restored humanity's right relationship with God with the blood of the New Covenant. His death on a cross is understood as a redemptive sacrifice: the source of humanity's salvation and the atonement for sin which had entered human history through the sin of Adam.

== Christ, Logos and Son of God ==
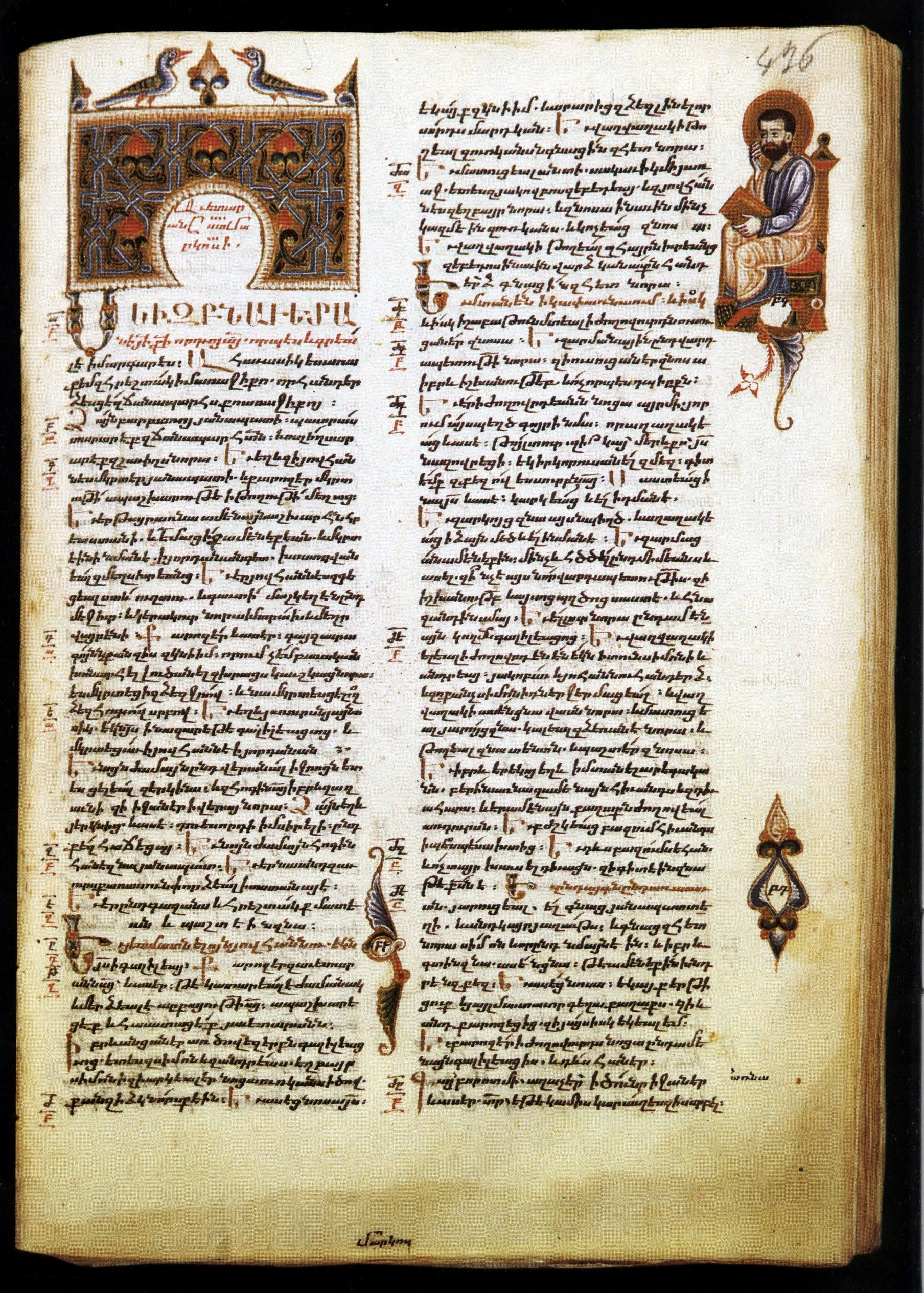
First page of Mark, by Sargis Pitsak (14th century): "The beginning of the gospel of Jesus Christ, the Son of God".

But who do you say that I am? Only Simon Peter answered him: You are the Christ, the Son of the living God — Matthew 16:15-16

Jesus is mediator, but […] the title means more than someone between God and man. He is not just a third party between God and humanity. [...] As true God he brings God to mankind. As true man he brings mankind to God.

Most Christians generally consider Jesus to be the Christ, the long-awaited Messiah, as well as the one and only Son of God. The opening words in the Gospel of Mark (1:1), "The beginning of the gospel of Jesus Christ, the Son of God", provide Jesus with the two distinct attributions as Christ and as the Son of God. His divinity is again re-affirmed in Mark 1:11. Matthew 1:1 which begins by calling Jesus the Christ and in verse 16 explains it again with the affirmation: "Jesus, who is called Christ".

In the Pauline epistles, the word Christ is so closely associated with Jesus that apparently for the early Christians there was no need to claim that Jesus was Christ, for that was considered widely accepted among them. Hence Paul could use the term Christos with no confusion about who it referred to, and as in 1 Corinthians 4:15 and Romans 12:5 he could use expressions such as "in Christ" to refer to the followers of Jesus.

In the New Testament, the title "Son of God" is applied to Jesus on many occasions, from the Annunciation up to the Crucifixion. The declaration that Jesus is the Son of God is made by many individuals in the New Testament, and on two occasions by God the Father as a voice from Heaven, and is asserted by Jesus himself.

In Christology, the concept that Christ is the Logos (i.e., "The Word") has been important in establishing the doctrine of the divinity of Christ and his position as God the Son in the Trinity as set forth in the Chalcedonian Creed. This derives from the opening of the Gospel of John, commonly translated into English as: "In the beginning was the Word, and the Word was with God, and the Word was God." λόγος in the original Koine Greek is translated as Word and in theological discourse, this is often left in its English transliterated form, Logos.

The pre-existence of Christ refers to the existence of Christ before his incarnation as Jesus. One of the relevant New Testament passages is John 1:1-18 where, in the Trinitarian view, Christ is identified with a pre-existent divine hypostasis called the Logos or Word. This doctrine is reiterated in John 17:5 when Jesus refers to the glory which he had with the Father "before the world was" during the Farewell Discourse. John 17:24 also refers to the Father loving Jesus "before the foundation of the world". Nontrinitarian views about the pre-existence of Christ vary, with some rejecting it and others accepting it.

Following the Apostolic Age, from the 2nd century forward, several controversies developed about how the human and divine are related within the person of Jesus. Eventually in 451, the concept of a hypostatic union was stated at the Council of Chalcedon, namely that Jesus is both fully divine and fully human. However, differences among Christian denominations continued thereafter, with some rejecting the hypostatic union in favour of monophysitism.

== Incarnation, Nativity and Second Adam ==
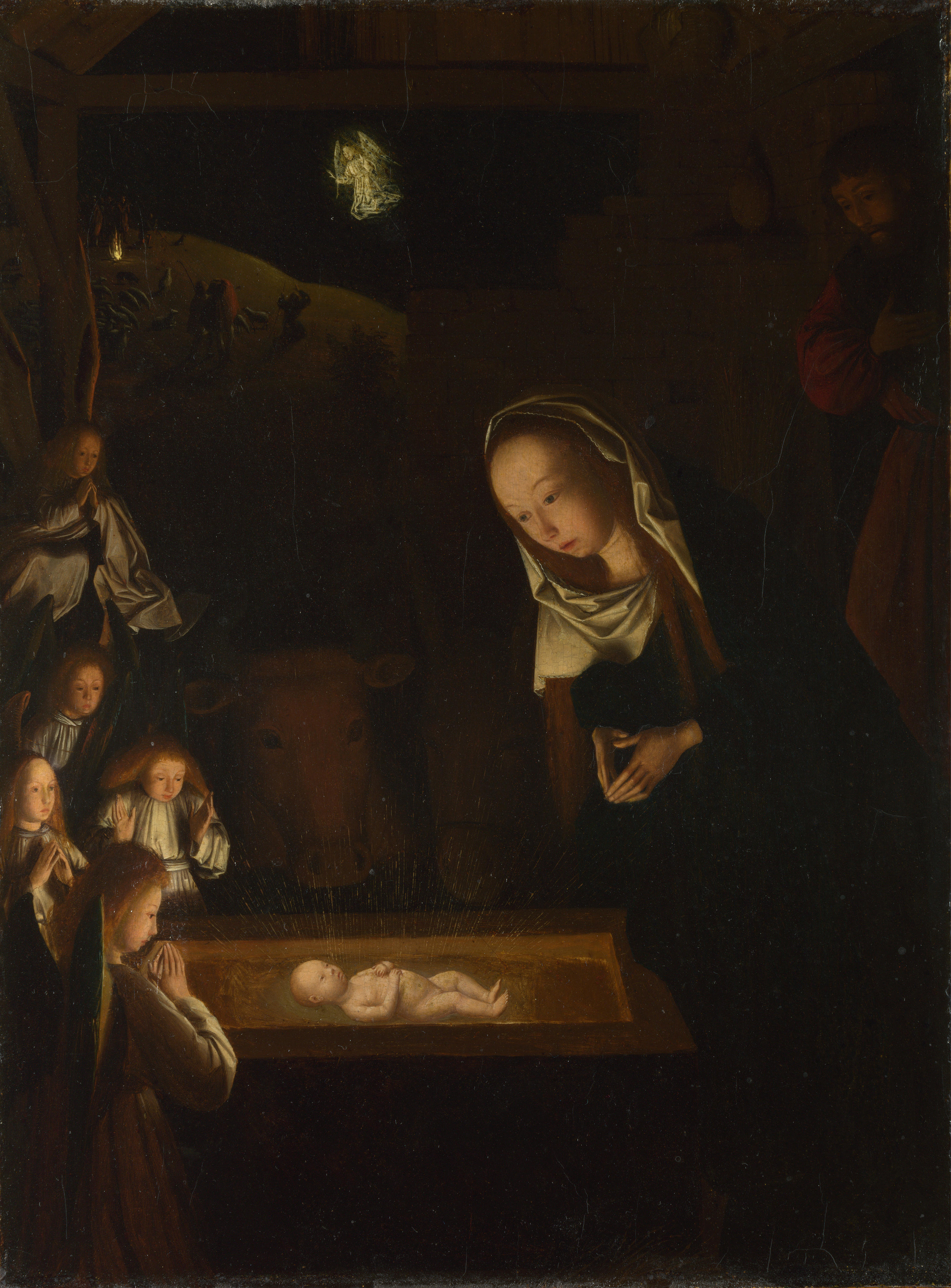
Nativity at Night, by Geertgen tot Sint Jans, c. 1490

He is the image of the invisible God, the firstborn of all creation. For by him all things were created, in heaven and on earth, visible and invisible. — Colossians 1:15-16

The above verse from Colossians regards the birth of Jesus as the model for all creation.

Paul the Apostle viewed the birth of Jesus as an event of cosmic significance which brought forth a "new man" who undid the damage caused by the fall of the first man, Adam. Just as the Johannine view of Jesus as the incarnate Logos proclaims the universal relevance of his birth, the Pauline perspective emphasizes the birth of a new man and a new world in the birth of Jesus. Paul's eschatological view of Jesus counter-positions him as a new man of morality and obedience, in contrast to Adam. Unlike Adam, the new man born in Jesus obeys God and ushers in a world of morality and salvation.

In the Pauline view, Adam is positioned as the first man and Jesus as the second: Adam, having corrupted himself by his disobedience, also infected humanity and left it with a curse as its inheritance. The birth of Jesus counterbalanced the fall of Adam, bringing forth redemption and repairing the damage done by Adam.

In the 2nd century Church Father Irenaeus writes:

"When He became incarnate and was made man, He commenced afresh the long line of human beings, and furnished us, in a brief, comprehensive manner, with salvation; so that what we had lost in Adam—namely to be according to the image and likeness of God- that we might recover in Christ Jesus."

In patristic theology, Paul's contrasting of Jesus as the new man versus Adam provided a framework for discussing the uniqueness of the birth of Jesus and the ensuing events of his life. The nativity of Jesus thus began to serve as the starting point for "cosmic Christology" in which the birth, life and resurrection of Jesus have universal implications. The concept of Jesus as the "new man" repeats in the cycle of birth and rebirth of Jesus from his nativity to his resurrection: following his birth, through his morality and obedience to the Father, Jesus began a "new harmony" in the relationship between God the Father and man. The nativity and resurrection of Jesus thus created the author and exemplar of a new humanity. In this view, the birth, death and resurrection of Jesus brought about salvation, undoing the damage of Adam.

Christians believe Jesus was from the Davidic line; as the biological son of David, he would be of the Jewish race, ethnicity, nation, and culture. One argument against this would be a contradiction in Jesus' genealogies: Matthew saying he is the son of Solomon and Luke saying he is the son of Nathan—Solomon and Nathan being brothers. John of Damascus taught that there is no contradiction, for Nathan wed Solomon's wife after Solomon died in accordance with scripture, namely, yibbum (the mitzvah that a man must marry his brother's childless widow).

Jesus grew up in Galilee and much of his ministry took place there. The languages spoken in Galilee and Judea during the 1st century AD include Jewish Palestinian Aramaic, Hebrew, and Greek, with Aramaic being predominant. There is substantial consensus that Jesus gave most of his teachings in Aramaic in the Galilean dialect.

The canonical gospels describe Jesus wearing tzitzit – the tassels on a tallit – in Matthew 14:36 and Luke 8:43–44. Besides this, the New Testament includes no descriptions of Jesus' appearance before his death and the gospel narratives are generally indifferent to people's racial appearance or features.

== Ministry ==
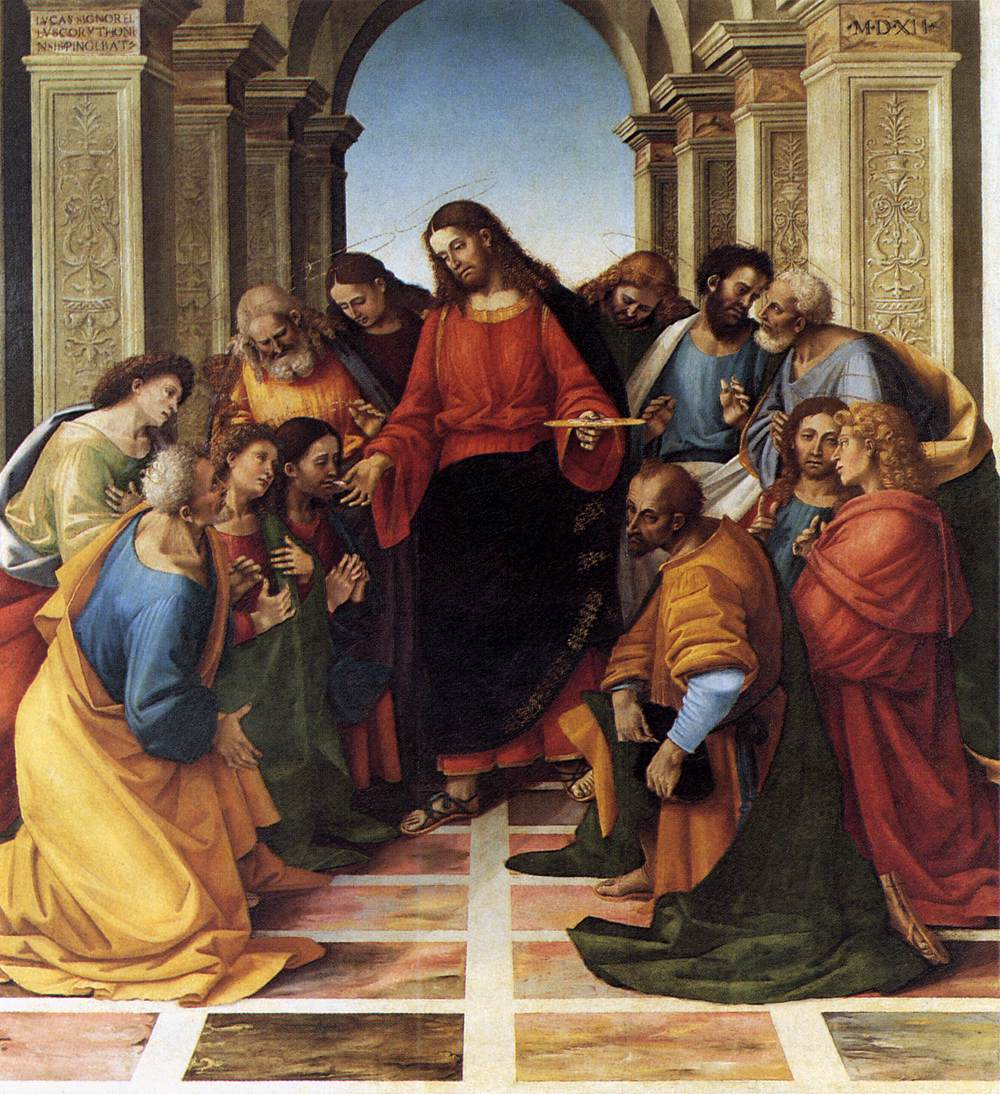
The Communion of the Apostles, by Luca Signorelli, 1512

The thief comes only in order to steal and kill and destroy. I came that they may have and enjoy life, and have it in abundance (to the full, till it overflows).—John 10:10 (Ampl)

Jesus seemed to have two basic concerns with reference to people and the material: (1) that they be freed from the tyranny of things and (2) that they be actively concerned for the needs of others.

In the canonical gospels, the Ministry of Jesus begins with his baptism in the countryside of Judea, near the River Jordan and ends in Jerusalem, following the Last Supper. The Gospel of Luke (3:23) states that Jesus was "about 30 years of age" at the start of his ministry. The date of the start of his ministry has been estimated at around AD 27 to 29 and the end in the range AD 30 to 36.

Jesus' early Galilean ministry begins when after his baptism, he goes back to Galilee from his time in the Judean desert. In this early period he preaches around Galilee and recruits his first disciples who begin to travel with him and eventually form the core of the early Church. The major Galilean ministry which begins in Matthew 8 includes the commissioning of the Twelve Apostles, and covers most of the ministry of Jesus in Galilee. The final Galilean ministry begins after the death of John the Baptist as Jesus prepares to go to Jerusalem.

In the later Judean ministry Jesus starts his final journey to Jerusalem through Judea. As Jesus travels towards Jerusalem, in the later Perean ministry, about one third the way down from the Sea of Galilee along the River Jordan, he returns to the area where he was baptized.

The final ministry in Jerusalem is sometimes called the Passion Week and begins with the Jesus' triumphal entry into Jerusalem. The gospels provide more details about the final ministry than the other periods, devoting about one third of their text to the last week of the life of Jesus in Jerusalem.

== Teachings, parables and miracles ==
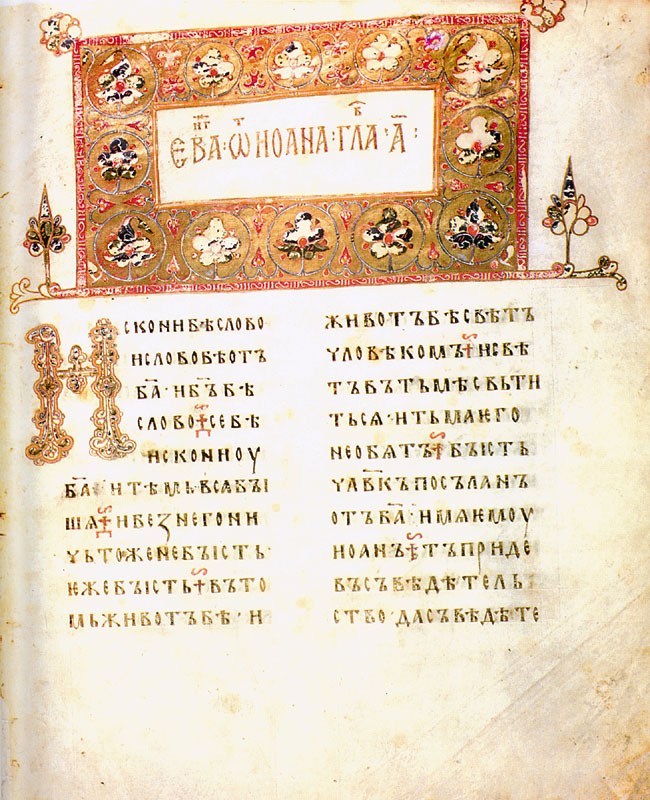
A Gospel of John, 1056

The words that I say unto you I speak not from myself: but the Father who dwells in me does his works. — John 14:10

In the New Testament the teachings of Jesus are presented in terms of his "words and works". The words of Jesus include several sermons, in addition to parables that appear throughout the narrative of the Synoptic Gospels (the gospel of John includes no parables). The works include the miracles and other acts performed during his ministry.

Although the Canonical Gospels are the major source of the teachings of Jesus, the Pauline epistles, which were likely written decades before the gospels, provide some of the earliest written accounts of the teachings of Jesus.

The New Testament does not present the teachings of Jesus as merely his own teachings, but equates the words of Jesus with divine revelation, with John the Baptist stating in John 3:34: "For the one whom God has sent speaks the words of God, for God gives the Spirit without limit." and Jesus stating in John 7:16: "My teaching is not my own. It comes from the one who sent me". In Matthew 11:27 Jesus claims divine knowledge, stating: "No one knows the Son except the Father and no one knows the Father except the Son", asserting the mutual knowledge he has with the Father.

=== Discourses ===
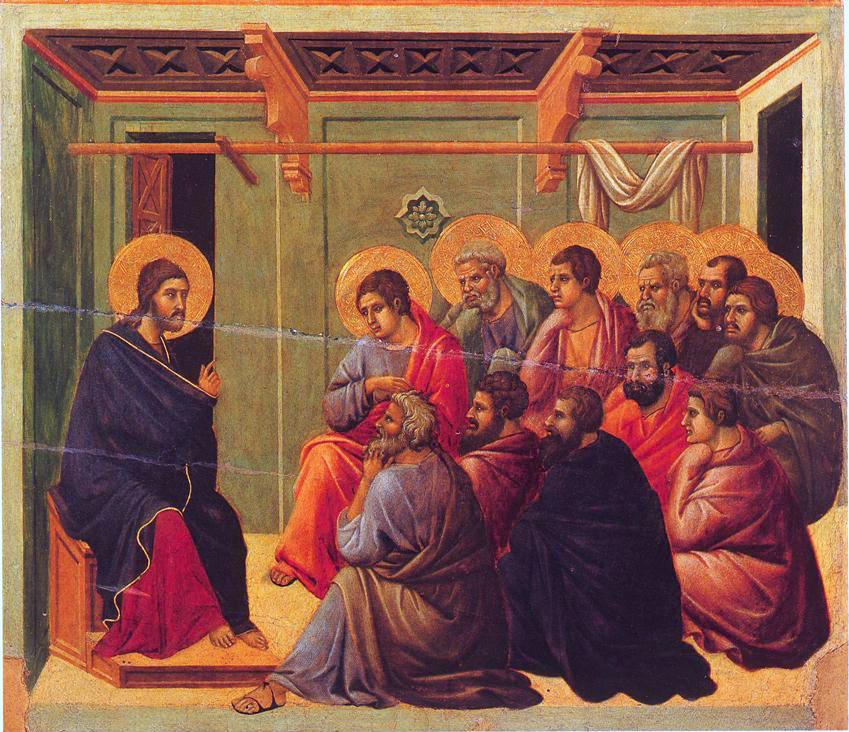
Jesus' Farewell Discourse to his eleven remaining disciples after the Last Supper, from the Maestà by Duccio

The gospels include several discourses by Jesus on specific occasions, such as the Farewell Discourse delivered after the Last Supper, the night before his Crucifixion. Although some of the teachings of Jesus are reported as taking place within the formal atmosphere of a synagogue (e.g., in Matthew 4:23) many of the discourses are more like conversations than formal lectures.

The Gospel of Matthew has a structured set of sermons, often grouped as the Five Discourses of Matthew which present many of the key teachings of Jesus. Each of the five discourses has some parallel passages in the Gospel of Mark or the Gospel of Luke. The five discourses in Matthew begin with the Sermon on the Mount, which encapsulates many of the moral teachings of Jesus and which is one of the best known and most quoted elements of the New Testament. The Sermon on the Mount includes the Beatitudes, which describe the character of those who belong to the Kingdom of God, expressed as "blessings". The Beatitudes focus on love and humility rather than force and exaction and echo the key ideals of Jesus' teachings on spirituality and compassion. The other discourses in Matthew include the Missionary Discourse in Matthew 10 and the Discourse on the Church in Matthew 18, providing instructions to the disciples and laying the foundation of the codes of conduct for the anticipated community of followers.

=== Parables ===
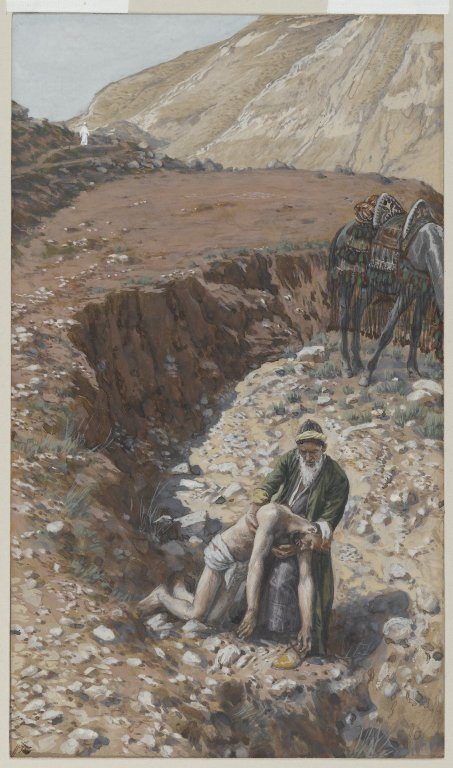
The Good Samaritan by James Tissot. The Parable of the Good Samaritan is one of the parables of Jesus.

The parables of Jesus represent a major component of his teachings in the gospels, the approximately thirty parables forming about one third of his recorded teachings. The parables may appear within longer sermons, as well as other places within the narrative. Jesus' parables are seemingly simple and memorable stories, often with imagery, and each conveys a teaching which usually relates the physical world to the spiritual world.

In the 19th century the theologians Friedrich Gustav Lisco and Patrick Fairbairn stated that in the parables of Jesus, "the image borrowed from the visible world is accompanied by a truth from the invisible (spiritual) world" and that the parables of Jesus are not "mere similitudes which serve the purpose of illustration, but are internal analogies where nature becomes a witness for the spiritual world". Similarly, in the 20th century, calling a parable "an earthly story with a heavenly meaning", the theologian William Barclay states that the parables of Jesus use familiar examples to lead others' minds towards heavenly concepts. He suggests that Jesus did not form his parables merely as analogies but based on an "inward affinity between the natural and the spiritual order."

One of the major reasons why Jesus spoke in parables to the Jews was explained to the disciples of Jesus by Jesus himself. It is found in Matthew 13:13-14; there Jesus explains why he used much of parables to the people of Israel. Jesus explained that it was so for the fulfillment of the prophecy of Isaiah the prophet, and this is found in Isaiah 6:9-10. This was for the people of Israel not to understand and realize who Jesus is and accept him, he purposely did this to make provision for Gentiles to be part of the children of God.

=== Miracles ===
In Christian teachings, the miracles of Jesus were as much a vehicle for his message as were his words. Many of the miracles emphasize the importance of faith, for instance in cleansing ten lepers, Jesus did not say: "My power has saved you" but says "Rise and go; your faith has saved you." Similarly, in the Walking on Water miracle, Apostle Peter learns an important lesson about faith in that as his faith wavers, he begins to sink.

Believe the miracles, that you may know and understand that the Father is in me, and I in the Father. —John 10:38

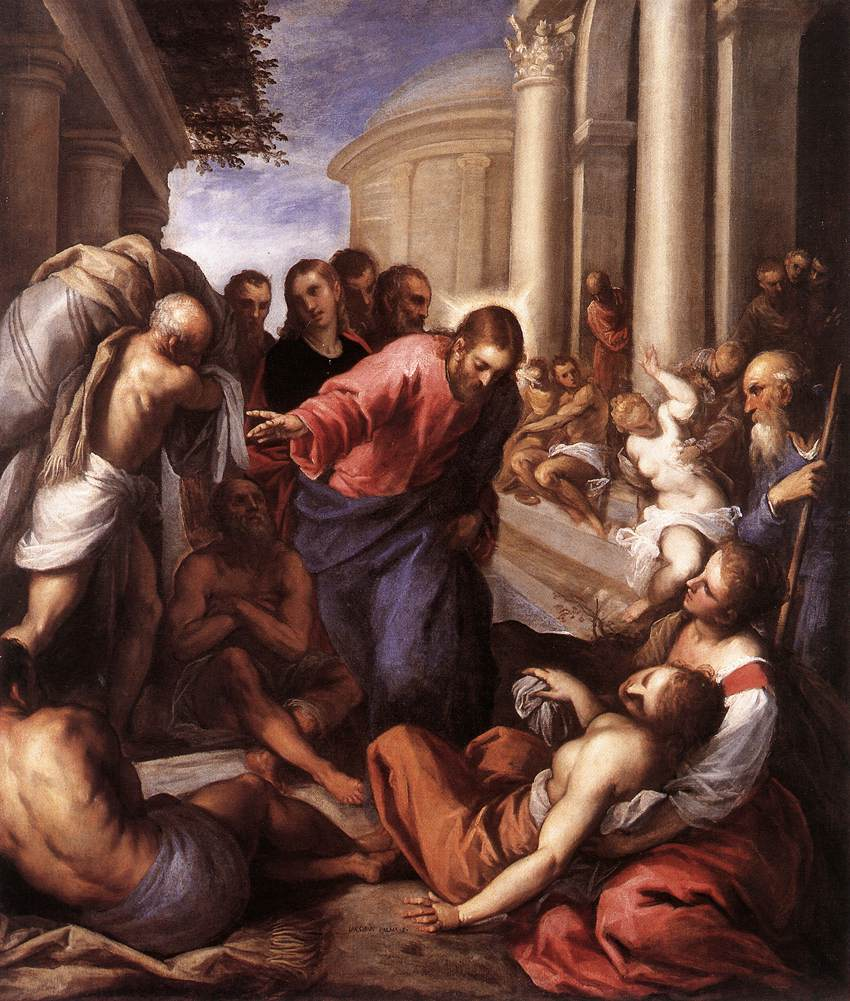
Jesus healing the paralytic in The Pool by Palma il Giovane, 1592

One characteristic shared among all miracles of Jesus in the Gospel accounts is that he delivered benefits freely and never requested or accepted any form of payment for his healing miracles, unlike some high priests of his time who charged those who were healed. In Matthew 10:8 he advised his disciples to heal the sick, raise the dead, cleanse those who have leprosy, and drive out demons without payment and stated: "Freely you have received; freely give".

Christians in general believe that Jesus' miracles were actual historical events and that his miraculous works were an important part of his life, attesting to his divinity and the Hypostatic union, i.e., the dual natures of Christ's humanity and divinity in one hypostasis. Christians believe that while Jesus' experiences of hunger, weariness, and death were evidences of his humanity, the miracles were evidences of his deity.

Christian authors also view the miracles of Jesus not merely as acts of power and omnipotence, but as works of love and mercy: they were performed to show compassion for sinful and suffering humanity. Authors Ken and Jim Stocker state that "every single miracle Jesus performed was an act of love". And each miracle involves specific teachings.

Since according to the Gospel of John it was impossible to narrate all the miracles performed by Jesus, the Catholic Encyclopedia states that the miracles presented in the Gospels were selected for a twofold reason: first for the manifestation of God's glory, and then for their evidential value. Jesus referred to his "works" as evidences of his mission and his divinity, and in John 5:36 he declared that his miracles have greater evidential value than the testimony of John the Baptist.

== Crucifixion and atonement ==
The accounts of the crucifixion and subsequent resurrection of Jesus provide a rich background for Christological analysis, from the canonical gospels to the Pauline epistles.

Johannine "agency christology" combines the concept that Jesus is the Son of his Father with the idea that he has come into the world as his Father's agent, commissioned and sent by the Father to represent the Father and to accomplish his Father's work. Implied in each Synoptic portrayal of Jesus is the doctrine that the salvation Jesus gives is inseparable from Jesus himself and his divine identity. Sonship and agency come together in the Synoptic gospels only in the Parable of the Vineyard (Matthew 21:37; Mark 12:6; Luke 20:13). The submission of Jesus to crucifixion is a sacrifice made as an agent of God or servant of God, for the sake of eventual victory. This builds upon the salvific theme of the Gospel of John which begins in John 1:36 with John the Baptist's proclamation: "The Lamb of God who takes away the sins of the world". Further reinforcement of the concept is provided in Revelation 21:14, where the "lamb slain but standing" is the only one worthy of handling the scroll (i.e., the book) containing the names of those who are to be saved.

A central element in the Christology presented in the Acts of the Apostles is the affirmation of the belief that the death of Jesus by crucifixion happened "with the foreknowledge of God, according to a definite plan". In this view, as in Acts 2:23, the cross is not viewed as a scandal, for the crucifixion of Jesus "at the hands of the lawless" is viewed as the fulfilment of the plan of God.

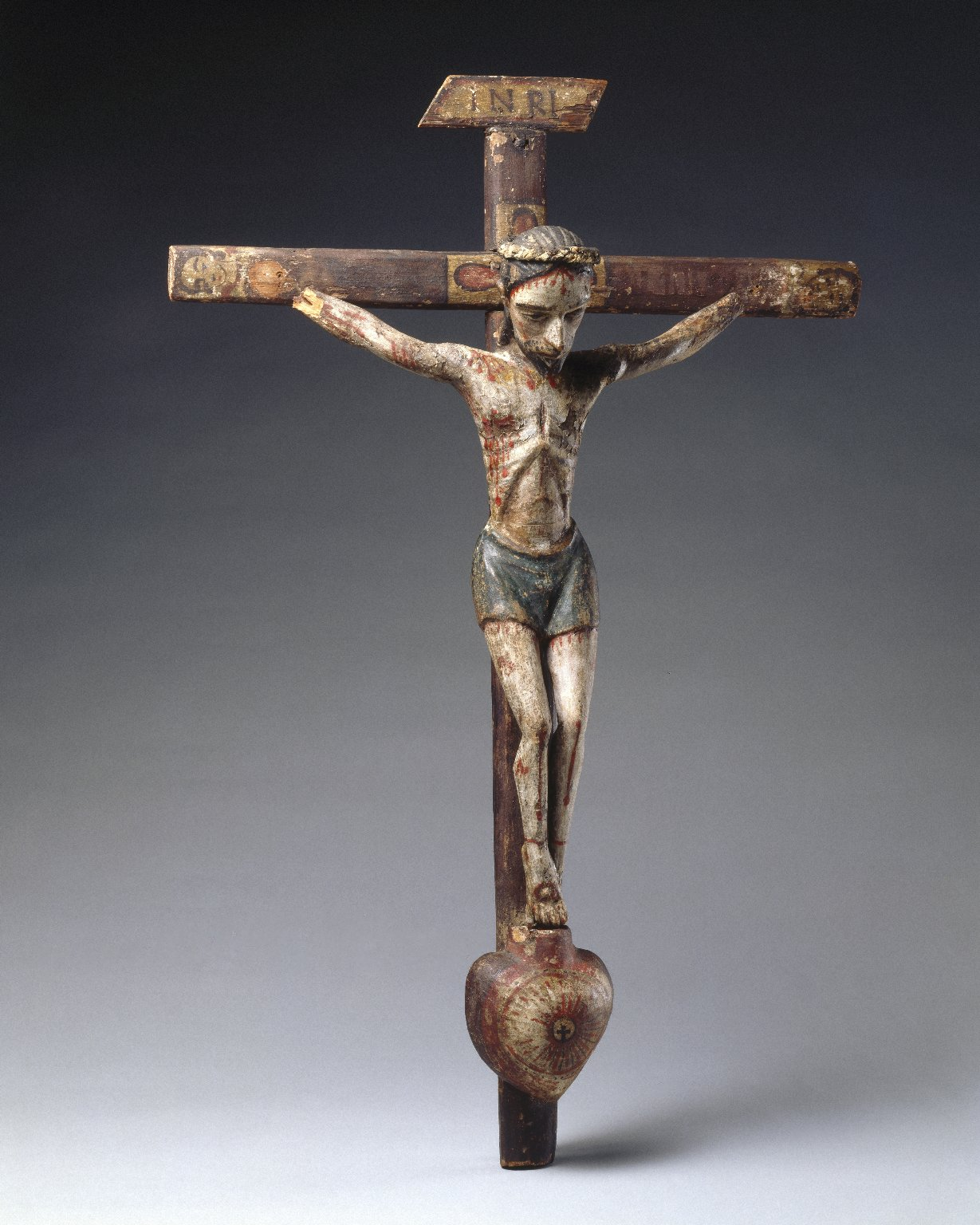
Many Christians use the crucifix to symbolise Jesus' sacrificial death and as a focus for devotion.

Paul's Christology has a specific focus on the death and resurrection of Jesus. For Paul, Jesus' crucifixion is directly related to his resurrection and the term "the cross of Christ" used in Galatians 6:12 may be viewed as his abbreviation of the message of the gospels. For Paul, the crucifixion of Jesus was not an isolated event in history, but a cosmic event with significant eschatological consequences, as in 1 Corinthians 2:8. In the Pauline view, Jesus, obedient to the point of death (Philippians 2:8), died "at the right Nuno Gallego from the resurrection of his Lord.

John Calvin supported the "agent of God" Christology and argued that, during his trial in Pilate's court, Jesus could have successfully defended his innocence but instead submitted to crucifixion in obedience to the Father. This Christological theme continued into the 20th century, both in the Eastern and Western Churches. In the Eastern Church Sergei Bulgakov argued that the crucifixion of Jesus was "pre-eternally" determined by the Father before the creation of the world, to redeem humanity from the disgrace caused by the fall of Adam. In the Western Church, Karl Rahner elaborated on the analogy that the blood of the Lamb of God (and the water from the side of Jesus) shed at the crucifixion had a cleansing nature, similar to baptismal water.

Latter-day Saints believe that the crucifixion was the culmination of Christ's atonement, which began in the Garden of Gethsemane.

== Resurrection, Ascension, and Second Coming ==
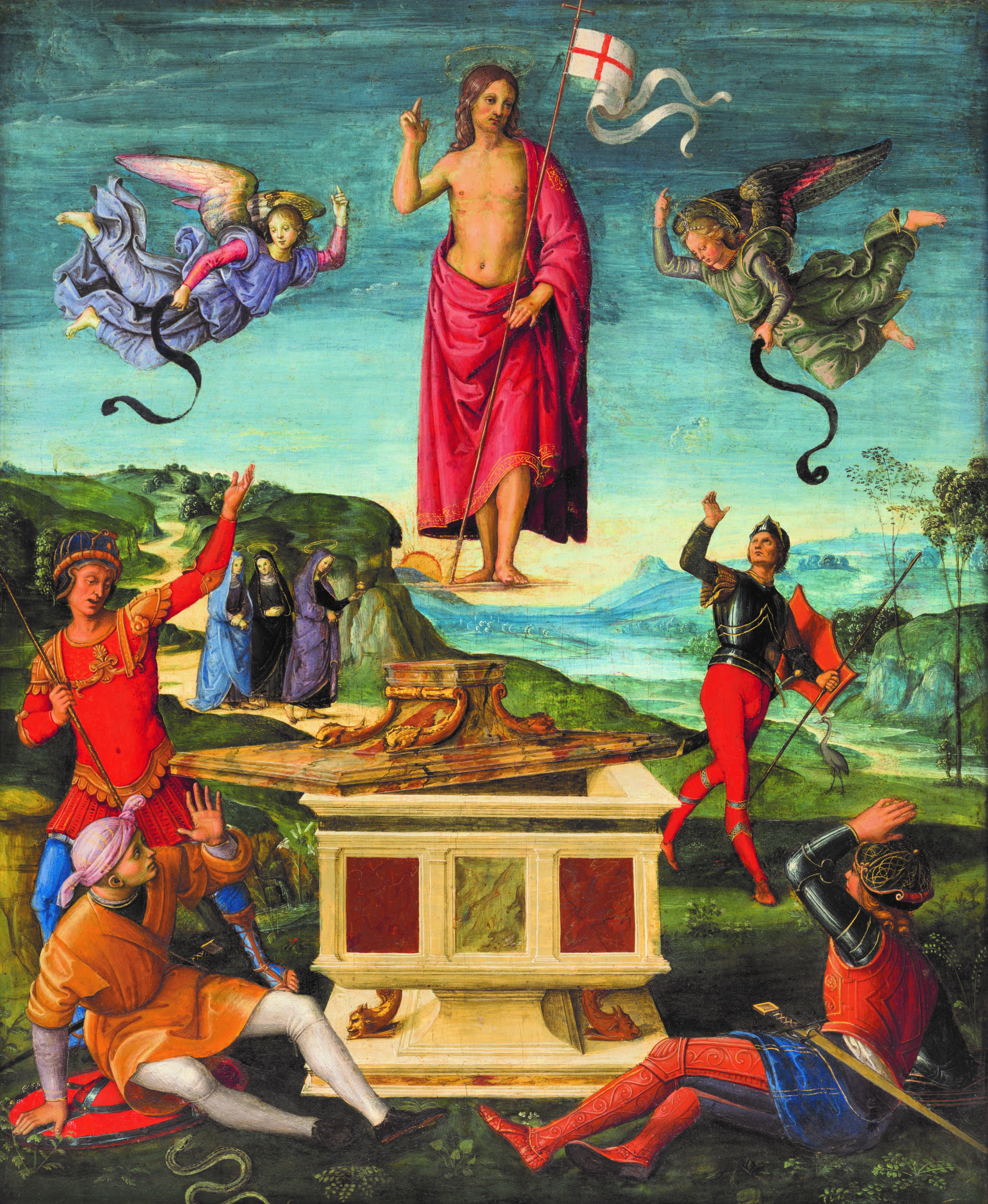
Depictions of the Resurrection of Jesus are central to Christian art (Resurrection of Christ by Raphael, 1499–1502).

The New Testament teaches that the resurrection of Jesus is a foundation of the Christian faith. Christians, through faith in the working of God are spiritually resurrected with Jesus, and are redeemed so that they may walk in a new way of life.

In the teachings of the apostolic Church, Jesus' resurrection was seen as heralding a new era. A systematic theology of the resurrection emerged prominently in the writings of Apostle Paul; it was not enough for Paul to simply repeat elementary teachings, but as Hebrews 6:1 states, "go beyond the initial teachings about Christ and advance to maturity". Fundamental to Pauline theology is the connection between Christ's resurrection and redemption. Paul explained the importance of the resurrection of Jesus as the cause and basis of the hope of Christians to share a similar experience in 1 Cor 15:20–22:

But Christ has indeed been raised from the dead, the firstfruits of those who have fallen asleep. For since death came through a man, the resurrection of the dead comes also through a man. For as in Adam all die, so in Christ all will be made alive.

If the cross stands at the center of Paul's theology, so does the resurrection: unless the one died the death of all, the all would have little to celebrate in the resurrection of the one. Paul taught that, just as Christians share in Jesus' death in baptism, so they will share in his resurrection for Jesus was designated the Son of God by his Resurrection. Paul's views went against the thoughts of the Greek philosophers to whom a bodily resurrection meant a new imprisonment in a corporeal body, which was what they wanted to avoid, given that for them the corporeal and the material fettered the spirit. At the same time, Paul believed that the newly resurrected body would be a spiritual body—immortal, glorified and powerful, in contrast to an earthly body which is mortal, dishonored and weak.

The Apostolic Fathers discussed the death and resurrection of Jesus, including Ignatius (50−115), Polycarp (69−155), and Justin Martyr (100−165). Following the conversion of Constantine and the liberating Edict of Milan in 313, the ecumenical councils of the 4th, 5th and 6th centuries, that focused on Christology helped shape the Christian understanding of the redemptive nature of resurrection, and influenced both the development of its iconography, and its use within liturgy.

== Nontrinitarian perspectives ==
The doctrine of the Trinity, including the belief that Jesus is a person of the Trinity, is not universally accepted among Christians. Nontrinitarian Christian groups include the Church of Jesus Christ of Latter-day Saints, Unitarians and Jehovah's Witnesses. Though modern nontrinitarian groups all reject the doctrine of the Trinity, their views still differ widely on the nature of Jesus. Some do not believe that Jesus is God, instead believing that he was a messenger from God, or prophet, or the perfect created human. This is the view espoused by ancient sects such as the Ebionites, and modern-day Unitarians.

== See also ==
- Chronology of Jesus
- Gospel harmony – Compiling events of the biblical gospels
- Great Commission – Instruction of Jesus to his disciples to spread the gospel
- Historical Jesus – Jesus as a historical person
- Holy Name of Jesus – Christian devotion
- Jesus in comparative mythology – Comparative mythology study of Jesus
- Jesus in Islam – Penultimate prophet in Islam
- Jewish views on Jesus – Judaism's views on the central figure of Christianity
