= Adrian Esquino Lisco =

Salvadoran activist and spiritual chief

Adrian Esquino Lisco (died September 8, 2007) was a Salvadoran activist and spiritual chief and advisor to El Salvador's indigenous community. Lisco rose to international prominence during the Salvadoran Civil War when he called attention to human rights atrocities committed against El Salvador's indigenous peoples, who number about 1 percent of the country's 7 million people.

== Early life ==
Adrian Esquino Lisco was born in Comarca San Ramon, in western Sonsonate Department, El Salvador. He was of indigenous Nahua heritage. Esquino Lisco's older brother had been killed during the suppression of the 1932 Salvadoran peasant uprising (also called La matanza) by the Salvadoran dictatorship. Esquino Lisco was described as a short, soft-spoken man who was less than 5 feet tall. He was a farmer and artisan by profession.

Esquino Lisco's father founded the Asociación Nacional de Indigenas de El Salvador (ANIS) in 1954. The main purpose of ANIS was to preserve the culture, customs and language of El Salvador's indigenous groups, including the Lenca, Maya and Nahua. The organization generally worked behind the scenes to preserve El Salvador's indigenous heritage. Many indigenous Salvadorans considered it too dangerous to speak their native languages or even wear traditional clothing ever since the massacre that ended the 1932 Salvadoran peasant uprising.

Adrian Esquino Lisco inherited the title of spiritual chief in 1976 and became head of the Asociación Nacional de Indigenas de El Salvador. He attended a number of indigenous peoples conferences during the late 1970s throughout the world.

Through Esquino Lisco's work, ANIS finally won legal recognition from the Salvadoran government of President José Napoleón Duarte in 1980.

== Salvadoran Civil War (1980 - 1992) ==
Adrian Esquino Lisco first appeared in international news coverage of the civil war when he began calling attention to the February 23, 1983 Salvadoran army-led attack on an indigenous farm cooperative in Las Hojas, El Salvador. Salvadoran soldiers captured 74 male villagers, tied their thumbs behind their backs, and shot them. A Salavadoran federal judge later reported just 18 dead.

An El Salvadoran federal human rights commission, charged with investigating the Las Hojas massacre and other violations, did not accomplish much, reportedly because of pressure from the country's army. The commanders of the Salavadoran troops at Las Hojas were given amnesty in the 1990s as part of a broader Central American peace plan.

Esquino Lisco and others blamed wealthy Salvadoran landowners for the atrocity at Las Hojas. Lisco accused influential landowners of using the army to destroy the Las Hojas cooperative. Landowners often considered the farm cooperatives to be subversive, even Communist. Attempts at farm reforms were begun in the late 1970s, but were soon halted, leading to resentment from both peasants and wealthy landowners.

Esquino Lisco once had an encounter with Colonel Elmer Gonzales Araujo, one of the leading commanders at Las Hojas. Gonzales Araujo reportedly told Lisco that his soldiers were defending themselves against "armed subversives." Lisco later told The New York Times that, "I asked the army high command how guerrillas could die with their hands tied behind their backs."

Esquino Lisco went to Washington D.C. at the height of the Salvadoran Civil War to draw attention to the war's atrocities. He soon found receptive supporters in the U.S. Congress, most notably Senator Ted Kennedy and U.S. Representative Joe Moakley. His work in Washington put pressure on the Salvadoran government. According to Francisco Acosta, a Salvadoran activist based in Maryland, Lisco's lobbying of Congress led to the release of more than 100 political prisoners from government custody.

== Death ==
Adrian Esquino Lisco died of complications from diabetes, including kidney failure, at a hospital in El Salvador's capital, San Salvador on September 8, 2007. He was 68 years old.

== See also ==
- Marina Manzanares Monjarás
- María Julia Hernández
- José Castellanos Contreras
