= Marina Manzanares Monjarás =

Salvadoran activist

Marina Manzanares Monjarás is a political activist in El Salvador. She has long been with the main opposition party Farabundo Martí National Liberation Front (Frente Farabundo Martí para la Liberación Nacional). On July 2, 2006, her parents Francisco Antonio Manzanares, 77, and Juana Monjarás de Manzanares, 75, were brutally murdered. Amnesty International launched a letter-writing campaign asking people to urge the President and Attorney General to conduct a thorough investigation and ensure the safety of Marina.

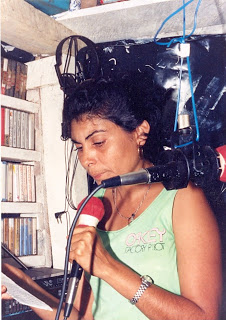
Marina Manzanares Monjarás, better known as "Mariposa" the official voice of the radio station 'venceremos"during the civil war in el salvador.

== See also ==
- El Salvador
- Adrian Esquino Lisco
- María Julia Hernández
- José Castellanos Contreras
