= List of ambassadors of Israel to Guatemala =

== List of ambassadors ==
- Mattanya Cohen 2017 - 2022
- Moshe Bachar 2013 - 2017
- Eliahu Lopez 2009 - 2013
- Isaac Bachman 2006 - 2009
- Yaacov Paran 2000 - 2006
- Shlomo Cohen 1993 - 2001
- Yaacov Deckel 1989 - 1993
- Azriel Gal-On 1986 - 1989
- Moshe Dayan (diplomat) 1981 - 1986
- Eliezer Armon 1977 - 1981
- Avigdor Shoham 1975 - 1977
- Aria Bustan 1971 - 1972
- Moshe Tov 1968 - 1971
- Ambassador Joshua Nissim Shai 1959 - 1964
- Minister Yossef Keisari (Non-Resident, Mexico City) 1954 - 1956
