= María Julia Hernández =

Salvadoran activist (1939–2007)

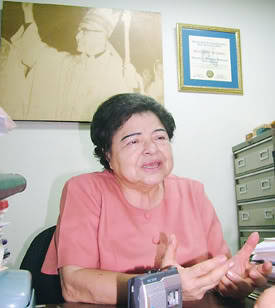
Maria Julia Hernandez. Fighter for justice and the defense of human rights. Collaborator with Archbishop Romero and initiator of the investigations of the El Mozote Massacre and the assassination of Saint Oscar Romero.

María Julia Hernández (January 30, 1939 – March 30, 2007) was a Salvadoran human rights advocate who tried to speak for victims of the civil war in El Salvador. She was the founding director of Tutela Legal, the human rights office of the Roman Catholic Archdiocese of San Salvador. Hernández was born in San Francisco Morazán, Honduras, to Salvadoran parents. Her family returned to El Salvador shortly after her birth. She never married but dedicated her life to the Catholic Church and its work among the people of El Salvador.

She spent 30 years gathering evidence of massacres and individual killings, interviewing survivors, seeing that they stayed alive and compiling a book of the dead. The book of the dead grew into more of an encyclopedia of political violence.

Hernández did her work in a sparsely furnished room decorated by a cross and two photographs of Archbishop Óscar Romero, the church leader who was assassinated in 1980 by right-wing forces in El Salvador. Romero was killed while celebrating Mass, after calling upon the army to stop the death squads who were attacking real and imagined opponents of the status quo.

The killing of the archbishop was among the opening shots of the civil war that lasted until 1992. It was a central event in the life of María Julia Hernández. Hernández worked with Romero, who was installed as bishop in 1977, at the start of a 15-year wave of violence that pitted a relative handful of left-wing guerillas against the ruling class, the armed forces and the government of El Salvador. Most of the 75,000 victims of the violence were peasants who were killed while passively resisting the powers of the state.

In 1991 Hernández was awarded the Pacem in Terris Award. It was named after a 1963 encyclical letter by Pope John XXIII that calls upon all people of good will to secure peace among all nations (Pacem in terris is Latin for 'Peace on Earth'.)

María Julia Hernández died on March 30, 2007, of a heart attack in San Salvador at the age of 68.

== See also ==
- José Castellanos Contreras
- Marina Manzanares Monjarás
