= Mattanya Cohen =

Israeli diplomat

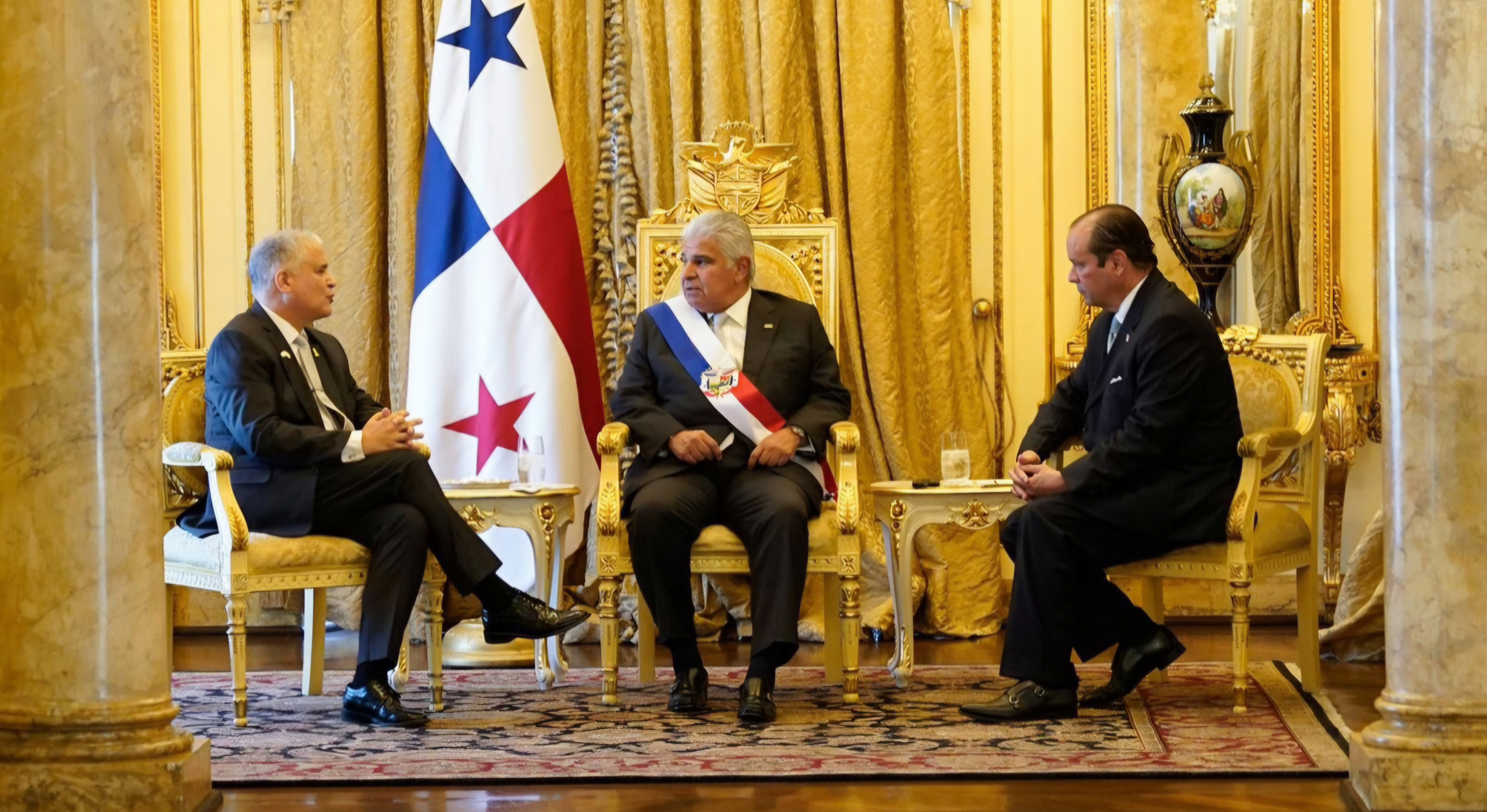
Presenting letter of credentials to Panamanian president Jose Raul Molino, August 2025

Mattanya (Matty) Cohen (Hebrew: מתניה כהן; born 1965) is an Israeli diplomat. He serves as the current ambassador of Israel to Panama, and non resident ambassador to Suriname, Barbados, Guyana and Trinidad and Tobago. He was the former Israeli ambassador to Guatemala, Honduras, El Salvador and Belize.

== Biography and personal background ==
He was born and raised in the Bet HaKerem neighborhood of Jerusalem and studied at Boyer High School. From 1983 to 1987, he served in the Israel Defense Forces (IDF), attaining the rank of captain. After completing his military service, he studied international relations at the Hebrew University in Jerusalem, earning a B.A. Degree. In 1991, he was admitted to the Israeli Ministry of Foreign Affairs cadet course and, upon completion, joined the foreign service. He speaks Hebrew, English, and Spanish.

== Career at the Israeli Ministry of Foreign Affairs ==
Cohen served as the deputy chief of mission of the Israeli embassy in Peru (1993–1996).

He served as the deputy chief of mission of the Israeli embassy in Cyprus (1996–1999). During his service in Cyprus, Cohen coordinated the historic visit of President Ezer Weizman in 1998, the first-ever visit of an Israeli president to the island. He was also in charge of organizing the events of the 50th anniversary of Israel, in Cyprus.

Back in Israel, Cohen was nominated as counselor at the department of Middle East economic affairs (1999–2001), and was responsible for developing economic and commercial ties between Israel, The Palestinian Authority, and Arab countries in the Middle East. He was working directly with the diplomatic missions of Israel in Egypt, Jordan, Oman, Qatar, Morocco, Tunisia, and Mauritania.

Cohen served as consul at the Israeli consulate general in Miami, Florida (2001–2005). During his service, he enhanced the relations with the Hispanic community in South Florida, and established the Hispanic department in the consulate, first-ever in the United States. In this period, the years of the second Intifada, he was very active in public diplomacy with different audiences, among them the evangelical churches.

Back in the Foreign Ministry in Jerusalem, Cohen was appointed in 2005 as deputy director of the South America department, and in 2006, was appointed as a director of the Central America and Caribbean department. In those years, he represented Israel in the general assemblies of the Organization of American States (OAS).

Cohen served as the Israeli ambassador to El Salvador and the non-resident ambassador to Belize (2007–2011). During his service, he led the efforts to bestow the Righteous Among the Nations title to the Salvadoran consul in Geneva during World War II, José Castellanos, who saved thousands of Jews during the Holocaust by giving them official citizenship documents of El Salvador. In 2010, Cohen awarded the Righteous Among the Nations medal to the Castellanos family. In 2009, Cohen accompanied former President of El Salvador, Antonio Saca, in his visit to Israel, and in 2010, he accompanied Belize Foreign Minister, Wilfred Elrington to Israel, first ever visit of a Belizean Foreign Minister to Israel since the two states established diplomatic relations in 1983. In 2011, Cohen was granted with the title Doctor honoris causa in international relations from Albert Einstein University in El Salvador.

In July 2011, Cohen returned to Israel, and was appointed as the head of the training department of Mashav (Israeli Agency for International Development Cooperation). His job included responsibility over hundreds of training activities in Israel and abroad. He was in charge of thousands of professionals who arrived to study in Israel from more than 100 developing countries. Cohen established trilateral cooperation activities, for the benefit of developing countries, with other donor countries, as well as international organizations.

Cohen served as Israeli ambassador to Guatemala and non-resident ambassador to Honduras (2017–2022). During his service in these two countries, he played a significant role in the decision of both governments to recognize Jerusalem as the capital of Israel, and to move their embassies to the city. Guatemala did it in May 2018 and Honduras in June 2021. Cohen initiated a campaign among mayors in Guatemala to name streets in their cities "Jerusalem Capital of Israel". Until now, there are 34 cities in Guatemala, including the capital Guatemala City that accepted the challenge, making Guatemala the first country in the world with streets bearing this name. He accompanied the visits in Israel of the Presidents of Guatemala, Jimmy Morales (May 2018 - Opening of the Guatemalan embassy in Jerusalem) and Alejandro Giammattei (December 2019) as well as President of Honduras, Juan Orlando Hernandez (September 2019 - Opening of the commercial office of Honduras in Jerusalem). To honor Israel for its 70th anniversary, he initiated the "Celebrate Israel Parade" in the streets of Guatemala City with thousands of participants. The parade has since then become an annual tradition. He is the author of the book “The Israeli Ambassador’s Opinion”, published in Spanish in Guatemala in 2022.

In 2023, he was appointed as General Coordinator of the official events marking the 75th anniversary of the State of Israel.

In 2024, he was appointed Head of Latin America and the Caribbean Bureau at the Ministry of Foreign Affairs in Jerusalem. Later that year, Cohen was the head of the Israeli delegation to the general assembly of the Organization of American States (OAS) held in Paraguay.

In 2025, he was appointed as the Israeli ambassador to Panama, and non resident ambassador to Suriname, Barbados, Guyana and Trinidad and Tobago.
