= History of the Jews in El Salvador =

The history of the Jews in El Salvador goes back to the 1500s, with the first Spanish conversos who practiced Judaism in secret.

Jews have been recognized by the government in El Salvador since the early 19th century, starting with Sephardic Jews and continuing with the arrival of refugees from Europe during World War II. Today, El Salvador has a community of around 100 to 300 Jews, the majority established in San Salvador.

== History of the Jews in El Salvador ==
There is a record of Jews in Latin America since colonial times. In El Salvador, there is a record of several Jewish immigrations from Portugal. After the independence of El Salvador, it is believed that the first Jewish immigrant was Bernardo Haas, born in Alsace. Subsequently, the first documented German Jew arrived in the country in 1888, according to academic Jessica Alpert. France and Central Europe were the main countries of origin of this contemporary Jewish migration.

Business partnership with Catholic conservative landlords during the 1930s hampered Jewish security, but the situation improved after World War II, and many Jews arrived, many thanks to the work of Colonel Castellanos who saved over 40,000 Jews from Central Europe by giving them visas and Salvadoran nationality. On Sept. 11, 1948, El Salvador recognized the State of Israel, and in 1956 the Instituto Cultural El Salvador-Israel was founded.

Jerusalén is a municipality in the La Paz department of El Salvador. It was named by the Cordova family, more specifically by Juan Cordova. They were Sephardic Jews who were expelled from Spain. Other Sephardic Jews are Escalantes, Figueroas, Figueiras, Perla, Galeas, Galeanos, Gomar, López, Perez, Taher and Taheri among others, some of them became members and founders of the Seventh-Day Adventist Church in the area of Morazan.

Right before the Salvadoran Civil War, the Jewish community was actively involved in organizing a Zionist Organization, of which Ernesto Liebes and Carlos Bernhard were its main leaders. Members of the community were also involved. According to American writer Jane Hunter in her book Israeli Foreign Policy: South Africa and Central America, in facilitating the sale of arms from Israel in El Salvador, particularly the sale of 18 Dassault Ouragan jetfighters aircraft in 1973, Liebes was perceived by guerrilla groups as the primary representative.

Prior to the Civil War, there were about 300 Jews in El Salvador, most of whom lived in the capital. During the Civil War many Jews left the country after the 1979 kidnap and murder of community leader and Israeli Honorary Consul for cultural relations Ernesto Liebes by the RN-FARN, the armed wing of the RN, one of the groups that formed the FMLN.

The Comunidad Israelita de El Salvador was established in 1943 with a Jewish community center opening in 1945 and a synagogue in 1949. The country also has several Orthodox synagogues including Beit Israel, San Salvador and Shmaya V'avtalion in the town of Armenia.

Some Salvadorans are descended from Crypto-Jews or Anusim, who were forced to convert to Christianity but maintained some Jewish traditions for generations. In recent years, some Anusim have returned to Judaism and formally converted, with the help of Jewish outreach organizations such as Kulanu.

Notable Salvadoran Jews include Benjamin Bloom, who funded the creation of the San Salvador hospital named after him. It serves all socioeconomic classes of the country with no preferential treatment.

== 1990s ==
The signing of peace treaties in 1992 led to the return of several Jewish couples with children who had moved elsewhere during the Salvadoran Civil War. A new community center and synagogue were inaugurated in the past decade. The Comunidad Israelita de El Salvador holds services on Friday, Shabbat morning, and on holy days. For Pesach, Rosh Hashannah, Sukkot, Channukah, Purim and Yom Ha'atzmaut, the women's committee organizes meals for the community to share and celebrate together.

University students have a Jewish students association, EJES (Estudiantes Judíos de El Salvador), and a Zionist group, FUSLA (Federación de Universitarios Sionistas de Latinoamérica), both of which are active throughout the year. For adults, the community offers different educational classes in Hebrew and other topics of interest. The "Chevra of Women" offers a course in Jewish cooking, and there is a monthly Jewish bulletin called el Kehilatón, which advertises synagogue events. The Noar Shelanu youth movement, to which about 30 children age 8–18 belong, meets weekly. The kindergarten for young children also meets weekly. Two emissaries teach Hebrew and Judaism.

== Relations with Israel ==
In 2006, El Salvador announced plans to move the embassy to Tel Aviv where the rest of the embassies are located. This met with controversy, with many believing this decision to be under the political influence of the then President, Tony Saca, who is of Christian Arab descent.

More recently, the current President has attracted tourists and investors from around the world including Israel through his country's adoption of Bitcoin alongside the USD.

== See also ==
- José Castellanos Contreras, diplomat who provided Salvadoran nationality papers to tens of thousands of Jews during World War II.
- Bernard Salomon Lewinsky, doctor and medical researcher, father of Monica Lewinsky, was born in El Salvador.

== References and notes ==
- Beker, Avi. "El Salvador." Jewish Communities of the World. Lerner Publications Company, Minneapolis, 1998.
- "El Salvador." Encyclopaedia Judaica.
- "El Salvador." la Unión Judía de Congregaciones de Latinoamérica y el Caribe
- Zaidner, Michael. Jewish Travel Guide. Vallentine Mitchell, Portland, 2000.
