= Comunidad Israelita de El Salvador =

Jewish synagogue in El Salvador

Sinagoga de El Salvador
- Hebrew: בית כנסת
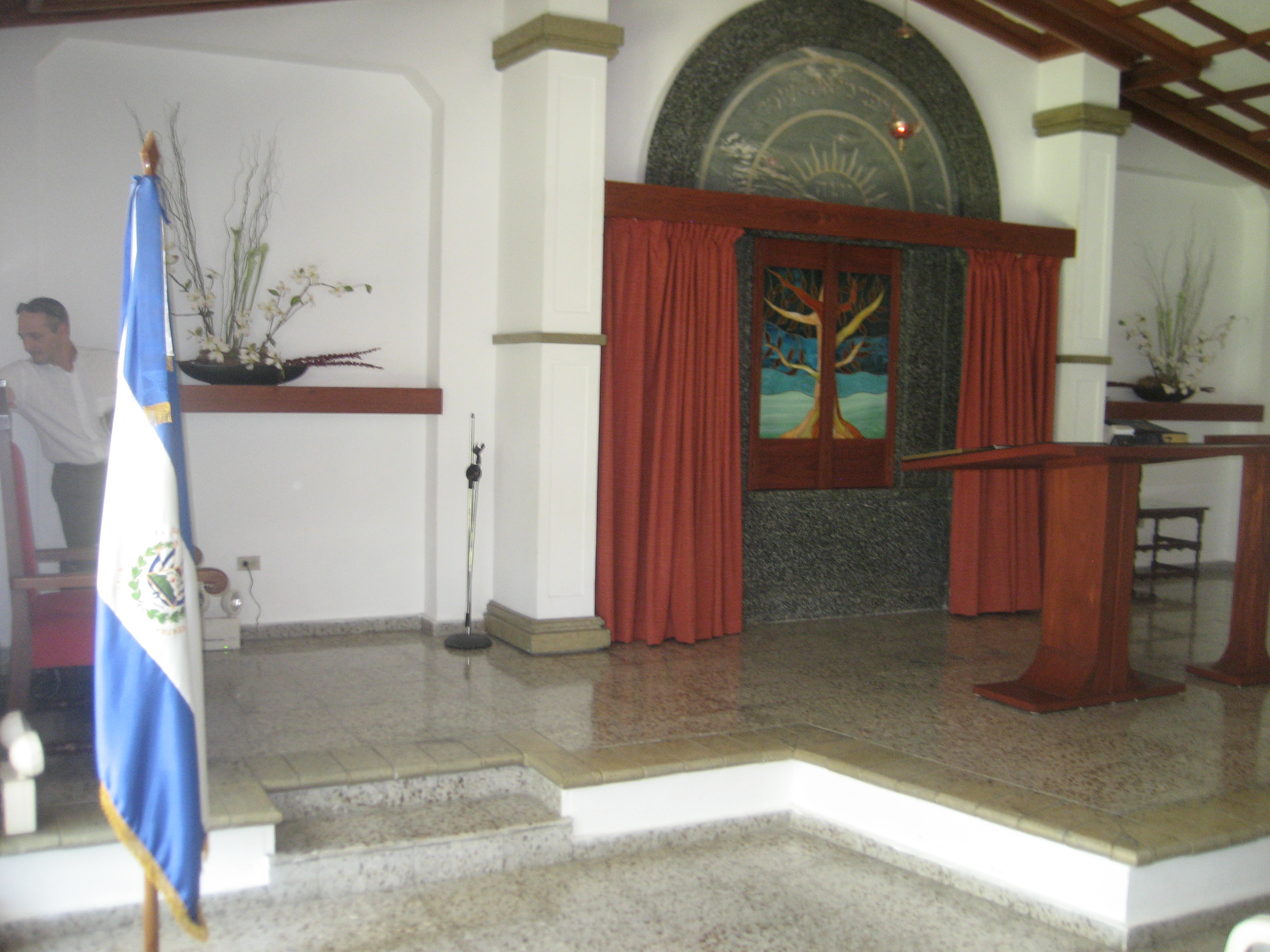
- The synagogue interior, in 2009

- Location of the synagogue in El Salvador

Religion
- Affiliation: Conservative Judaism
- Ecclesiastical or organizational status: Synagogue
- Leadership: Fernando Lapiduz (laity)
- Status: Active

Location
- Location: Boulevard del Hipódromo 626, San Salvador
- Country: El Salvador
- Interactive map of Sinagoga de El Salvador
- Coordinates: 13°41′41″N 89°14′32″W

Architecture
- Established: c. 1920s (as a congregation)
- Completed: 1949; 1952

The Comunidad Israelita de El Salvador (Hebrew: בית כנסת, lit. 'Jewish Community of El Salvador') is a Conservative Jewish congregation and synagogue, located in San Salvador, the capital of El Salvador.

== History ==
The congregation was established in the c. 1920s. The first synagogue was located in the city center in 1949; with the current building completed in 1952. Currently, the community center is located in the San Benito neighborhood of San Salvador. The congregation is the only Conservative congregation in the country. There are several Orthodox congregations.

== See also ==
- History of the Jews in El Salvador
- List of synagogues in El Salvador
