= Tsuriel Raphael =

Israeli diplomat

Tsuriel Raphael (Hebrew: צוריאל רפאל; born in 1952 in the United States) is an Israeli diplomat. He was recalled from the post of ambassador to El Salvador and non-resident ambassador to Belize following an incident in early 2007. It was his first ambassadorial posting as a career Israeli foreign service officer.

== Early life and education ==
Raphael was born in Los Angeles, California in 1952 and moved to Israel with his parents and brother in 1971. He studied at Tel Aviv University and in 1976 he received his B.A. in political science. Afterwards he served in the Israel Defense Forces.

== Career ==
In November 1981, Raphael started working at the Israel Ministry of Foreign Affairs in Jerusalem. Two years later, in 1983, he was part of the Israeli delegation to the 38th session of the General Assembly at the United Nations; afterwards, he was posted to the Embassy of Israel in Washington, D.C. In July 1990, Raphael was named to serve as Consul for Public Affairs for Israel's Consulate General to the Southwestern United States, based in Los Angeles, and later served as Deputy Consul General in the mid 1990s at Israel's Consulate General in New York City.

From 1998 to 2002 Raphael served as Deputy Chief of Mission at the Embassy of Israel in Madrid. He returned to Jerusalem in 2002, working as the director of the Israel Information Center, a department of the Foreign Ministry. His main responsibility included the preparation, editing and distribution of informational policy papers.

== 2007 incident ==
In 2006 Raphael was appointed ambassador to El Salvador and non resident ambassador to Belize. On 12 March 2007, it was announced that Raphael would be recalled after being found outside the embassy in San Salvador, drunk, hands tied, and mostly naked wearing only bondage gear. Police were able to determine his identity after removing a rubber ball gag from his mouth. Israel recalled him for "behavior that is unbecoming of a diplomat."
