= Emil Gustav Lisco =

Emil Gustav Lisco (January 13, 1819 – February 8, 1887) was a German Protestant Christian pastor.

Lisco was born in Berlin, the son of Friedrich Gustav Lisco, a pastor and theologian. From 1845 Emil became a pastor as well, also in Berlin. Among his more notable public positions was strident opposition to Copernican heliocentrism, against which he argued in an 1868 letter and in an 1872 lecture.
