= Friedrich Gustav Lisco =

German Protestant theologian

Friedrich Gustav Lisco (12 February 1791 – 5 July 1866) was a German Protestant Christian theologian born in Brandenburg an der Havel. His son, Emil Gustav Lisco, was also a preacher.

He studied at Viadrina University in Frankfurt and at the University of Berlin, where his instructors were Friedrich Schleiermacher, August Boeckh, Wilhelm Martin Leberecht de Wette and Johann Gottlieb Fichte, with the latter being an important influence to his career. From 1814 he worked as a preacher in Berlin. In 1839 he obtained an honorary doctorate from the University of Berlin.

== Selected works ==
- Die Parabeln Jesu (1832, fifth edition 1861); translated into English by Patrick Fairbairn and published as The Parables of Jesus Explained and Illustrated (1846).
- Das christliche Kirchenjahr (1834–35); 2 volumes.
- Die Bibel mit Erklärungen etc. (1852–53).
- Einleitung in die Bibel (1861).
