= José Castellanos Contreras =

Salvadoran diplomat, rescued Jews during Holocaust (1893-1977)

Colonel José Castellanos Contreras
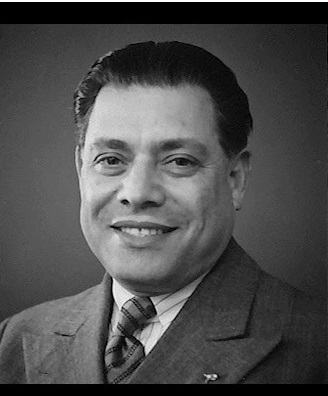
- Born: 23 December 1893; San Vicente, El Salvador
- Died: 18 June 1977 (aged 83); San Salvador, El Salvador
- Education: Escuela Politécnica Militar
- Spouse: Maria Schürmann
- Children: 3
- Military career
- Allegiance: El Salvador
- Branch: Salvadoran Army
- Service years: 1910–1936
- Rank: Colonel

José Arturo Castellanos Contreras (23 December 1893 — 18 June 1977) was a Salvadoran Army colonel and diplomat who, while working as El Salvador's Consul General for Geneva during World War II, and in conjunction with Jewish-Romanian businessman György Mandl, helped save up to 40,000 Central European Jews, most of them from Hungary, from Nazi persecution by providing them with fake Salvadoran citizenship certificates.

== Public life and achievements ==
Castellanos was born in the provincial city of San Vicente to General Adelino Castellanos and Isabel Contreras de Castellanos. Beginning in 1911, when he entered the Military Polytechnic School, Castellanos would spend over 25 active years in the Salvadoran military, eventually achieving the rank of Second Chief of the General Staff of the Army of the Republic. Subsequently he would serve as Salvadoran Consul General in the following locations: Liverpool, England, 1937; Hamburg, Germany, 1938; Geneva, Switzerland, 1942–45.

=== World War II ===
==== Work with György Mandl ====
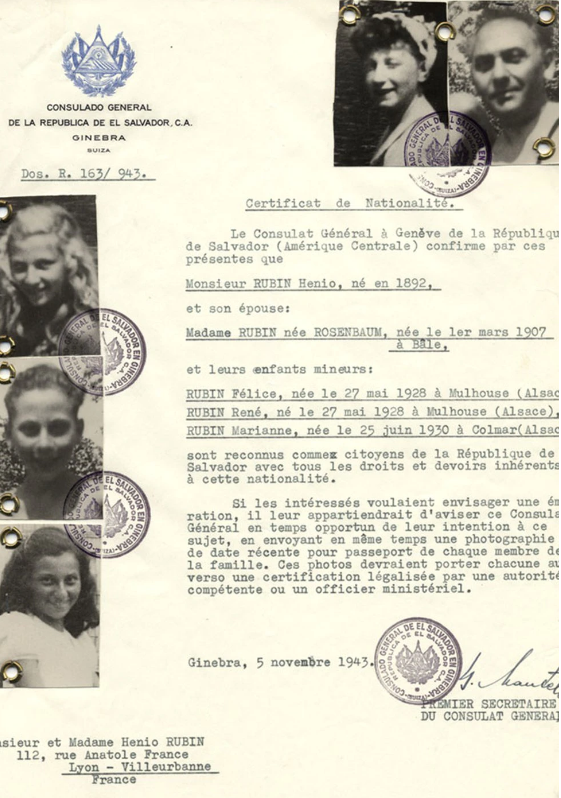
Representation of documents that were given to a Jewish family from Central Europe

It was during his time as consul in neutral Switzerland that Castellanos was approached by a Transylvanian-born Jewish businessman named György Mandl who reiterated to him the grave situation in which he, his family, and countless of his coreligionists found themselves. Castellanos, moved to help Mandl, gave him the ad hoc post of First Secretary to the Consul and had papers of Salvadoran nationality prepared for him and his family. Following a close call with the Gestapo in which the faux position and papers saved the family (who now bore the Italianate name of Mantello) from being sent to Auschwitz, Mandl (with Castellanos's consent) proceeded to secretly issue at least 13,000 "certificates of Salvadoran citizenship" to Central European Jews (principally through the Swiss Consular Office of Carl Lutz). The documents granted the bearers the right to seek and receive the protection of the International Red Cross and, eventually, of the Swiss Consul in Budapest; these guarantees, in effect, saved thousands of "Salvadorans" of Bulgarian, Czechoslovak, Hungarian, Polish, and Romanian extraction from Nazi depredations.

==== Rescue action ====
Castellanos had already granted several visas to people of Jewish origin who were persecuted by the Nazis. However, now it was part of a larger project: the handing over of false documents of Salvadoran nationality to people of Jewish origin. Castellanos then consulted Dr. Guerrero, who immediately agreed to that plan that saved the lives of thousands of Jews. According to the investigations, Dr. Guerrero would have contributed to writing the text of the document that was then given to them to save their lives.

=== Late recognition ===
After the war, Castellanos remained very discreet about his role in the rescue action, considering it to have been nothing out of the ordinary. His daughter, Frieda Castellanos Garcia, only learned about it from the media in 1974, at the age of 22.

The writer Leon Uris tracked down the retired diplomat in 1972 and interviewed him. This attracted the attention of the Salvadoran media, and Castellanos gave another brief radio interview in 1976, but otherwise he remained anonymous and his contribution went unrecognised until well after his death in 1977.

Castellanos' efforts on behalf of the Jews of Central Europe have been recognized at various times by the Anti-Defamation League, the American Jewish Committee, and the group Visas For Life. In 1995 President Bill Clinton, in a letter to the Anti-Defamation League, paid tribute to Colonel Castellanos and other members of the Salvadoran diplomatic corps, for their efforts in saving thousands from Nazi extermination. In 1999 the Jerusalem City Council honored Castellanos' granddaughter, Guadalupe Díaz de Razeghi, on the occasion of the inauguration of El Salvador Street in the neighborhood of Givat Masua.

After the Israeli Foreign Ministry and the Jewish Community of El Salvador have both applied to Israel's Holocaust Martyrs' and Heroes' Remembrance Authority", José Arturo Castellanos Contreras was recognized with the title of "Righteous Among the Nations" by Yad Vashem in 2010.

== Personal life ==
Castellanos married Maria Schürmann, a native of Switzerland, with whom he had a daughter and two sons.

After the war, Castellanos lived a quiet life and played down his role.

== See also ==
- El Salvador during World War II
- Geertruida Wijsmuller-Meijer
- Per Anger
- María Edwards
- Varian Fry
- Giorgio Perlasca
- Eduardo Propper de Callejón
- Ángel Sanz Briz
- Luiz Martins de Souza Dantas
- Aristides de Sousa Mendes
- Chiune Sugihara
- Raoul Wallenberg
- Jan Zwartendijk
- History of the Jews in the Dominican Republic
- History of the Jews in El Salvador
