= India–Israel relations =

Bilateral relations between India and Israel

- India: Israel

Diplomatic mission
- Embassy of India, Tel Aviv: Embassy of Israel, New Delhi

Envoy
- Ambassador J. P. Singh: Ambassador Reuven Azar

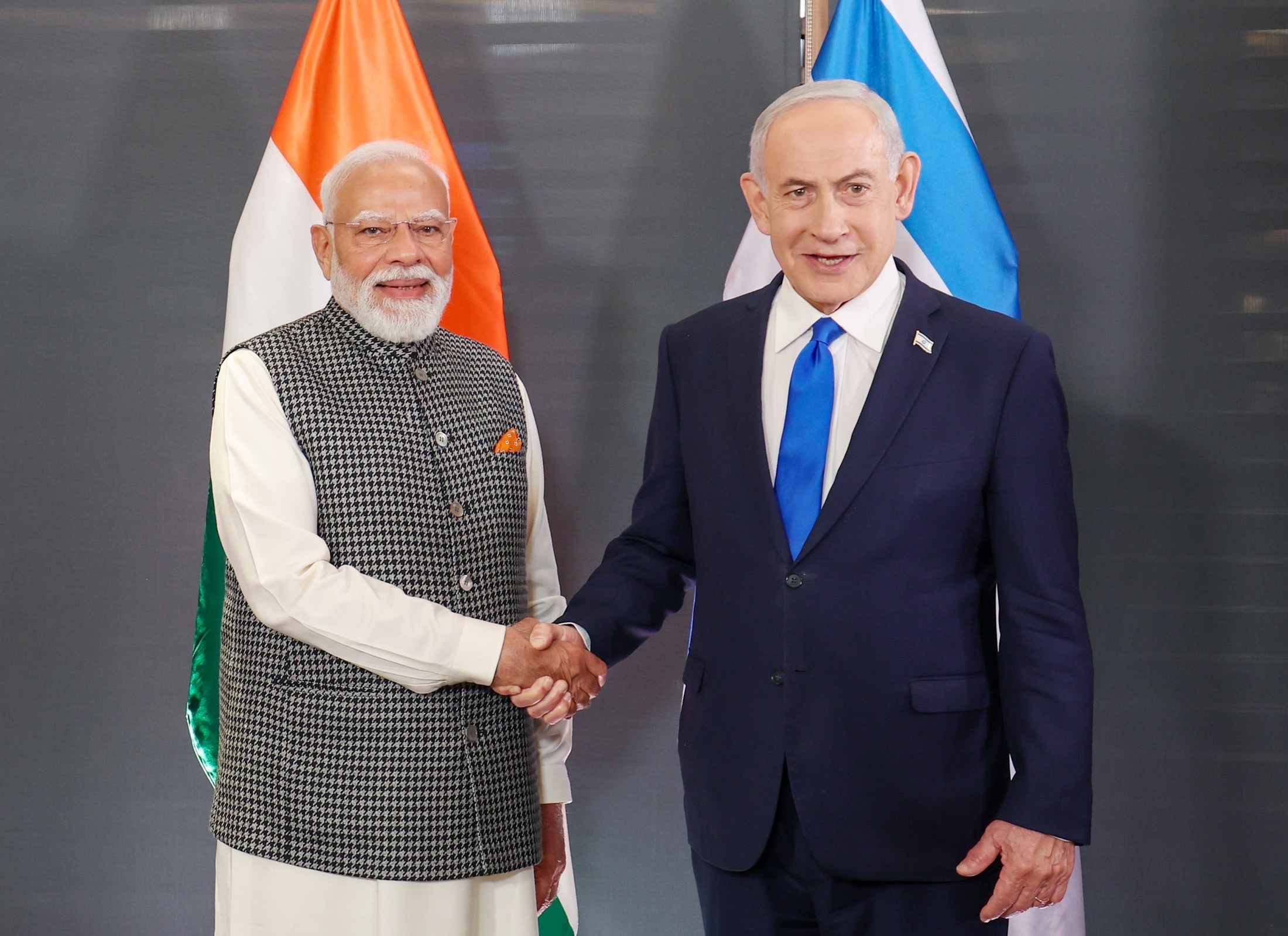
Israeli prime minister Benjamin Netanyahu meeting Indian prime minister Narendra Modi at Tel Aviv, 2026.

Since the 1990s, the Republic of India and the State of Israel have had a comprehensive economic, military, and political relationship. In 1947, India voted against the United Nations Partition Plan for Palestine, but nonetheless recognized Israeli sovereignty in 1950. Israel opened a consulate in Bombay in 1953. Collaboration gradually increased as Israel became a key Indian ally amidst the India–Pakistan conflict; Israel supplied India with armaments, ammunition, and intelligence during the Indo-Pakistani war of 1971 and the Indo-Pakistani war of 1999 (in Kargil). Full diplomatic relations were established in 1992, when India opened an embassy in Tel Aviv and Israel opened an embassy in New Delhi. Both countries are members of the I2U2 Group, formed in October 2021, and have stated that they have a strong bilateral relationship, sharing similarities in spirit and facing common challenges, increasingly cooperating in the industrial and technological sectors.

By 2019, India was Israel's third-largest Asian trade partner and tenth-largest overall trade partner – bilateral trade, excluding military sales, stood at around US$6.3 billion. As of 2015, both countries are negotiating an extensive bilateral free-trade agreement, focusing on areas such as information technology, biotechnology, and agriculture. As of 2022, India is Israel's largest client for military equipment sales, and Israel is India's second-largest supplier of military equipment after Russia; approximately 42.1% of all Israeli arms exports are received by India. Between the 1999 Kargil war and 2010, India has spent $9 billion on defense purchases from Israel. By 2022, Israel has spent $3.2 billion on crude oil and diamonds from India. Their strategic ties extend to joint military training as well as intelligence-sharing on the activity of various terrorist groups. Israel provided humanitarian aid to India after the 2001 Gujarat earthquake. Since the 2023 Hamas-led attack on Israel, India has reportedly been providing significant military assistance to Israel. One key area of support has been the provision of Hermes 900 drones. With increased tension between Iran and Israel in 2024, there has been a geopolitical shift by India away from Iran and towards Israel.

Israel is represented in India through an embassy in New Delhi as well as consulates in Mumbai and Bangalore. India is represented in Israel through an embassy in Tel Aviv; the Indian government does not currently recognize Jerusalem as Israel's capital city (see status of Jerusalem). In 2009, an international study on the Arab–Israeli conflict revealed that around 58 percent of Indian respondents sympathized with Israel—the most positive opinion of any country surveyed. In 2023, a survey revealed that Israelis hold the most favorable views of India among all countries surveyed. According to the data, 71% of Israeli respondents expressed a favorable opinion of India, while 20% held unfavorable views and 9% did not express an opinion.

== History ==
=== Ancient relations ===
Excavation at Tel Megiddo shows evidence of Indo-Mediterranean trade relations from mid-second millennium BCE between the Indian subcontinent- and southern Levant-based on the presence of turmeric, banana, sesame, all originating from the Indian subcontinent. Geographical analysis suggests that the Hebrew Bible (Old Testament) may be talking about India, where the trade of animals such as monkeys and peacocks existed. According to Chaim Menachem Rabin, the connection between ancient Israel and the Indian subcontinent was recorded during the reign of King Solomon (10th century BCE) in Book of Kings 10.22. Ancient trade and cultural communication between India and the Levant is documented in the Periplus of the Erythraean Sea and the accounts surrounding Queen of Sheba in the Hebrew Bible. Jews who have settled in Kochi, Kerala, trace their origin back to the time of King Solomon and are called Cochin Jews. Later on, Paradesi Jews migrated to Kochi, Kerala, during the 15th and 16th centuries following the expulsion of Jews from the Iberian peninsula (comprising both Spain and Portugal).

Trade relations can be traced back to 1,000 BCE and earlier to the time of the Indus Valley Civilization of the Indian subcontinent and the Babylonian culture of the Middle East. A Buddhist story describes Indian merchants visiting Baveru (Babylonia) and selling peacocks for public display. Similar, earlier accounts describe monkeys exhibited to the public. Trade connections between India and Palestine and Mediterranean Jewish communities continued, and later, the languages of these cultures started to share linguistic similarities.

Judea played a minor role in trade between the Roman Empire and India during the period of Roman rule in Judaea. It is known that there were expensive garments in the Temple in Jerusalem imported from India via Alexandria (in present-day Egypt).

=== Non-recognition period (1948–1950) ===
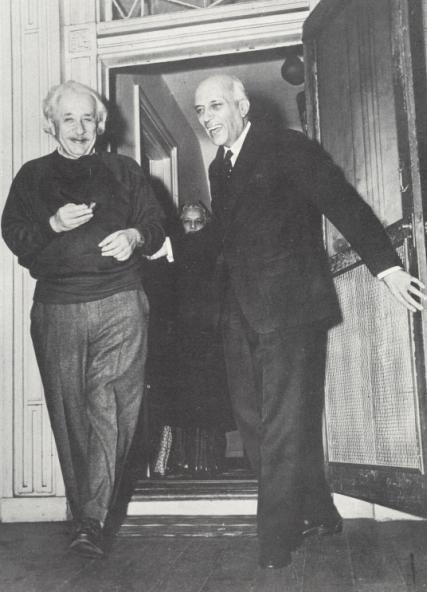
Albert Einstein with Jawaharlal Nehru in Princeton, New Jersey, United States, in 1949

Hermann Kallenbach (1 March 1871 – 25 March 1945) was a Lithuanian-born Jewish South African architect who was one of the foremost friends and associates of Mahatma Gandhi. Kallenbach was introduced to the young Mohandas Gandhi while they were both working in South Africa and, after a series of discussions, they developed a long-lasting association. As a Zionist, Kallenbach planned to accompany Gandhi to India in 1914, but with the outbreak of World War I, he was interned as an enemy alien at detention camps and shifted to the Isle of Man as a prisoner of war from 1915 until 1917. After the war he returned to South Africa, where he resumed his work as an architect and continued to correspond with Gandhi. The rise of Nazism and Adolf Hitler's anti-Semitic propaganda shocked Kallenbach into a rediscovery of his Jewish roots. He became a Zionist and served on the executive board of the South African Zionist Federation and planned to settle in Palestine ("Eretz Israel" in Hebrew). He wanted society there to involve no state, military, or industry, in order to avoid colonialism through Zionist settlements. At the request of Moshe Shertok (Sharett), Kallenbach visited Gandhi in May 1937 to enlist his sympathy and support for Zionism. The architect once again became a simple man, participating in all the activities of Gandhi's ashram life. Kallenbach wrote, "I join the whole programme... It is 'almost' as the old joint life, as if the 23 years, with all the events that affected millions of people, had disappeared." Kallenbach disagreed with Gandhi over Zionism and the need to violently resist Hitler. Nevertheless, Kallenbach continued his deep friendship with Gandhi, visiting him again in 1939

India's position on the establishment of the State of Israel was affected by many factors, including India's own partition on religious lines, and India's relationship with other nations. Indian independence leader Mahatma Gandhi believed the Jews had a good case and a prior claim for Israel, but opposed the creation of Israel on religious or mandated terms. Gandhi believed that the Arabs were the "rightful occupants" of Palestine, and was of the view that the Jews should return to their countries of origin. Albert Einstein wrote a four-page letter to Jawaharlal Nehru on 13 June 1947, to persuade India to support the setting up of a Jewish state. Nehru, however, couldn't accept Einstein's request, and explained his dilemma stating that national leaders "have to unfortunately pursue policies that are essentially selfish". India voted against the partitioning of Palestine plan of 1947 and voted against Israel's admission to the United Nations in 1949.

B.R Ambedkar wrote an essay where he said that Jews "must be destined to have their land of promise". He sympathised with Jewish national movement and said that he "trusted that Jews reached their promised land".

Various proponents of Hindutva supported or sympathised with the creation of Israel. Hindu Mahasabha leader Veer Savarkar supported the creation of Israel on both moral and political grounds, and condemned and deplored India's vote at the UN against Israel. Rashtriya Swayamsevak Sangh leader Madhav Sadashiv Golwalkar admired Jewish nationalism and believed Palestine was the natural territory of the Jewish people, essential to their aspiration for nationhood.

=== Informal recognition (1950–1991) ===
On 17 September 1950, India officially recognised the State of Israel. Indian Prime Minister Jawaharlal Nehru stated, "We would have [recognised Israel] long ago, because Israel is a fact. We refrained because of our desire not to offend the sentiments of our friends in the Arab countries." In 1953, Israel was permitted to open a consulate in Bombay (now Mumbai).

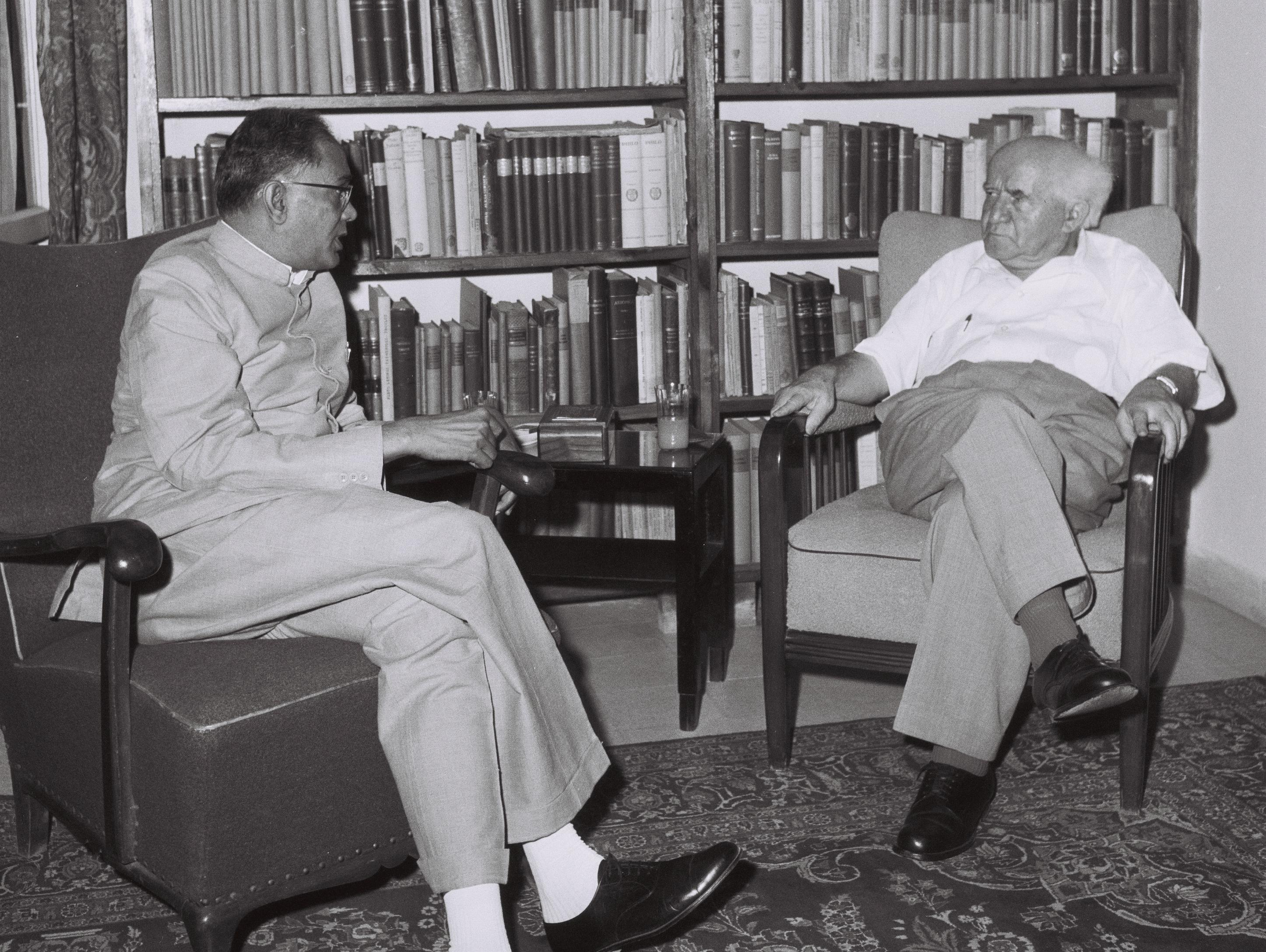
Jayaprakash Narayan meeting David Ben-Gurion, 1958

During the Six-Day War India took a pro-Arab stance. Israel supported India during the Indo-Pakistani War of 1971. Israeli arms manufacturer Shlomo Zabludowicz provided India and the Bengali nationalist and Bangladeshi independence organization Mukti Bahini with mortars, ammunition and instructors. India's opposition to official diplomatic relations stemmed from domestic and foreign considerations. Some analysts have said that Indian politicians feared that normalising ties with Israel would cost them Muslim votes, a stance which Hindu nationalist critics called "appeasement".

Additionally, India did not want to jeopardise its citizens working in Arab states of the Persian Gulf, who were helping India maintain its foreign-exchange reserves. India's domestic need for energy was another reason, in order to safeguard the flow of oil from Arab nations. India's foreign policy goals and alliances also proved problematic to formal relations with Israel, including India's support for the pro-Palestine Liberation Organization Non-Aligned Movement, India's tilt towards the Soviet Union during the Cold War, and India's desire to counter Pakistan's influence with the Arab states. On an ideological level, the dominant political party in India during this era, namely the Indian National Congress, opposed Israel due to their perception that it was a state based on religion, analogous to Pakistan.

Although there was no formal relationship for several decades, meetings and cooperation took place between both countries, including figures such as Moshe Dayan. Israel also provided India with crucial information during its multiple wars.

=== Full recognition (1992–2022) ===
After decades of non-aligned and pro-Arab policy, India formally established relations with Israel when it opened an embassy in Tel Aviv in January 1992. Ties between the two nations have flourished since, primarily due to common strategic interests and security threats, particularly from terrorism. In 1999, Israel supported India in the Kargil war by providing arms and ammunition. The formation of Organisation of Islamic Cooperation (OIC), which allegedly neglected the sentiments of Indian Muslims, and the blocking of India by Pakistan from joining the OIC are considered to be the causes of this diplomatic shift. On a diplomatic level, India and Israel have maintained healthy relations, despite the UPA government's continued criticism of Israeli military actions in Palestinian territories.

Since his election in 2014, the Modi government has maintained a de-hyphenation policy, where it keeps its relations with Israel and Palestine independent from each other. At the height of the 2014 Israel–Gaza war, India blamed both sides and asked Israel to "stop disproportionate use of force." External Affairs Minister Sushma Swaraj insisted that there was no change in India's policy of supporting the Palestinian cause while maintaining good relations with Israel. Nevertheless, India joined other BRICS nations in voting at the United Nations Human Rights Council for a probe into alleged human rights violations in Gaza, which generated mixed response among media and analysts in India. When the UNHRC report alleging that Israel had committed war crimes was tabled for vote, India abstained from voting, one of five countries to do so. Israeli envoy to India Daniel Carmon thanked India for not supporting what he described as another anti-Israel bashing resolution.

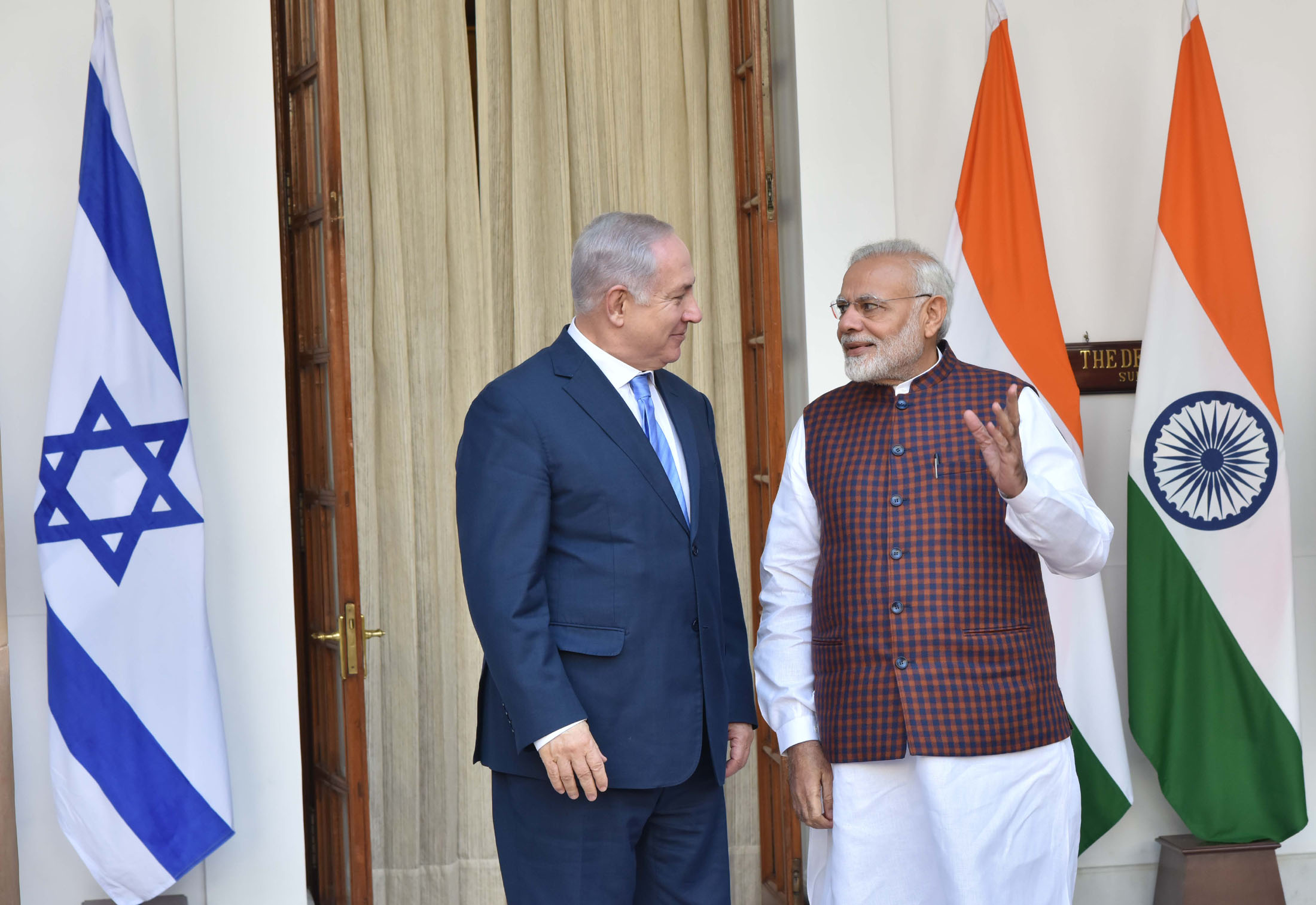
Indian prime minister Narendra Modi with Israeli prime minister Benjamin Netanyahu in New Delhi, India, January 2018

India–Israel relationship has been coridal under the premiership of Narendra Modi since 2014. In 2017, he was the first ever Prime Minister of India to visit Israel. India was the largest arms customer of Israel in 2017. Defence relations between the two countries are longstanding.

India voted in favour of Israel's resolution to deny observer status to Palestinian non-governmental organization Shahed at the United Nations Economic and Social Council (ECOSOC) on 6 June 2019.

In August 2022, President Isaac Herzog joined the Indian Embassy in Tel Aviv for its 75th Independence Day celebrations. In his speech, he welcomed India's rise as a regional and global power and described Israel and India as two modern republics proudly bound together by creativity and democracy, by ingenuity coupled with deep respect for timeless faiths and belief systems. Meeting Indian External Affairs Minister Subrahmanyam Jaishankar, Herzog underscored his personal commitment to strengthening the India–Israel relationship.

=== Post-7 October 2023 ===
Despite Indian leaders' opposition to Israel in the past, India in 2025 is a strong ally of Israel. India was one of the first countries to condemn the October 7 attacks on Israel by Hamas and other Palestinian groups designated as terrorists. Three weeks after the attack, India abstained in the vote on UN General Assembly Resolution ES-10/21 calling for an immediate and unconditional ceasefire because it did not explicitly condemn Hamas. In 2025, the opposition Indian National Congress criticised Prime Minister Narendra Modi for his stance on the Gaza war.

Israel condemned the Pahalgam terrorist attack on 22 April 2025 and expressed support for India. On 7 May 2025, Israel publicly praised India's airstrikes on terrorists, which were launched in retaliation for the Pahalgam massacre. The Israeli government described the operation as a "measured and decisive response to terrorism" and reaffirmed its support for India's right to self-defence, adding, "Israel supports India's right for self defense". Terrorists should know there's no place to hide from their heinous crimes against the innocent." The airstrikes, part of what was reported as Operation Sindoor, targeted terrorist launchpads and infrastructure across the Line of Control.

==== Military aid ====
India has reportedly been exporting rockets, drones like Elbit Hermes 900, explosives and other military equipment to Israel during the Gaza war. A cargo ship, laden with over 30 tons of such supplies intended for the Israeli Defense Forces, was reported off the coast of Spain. This ship, which had set sail from southeastern India, was en route to Ashdod. However, Spain refused to give the ship a port call.

== Diplomatic visits ==
=== 1997 ===
Ezer Weizman became the first Israeli president to visit India in 1997.

=== 2000 ===
In 2000, L.K. Advani became the first Indian Home Minister to visit the state of Israel.

Later that year, Jaswant Singh became the first Indian Foreign Minister to visit Israel. Following the visit, the two countries set up a joint anti-terror commission. The foreign ministers of the two countries said intensified co-operation would range from counter-terrorism to information technology.

=== 2003 ===
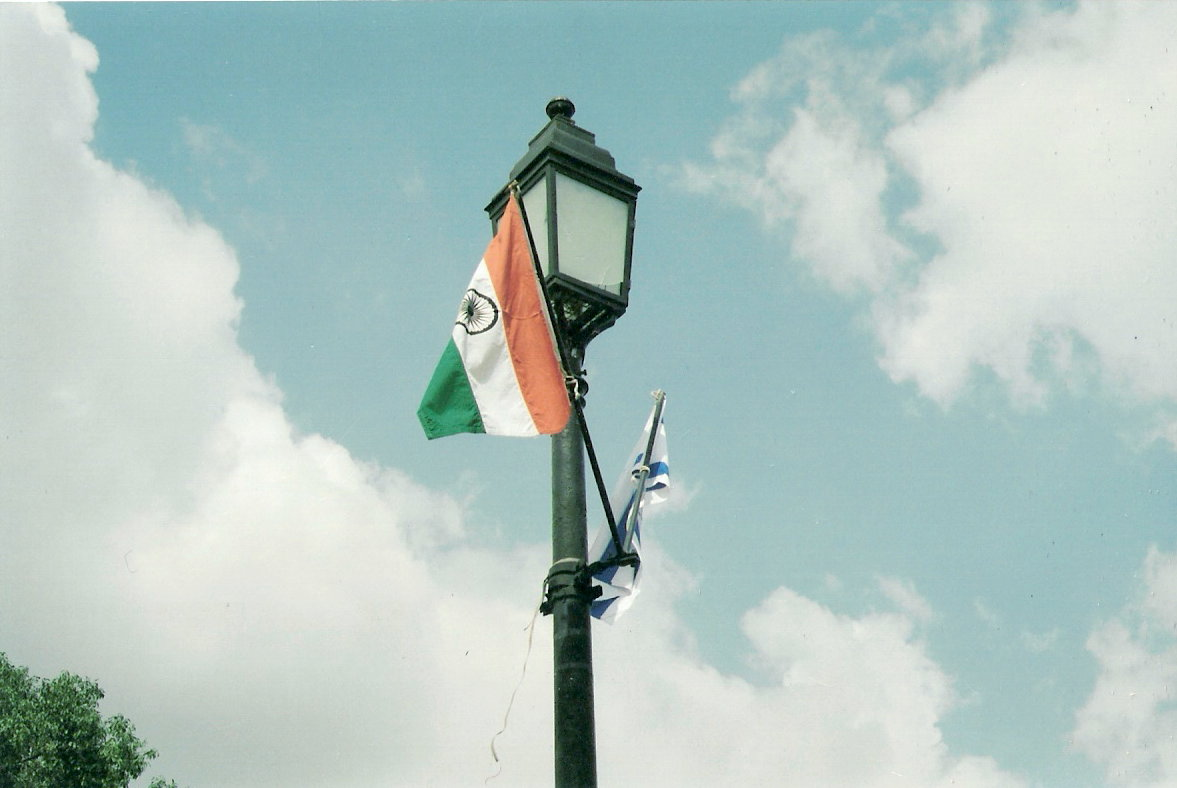
Israeli and Indian flags in New Delhi during Ariel Sharon's visit, September 2003

In 2003, Ariel Sharon was the first Israeli Prime Minister to visit India. He was welcomed by the Bharatiya Janata Party (BJP) led National Democratic Alliance coalition government of India. Several newspapers expressed positive views on his visit, and Indian Prime Minister Atal Bihari Vajpayee voiced confidence that Sharon's visit would pave the way for further consolidating bilateral ties. Sharon's visit was condemned in leftist and Muslim circles. Hundreds of supporters of India's various communist parties rallied in New Delhi while nearly 100 Muslims were arrested in Mumbai. Students of Aligarh Muslim University demanded that India sever ties with Israel and increase ties with Palestine. The Hindi-language daily Navbharat Times called Sharon an important friend of India. The Hindu nationalist Rashtriya Swayamsevak Sangh (RSS) condemned the protest against Sharon. Sharon expressed satisfaction over his talks with Indian leaders. Indian prime minister Atal Bihari Vajpayee said the visit would increase ties between India and Israel. Sharon invited Vajpayee to visit Israel. Sharon said that Israelis regard India to be one of the most important countries in the world, and Vajpayee was sure that Sharon's visit would bring the two countries closer together.

=== 2006 ===
In early 2006 Indian government ministers Sharad Pawar, Kapil Sibal, and Kamal Nath visited Israel. Then-Gujarat Chief Minister Narendra Modi visited Israel in October 2006.

=== 2012 ===
Despite India's "unwavering support for the Palestinian cause", Foreign Minister S.M. Krishna made a two-day visit to Israel in 2012. The Israeli PM deemed this visit by Krishna a historical step forward in developing the relations between the two nations.

=== 2014 ===
In May 2014, after the victory of Narendra Modi in the 2014 general election Israeli PM Benjamin Netanyahu personally congratulated Modi. Modi in turn met his Israeli counterpart Benjamin Netanyahu in New York City on the sideline of the UN General Assembly during his US visit in 2014. This was the first meeting between the prime ministers of the two countries in over a decade. On the occasion of the Hanukkah festival, Indian PM Modi greeted his Israeli counterpart in Hebrew on Twitter while the Israeli PM replied in Hindi.

Indian Home Minister Rajnath Singh visited Israel in November 2014 to observe the country's border security arrangements. During his tour he also met Israeli PM Netanyahu. Breaking from convention, Singh was the first Indian minister to visit Israel without also visiting Palestine on the same trip. In the same year, former Israeli president Shimon Peres visited India. A high level Israeli delegation with the Agriculture Minister of Israel, Yair Shamir, also participated in the Vibrant Gujarat summit in 2015. In December 2014, a news article was published in The Hindu which stated that India may end support to Palestine at the UN.

=== 2015 ===
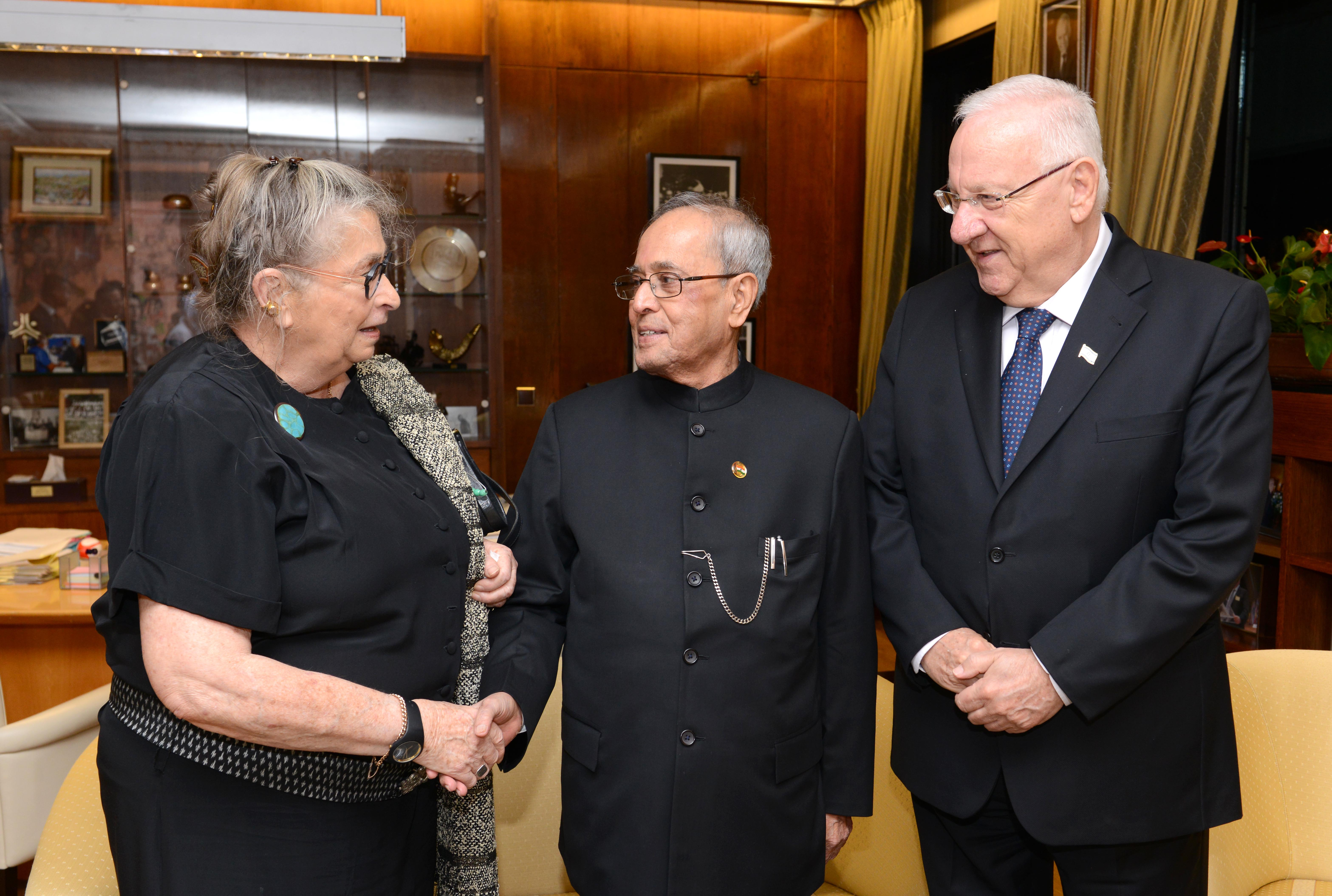
13th President of India Pranab Mukherjee with 10th President of Israel Reuven Rivlin and Nechama Rivlin in 2015

In February 2015 Israeli Defence Minister Moshe Ya'alon came to India. During his visit he participated in Aero India 2015. He also met his Indian counterpart, as well as the Indian PM. Pranab Mukherjee became the first president of India to visit Israel from 13 to 15 October 2015. Mukherjee was given the rare honour of addressing the Knesset.

=== 2016 ===
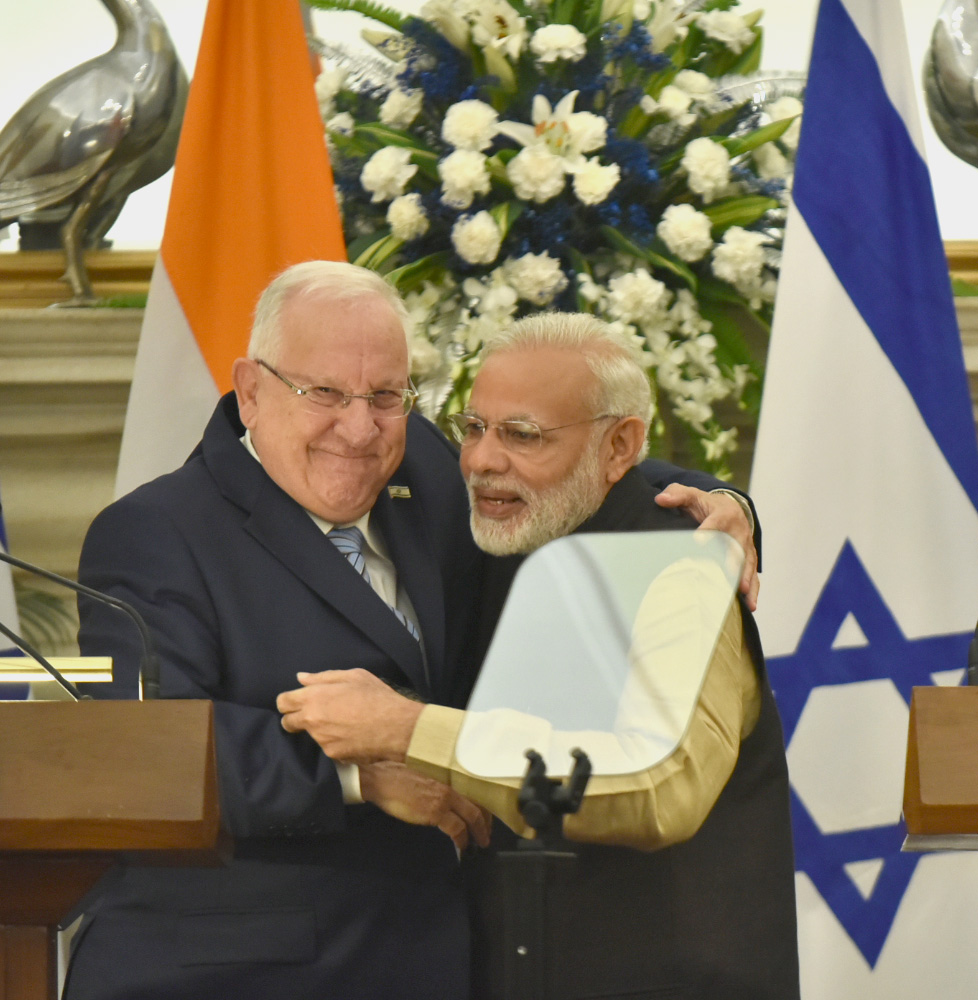
Israeli president Reuven Rivlin (left) with Indian prime minister Narendra Modi, during a joint press briefing in New Delhi; November 2016

Foreign Minister Sushma Swaraj visited Israel in January 2016. During the visit, she visited the Yad Vashem Holocaust Memorial in Jerusalem, and met with Prime Minister Benjamin Netanyahu, President Reuven Rivlin, members of the cabinet, and the Indian Jewish communities in Israel.

In September 2016, Indian Minister of Agriculture, Radha Mohan Singh visited Israel to bolster India-Israel agricultural ties. He met his Israeli counterpart Uri Ariel, where the discussion concerned about collaborative opportunities in agriculture between both the countries.

Israeli president Reuven Rivlin visited India for a week-long state visit in November 2016, becoming the second Israeli president to visit the country. Rivlin visited New Delhi, Agra, Karnal, Chandigarh and Mumbai. He spent the last day of his visit in Mumbai paying homage to the victims of the 2008 Mumbai attacks, and meeting with the Indian Jewish community. Israel currently regards Iran as a major threat to its national security, and Rivlin expressed this concern in meetings with Prime Minister Modi. Following his visit, Rivlin told Israeli media that despite growing economic ties with both countries, the Indian government had assured him that India would support Israel despite the former's relations with Iran. Rivlin told The Jerusalem Post, "They assure us that when the time will come they will never, never, ever let anyone act against the existence of Israel."

=== 2021 ===
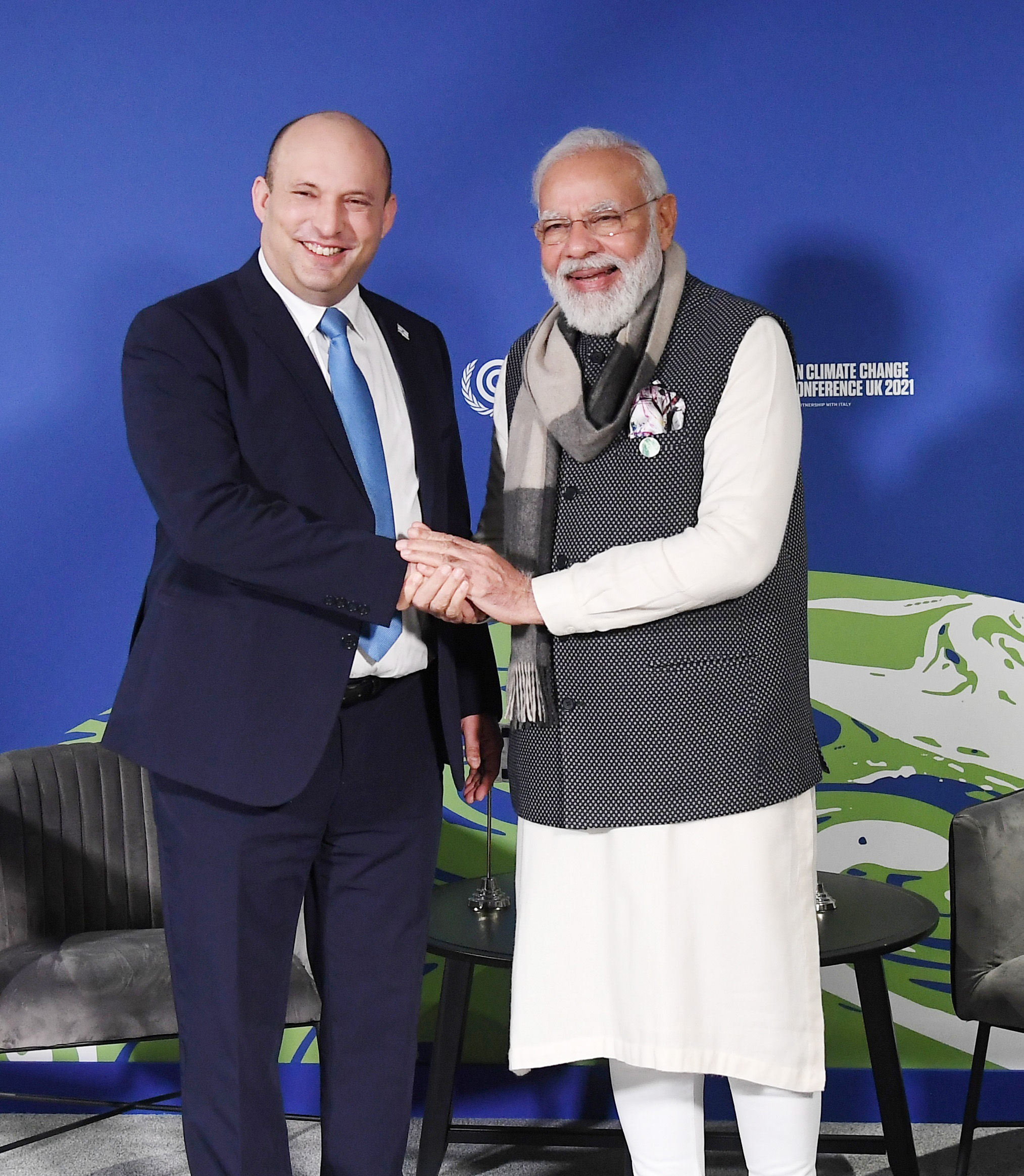
Israeli prime minister Naftali Bennett meeting Indian prime minister Narendra Modi at COP26 in the city of Glasgow (November 2021)

In October 2021, India's Minister of External Affairs, S. Jaishankar, made his first visit to Israel since taking office.

=== 2023 ===
After the October 7 attacks, Israel's ambassador to India, Naor Gilon, highlighted the overwhelming support for Israel from Indians. He stated, "If you look at the Israeli Embassy's social media, it's amazing. I could have another IDF with Indian volunteers. Everyone is telling me that they want to volunteer and go to fight for Israel. This level of support is unprecedented for me. The closeness between India and Israel is something I cannot explain." Indian prime minister Narendra Modi and his Bharatiya Janata Party took a strong pro-Israel position, which was seen as motivated by a desire to shore up political support from Hindu voters, forge closer ties with the United States which tends to favor Israel, and India's past experiences with terrorism. Indians are consequently widely viewed as being exceptionally supportive of Israel. At the same time Israelis were widely viewed as being appreciative of the support.

A growing diaspora of Indians also fill the ranks of Israel. By 2024 Indians made up the largest share of foreign students in Israel. They are also a growing source of manual labour.

== Official state visits ==
=== Narendra Modi's visit to Israel (2017) ===
In July 2017, Narendra Modi became the first ever Indian prime minister to visit Israel. It was noted that Prime Minister Modi did not visit Palestine during the trip, breaking from convention. With the sole exception of Union Minister Rajnath Singh, previous trips by Indian ministers and President Mukherjee included visits to both Israel and Palestine. The Indian media described the move as the dehyphenation of India's relations with the two states.

As a personal gesture, Israel named a new type of Chrysanthemum flower after Narendra Modi. The media houses of both countries had termed the visit to be historic. During the visit, India and Israel signed 7 Memoranda of Understanding (MoUs), which are listed as below:

1. MoU for setting up of India-Israel Industrial Research and Development and Technological Innovation Fund (I4F)
2. MoU for Water Conservation in India
3. MoU on State Water Utility Reform in India
4. India-Israel Development Cooperation – 3-year work program in Agriculture 2018–2020
5. Plan of cooperation regarding atomic clocks
6. MoU regarding cooperation in GEO-LEO optical link
7. MoU regarding cooperation in Electric Propulsion for Small Satellites

India and Israel also signed an agreement, upgrading their bilateral relations to a strategic partnership. During the trip, Prime Minister Modi also addressed the Indian diaspora in Israel in a highly televised event in Tel Aviv. In illustrating an Indian welcome to the Indian diaspora from its homeland, he announced Overseas Citizenship of India cards for Jews of Indian origin who had completed their compulsory military service in the Israel Defense Force and also pledged the construction of a major Indian cultural centre in Tel Aviv. Modi also visited the northern Israeli city of Haifa, where he paid homage to the Indian soldiers who died in the 1918 Battle of Haifa, and unveiled a special plaque commemorating the steadfast military leadership of Major Dalpat Singh who liberated the ancient city from the Ottoman Empire.

=== Benjamin Netanyahu's visit to India (2018) ===
In January, to commemorate 25 years of Indian-Israeli relations, a highly televised visit of the Israeli prime minister, Benjamin Netanyahu to India took place, during which both Netanyahu and India's prime minister Modi have exchanged mutual applauses. This visit was the first since the 2003 visit of Ariel Sharon to India. Netanyahu, accompanied by a 130-member delegation, the largest that has ever accompanied a visiting Israeli premier, wants to increase exports to India by 25 percent over the three years. Israel is to invest $68.6 million in areas such as tourism, technology, agriculture and innovation over a period of four years, a senior Israeli official had said ahead of the visit.

During this visit, an official commemoration ceremony took place, that honoured the Indian soldiers who perished in the Battle of Haifa during World War I took place, where Teen Murti Chowk, representing the Hyderabad, Jodhpur and Mysore lancers, was renamed 'Teen Murti Haifa Chowk', after the Israeli port city of Haifa. During the official visit by the Israeli prime minister, the two countries signed 9 MoUs in the fields of cybersecurity, oil & gas production, air transport, homeopathic medicine, film production, space technology and innovation, he also met with the heads of the Bollywood movie industry. Netanyahu's Indian visit also included efforts to revive Rafael missiles for Delhi. Netanyahu was also the guest of honour, and delivered the inaugural address at India's annual strategic and diplomatic conference, Raisina Dialogue, where he highlighted various aspects of Israel's success story as a high-tech and innovation-based economy, and also spoke about challenges plaguing the Middle East, while expressing hope and optimism for the future of his country's relations with India. Notable leaders who attended his conference included Narendra Modi, Sushma Swaraj, former Afghan president Hamid Karzai, Indian Minister of State M J Akbar and Indian National Congress leader Shashi Tharoor. Netanyahu's son Yair Netanyahu was supposed to accompany the Israeli premier on an Indian state visit, but only a week prior to the visit a scandalous recording about Yair's private visit to a strip club with his friends was disclosed on Israel Television News' main broadcast.

=== Narendra Modi's visit to Israel (2026) ===
Prime Minister Narendra Modi arrived in Israel on February 25, 2026, for a two-day state visit. He was invited by Israeli Prime Minister Benjamin Netanyahu. This is the second time an Indian prime minister has visited Israel and includes a scheduled address to the Knesset, the first ever by an Indian leader. Upon landing in Israel, Modi was received by Netanyahu and his wife, with an official ceremony featuring the national anthems of both countries.

The diplomatic agenda focuses on a proposed "Hexagon of Alliances," a strategic framework introduced by Netanyahu to coordinate security and economic efforts among Israel, India, Greece, Cyprus, and other regional partners against what he described as "radical axes". In relation to defense, the two countries are reviewing their strategic partnership with an emphasis on advanced technology transfers. These discussions reportedly include the integration of Israeli-developed systems, such as the Iron Beam laser-based air defense platform and Iron Dome components, into India's long-term security infrastructure.

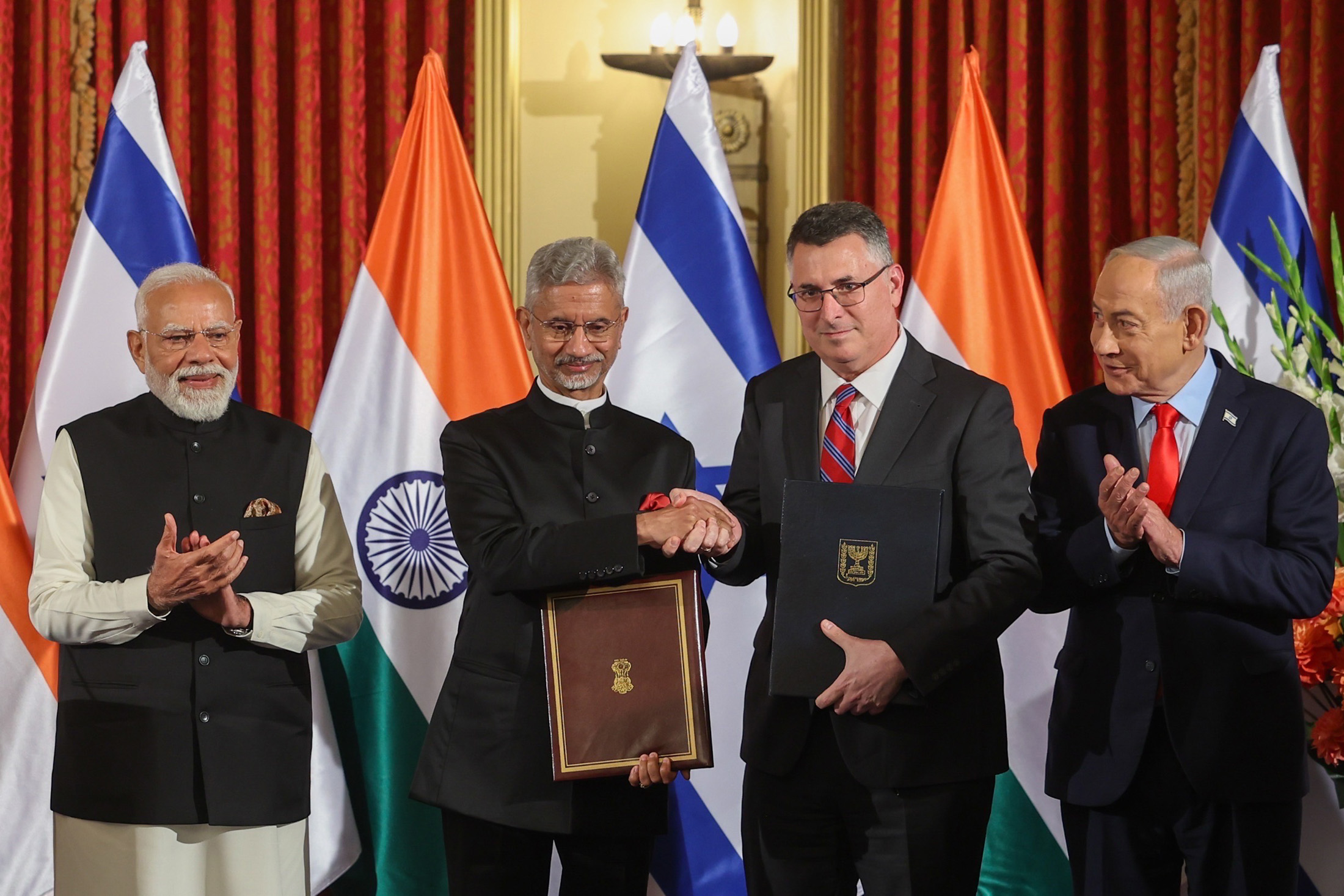
Exchange of MoUs between India and Israel, in Israel on February 26, 2026.

In addition to military cooperation, the visit addresses economic and civilian ties, including negotiations for a Free Trade Agreement (FTA) and a potential mobility pact for Indian workers in Israel. Modi is also scheduled to meet with President Isaac Herzog and visit the Yad Vashem Holocaust Remembrance Center before holding delegation-level talks to discuss innovation, agriculture, and water management.

== Military and strategic ties ==
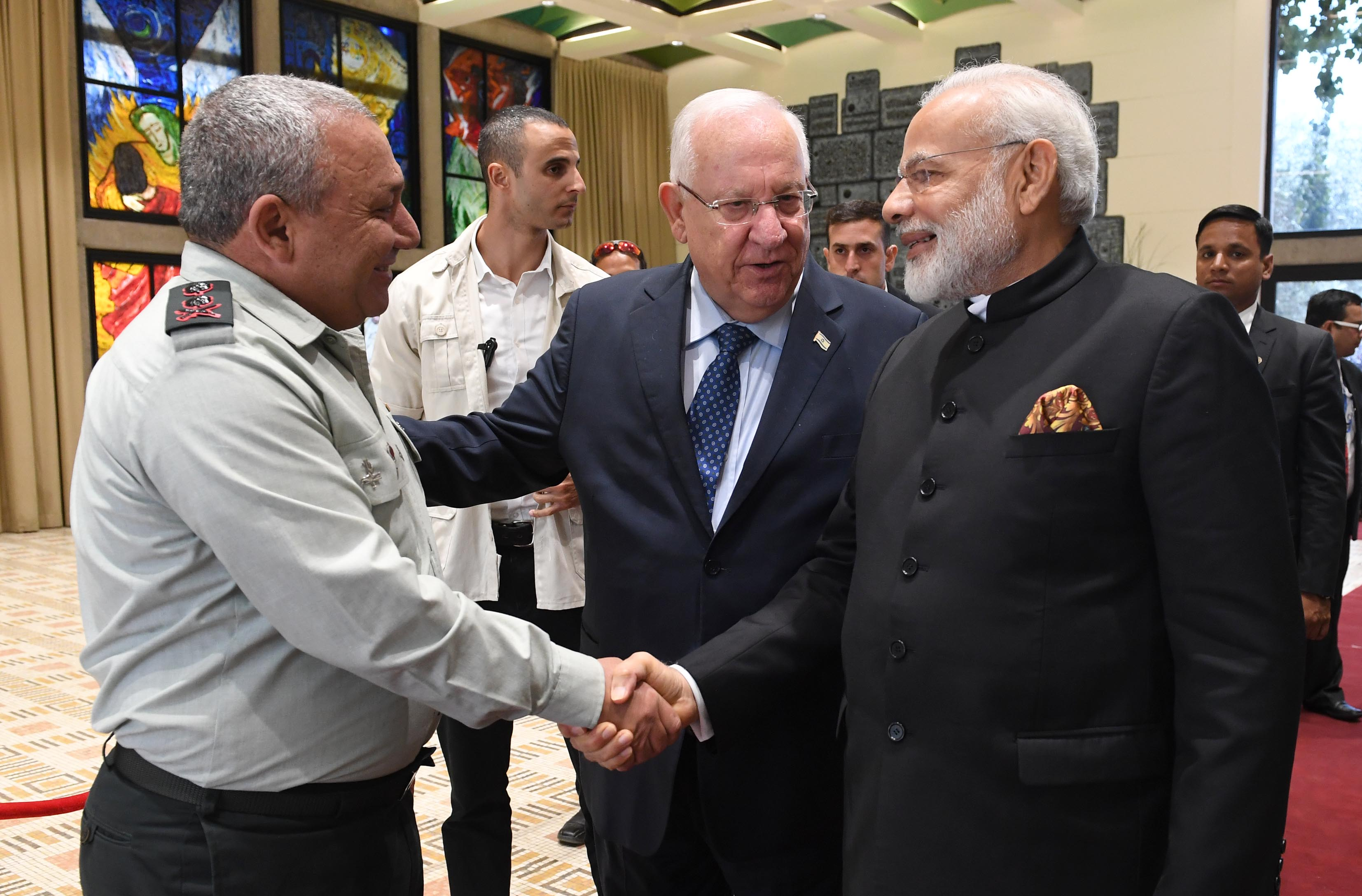
10th President of Israel (middle) and Chief of General Staff of the Israel Defense Forces Gadi Eizenkot with Prime minister Narendra Modi

New Delhi found in the defense industry of Israel a useful source of weapons, one that could supply it with advanced military technology. Thus was established the basis of a burgeoning arms trade, which reached almost $600 million in 2016, making Israel the second-largest source of defense equipment for India, after Russia. India and Israel have increased co-operation in military and intelligence ventures since the establishment of diplomatic relations. The rise of Islamic extremist terrorism in both nations has generated a strong strategic alliance between the two. In 2008, India launched a military satellite TecSAR for Israel through its Indian Space Research Organisation.

- In 1996, India purchased 32 IAI Searcher unmanned aerial vehicles (UAVs), Electronic Support Measure sensors and an Air Combat Manoeuvering Instrumentation simulator system from Israel. Since then Israel Aerospace Industries (IAI) has serviced several large contracts with the Indian Air Force including the upgrading of the IAF's Russian-made MiG-21 ground attack aircraft and there have been further sales of unmanned aerial vehicles as well as laser-guided bombs.
- In 1997, Israel's president Ezer Weizman became the first head of the Jewish state to visit India. He met with Indian president Shankar Dayal Sharma, Vice President K R Narayanan and Prime Minister H D Deve Gowda. Weizman negotiated the first weapons deal between the two nations, involving the purchase of Barak-1 vertically launched surface-to-air (SAM) missiles from Israel. The Barak-1 has the ability to intercept anti-ship missiles such as the Harpoon. The purchase of the Barak-1 missiles from Israel by India was a tactical necessity since Pakistan had purchased Lockheed P-3 Orion maritime surveillance aircraft and 27 Harpoon sea-skimming anti-ship missiles from the United States. Israel was one of the selected few nations, a group that also included France and Russia, that did not condemn India's 1998 Pokhran-II nuclear tests.
- In 1999, Israel supported India in the Kargil war by providing arms and ammunition.
- In 2000, Israeli submarines reportedly conducted test launches of cruise missiles capable of carrying nuclear warheads in the waters of the Indian Ocean, off the Sri Lankan coast. In naval terms, Israel sees great strategic value in an alliance with the Indian Navy, given India's naval dominance of South Asian waters and Indian Ocean at large. Due to the great importance of maritime trade to the Israeli economy it thus sees the potential of establishing a logistical infrastructure in the Indian Ocean with the help of the Indian Navy.
- India purchased three Phalcon AWACS, fitted with IAI radar equipment mounted on Russian IL-76 transport aircraft, in 2003 at cost of $1 billion.
- India purchased 50 Israeli drones for $220 million in 2005. India was considering buying the newer Harop drone. India is also in the process of obtaining missile-firing Hermes 900.
- Israel Aerospace Industries Ltd signed a US$2.5 billion deal with India in 2007 to develop an anti-aircraft system and missiles for the country, in the biggest defence contract in the history of Israel at the time. IAI CEO Yitzhak Nissan visited India to finalise the agreement with heads of the defence establishment and the country's president. IAI is developing the Barak 8 missile for the Indian Navy and Indian Air Force which is capable of protecting sea vessels and ground facilities from aircraft and cruise missiles. The missile has a range of over 70 kilometres. The missile will replace the current obsolete Russian system used by India.
- On 10 November 2008, Indian military officials visited Israel to discuss joint weapons development projects, additional sales of Israeli equipment to the Indian military, and anti-terrorism strategies. The new round of talks was seen as a significant expansion in the Indian-Israeli strategic partnership.
- Following the 2008 Mumbai attacks, Israel offered a team of about 40 special-operations forces and assistance in investigations. Tzipi Livni said: "If they need us we will help where needed". Magen David Adom dispatched a team of paramedics, medics and other professionals to assist with rescue efforts in the wake of the attacks. Israeli newspapers reported that the Manmohan Singh government turned down an offer by Defense Minister Ehud Barak to send counter-terrorist units to help fight the attackers.
- In December 2009, Lt Gen Gabi Ashkenazi, Chief of Staff of the Israel Defense Forces, made a visit to India to cement the defence ties between the two countries. He pledged every help to India in fighting terrorism.
- In March 2011, it was reported that India would buy 8356 Israeli Spike anti-tank missiles, 321 launchers, 15 training simulators and peripheral equipment, for $1 billion, from Israel's Rafael Advanced Defense Systems. The deal was finalised by Prime Minister Narendra Modi after coming into office.

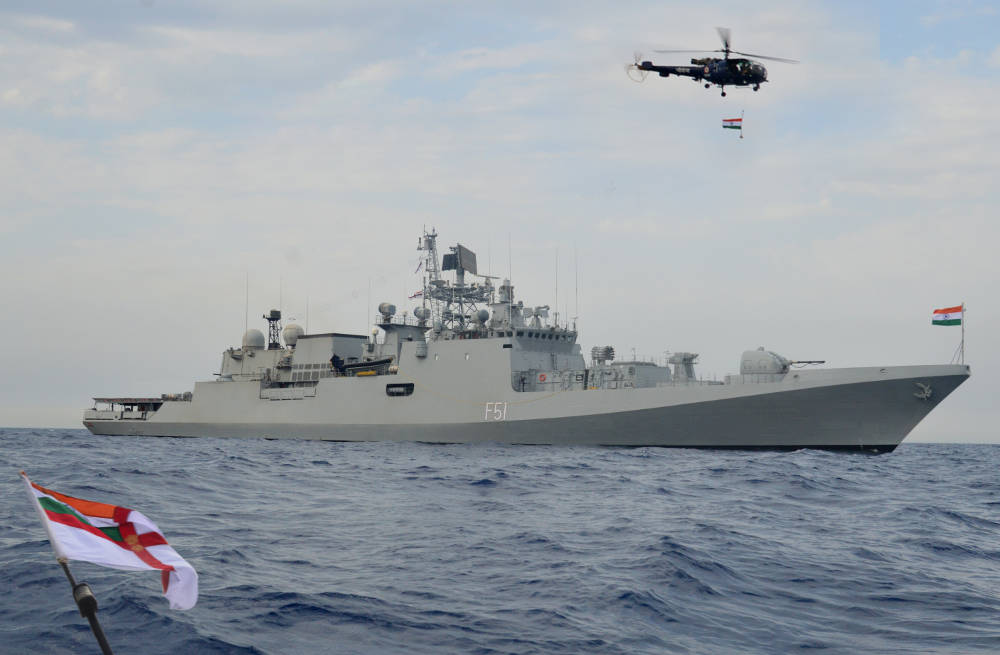
INS Trikand entering the port of Haifa, Israel, 19 August 2015

- In September 2015, the Indian government approved the air force's request to purchase 10 Heron TP drones from Israel Aerospace Industries (IAI). In 2015, a delegation from Israel's Jerusalem Center for Public Affairs visited India, led by former Israeli ambassador to the United Nations Dore Gold. Shared strategic interests were discussed, including combatting radical Islam, the handling of territorial disputes, and the security situation in West Asia/the Middle East and South Asia.

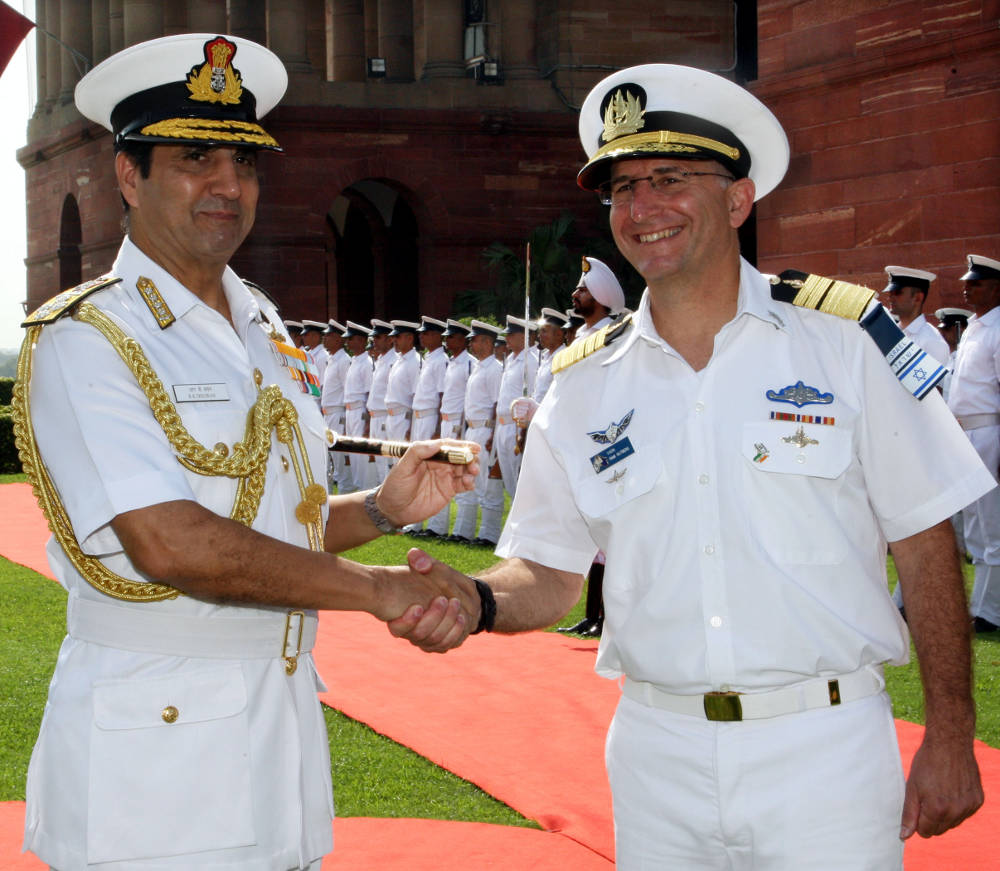
Indian Adm. Robin Dhowan greets VAdm. Ram Rothberg, Commander-in-Chief of the Israeli Navy at South Block, New Delhi, 24 August 2015

- In October 2015, The Pioneer reported that India and Israel were planning to hold their first joint military exercise. The date and location were not announced.
- In September 2016, the Indian government approved the purchase of two more Phalcon AWACS.
- In 2017, the countries signed a military agreement worth US$2 billion.
- In 2017, India participated in the Blue Flag exercise in Uvda Air Force Base in southern Israel for the first time, where it deployed its elite and Garud Commando Force and a Hercules C-130J plane from its "Veiled Vipers" Squadron. Indian and Israeli special forces conducted a range of tactical joint exercises, which included protection of strategic assets, ground infiltration and evacuation.
- The Indian Air Force sent five Dassault Mirage 2000 fighter aircraft to participate in Blue Flag 2021.
- The Defence Research and Development Organisation (DRDO) and the Directorate of Defence Research and Development (DDR&D) signed a Bilateral Innovation Agreement on 9 November 2021. The agreement facilitates the joint production of defence technology such as drones, robotics, artificial intelligence, quantum technology and other areas. Production will be jointly funded by both agencies and all technologies developed under the agreement will be available for use by both India and Israel.

=== Intelligence-sharing cooperation ===
When the Research and Analysis Wing (RAW) was founded in September 1968 by R.N. Kao, he was advised by then Prime Minister Indira Gandhi to cultivate links with Mossad. This was suggested as a countermeasure to military links between that of Pakistan and China, as well as with North Korea. Israel was also concerned that Pakistani army officers were training Libyans and Iranians in handling Chinese and North Korean military equipments.

Pakistan believed intelligence relations between India and Israel threatened Pakistani security. When young Israeli tourists began visiting the Kashmir valley in the early 1990s, Pakistan suspected they were disguised Israeli army officers there to help Indian security forces with anti-terrorism operations. Israeli tourists were attacked, with one slain and another kidnapped. Pressure from the Kashmiri Muslim diaspora in the United States led to the kidnapped tourist's eventual release. Kashmiri Muslims feared that the attacks could isolate the American Jewish community, and result in them lobbying the US government against Kashmiri separatist groups.

A Rediff story in 2003 revealed clandestine links between R&AW and Mossad. In 1996, R.K. Yadav, a former RAW official had filed a disproportionate assets case in the Delhi High Court against Anand Kumar Verma, RAW chief between 1987 and 1990. Yadav listed eight properties that he claimed were purchased illegally by Verma using RAW's unaudited funds for secret operations. Although his petition for a CBI inquiry into Verma's properties was dismissed, Yadav managed to obtain more information through a right to information request in 2005 and filed another case in 2009. In 2013, the CBI carried out an investigation of Verma's properties. Proceedings in the Delhi High Court revealed the names of two companies operated by RAW in 1988 – Piyush Investments and Hector Leasing and Finance Company Ltd. The firms were headed by two senior RAW officials V. Balachandran and B. Raman. Balachandran and Raman retired in 1994 and 1995 respectively. The companies were listed as trading houses that dealt in several kinds of minerals, automobiles, textiles, metals and spare parts, and also claimed to produce feature films. The companies purchased two flats in Gauri Sadan, a residential building on Hailey Road, New Delhi in March 1989 for ₹ 23 lakh.

India Today reported that the two flats were RAW safe houses used as operational fronts for Mossad agents and housed Mossad's station chief between 1989 and 1992. RAW had reportedly decided to have closer ties to Mossad, and the subsequent secret operation was approved by then Prime Minister Rajiv Gandhi. India Today cites "RAW insiders" as saying that RAW agents hid a Mossad agent holding an Argentine passport and exchanged intelligence and expertise in operations, including negotiations for the release of an Israeli tourist by the Jammu and Kashmir Liberation Front militants in June 1991. When asked about the case Verma refused to speak about the companies, but claimed his relationship with them was purely professional. Raman stated, "Sometimes, spy agencies float companies for operational reasons. All I can say is that everything was done with government approval. Files were cleared by the then prime minister [Rajiv Gandhi] and his cabinet secretary. Balachandran stated, "It is true that we did a large number of operations but at every stage, we kept the Cabinet Secretariat and the prime minister in the loop."

In November 2015, The Times of India reported that agents from Mossad and MI5 were protecting Prime Minister Narendra Modi during his visit to Turkey. Modi was on a state visit to the United Kingdom and was scheduled to attend the 2015 G-20 Summit in Antalya, Turkey. The paper reported that the agents had been called in to provide additional cover to Modi's security detail, composed of India's Special Protection Group and secret agents from RAW and IB, in wake of the November 2015 Paris attacks.

On 14 February 2019, a convoy of vehicles carrying security personnel on the Jammu-Srinagar National Highway was attacked by a vehicle-borne suicide bomber at Lethpora in the Pulwama district, Jammu and Kashmir, India. 40 Central Reserve Police Force personals were killed by the bomber. Israel responded to India, offering unconditional support to the Indian Army and the Government. Israel has informed that they will share intelligence and technology to help India respond.

Following the Pahalgam attack on 22 April 2025, Israeli Prime Minister Benjamin Netanyahu condemned the incident as "barbaric" and affirmed that Israel stands with India in its fight against terrorism, with similar messages of solidarity echoed by Israel's Foreign Minister. After India's Operation Sindoor on 7 May, Israel's Ambassador to India, Reuven Azar, reiterated support for India's right to self-defense, stating that terrorists must know there is no safe haven for those committing heinous crimes against the innocent.

== Bilateral trade ==
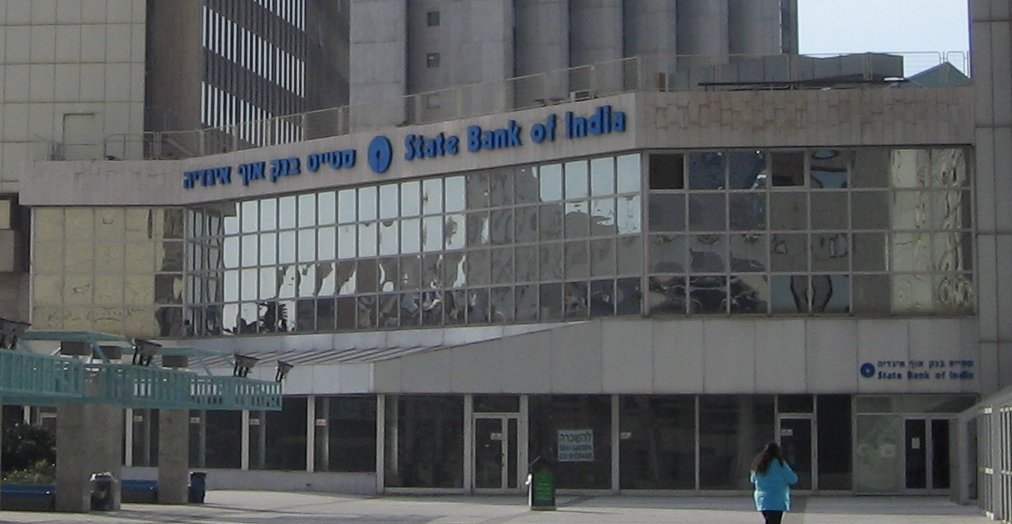
The Israeli headquarters of the State Bank of India, located in Ramat Gan, Tel Aviv District

Bilateral trade between India and Israel grew from $200 million in 1992 to $4.52 billion in 2014, of which Israel's imports from India accounted for $2.3 billion, or 3.2% of its overall imports. As of 2014, India is Israel's tenth-largest trade partner and import source, and seventh-largest export destination. India's major exports to Israel include precious stones and metals, organic chemicals, electronic equipment, plastics, vehicles, machinery, engines, pumps, clothing and textiles, and medical and technical equipment. The two countries have also signed a 'Double Taxation Avoidance Agreement'.

In 2007, Israel proposed starting negotiations on a free trade agreement with India, and in 2010, then Indian prime minister Manmohan Singh accepted that proposal. The agreement is set to focus on many key economic sectors, including information technology, biotechnology, water management, pharmaceuticals, and agriculture. In 2013, then Israeli Minister of Economy Naftali Bennett projected a doubling of trade from $5 to $10 billion between the two countries, if a free trade agreement was successfully negotiated. As of 2015, negotiations on a free trade agreement continue, with both countries considering negotiating a more narrow free trade agreement on goods, followed by separate agreements on trade in investment and services.

Following the coronavirus pandemic, on 9 April 2020, India exported to Israel a five-ton shipment of drugs and chemicals. The consignment included ingredients for the drugs hydroxychloroquine and chloroquine. On this occasion, Sanjeev Singla, India's then ambassador to Israel, stressed the bilateral ties between both the countries. It was in March 2020, that Prime Minister Benjamin Netanyahu asked Modi to exempt Israel from the export ban on raw materials used to make medicines which would help in treating the patients affected with coronavirus. Israel will be sending life-saving equipment including oxygen generators and respirators to India throughout the week to assist it in the fight against coronavirus.

The 10 major commodities exported from India to Israel were:

1. Gems, precious metals and coins: $973.6 million
2. Organic chemicals: $296.5 million
3. Electronic equipment: $121.2 million
4. Medical, technical equipment: $59.3 million
5. Plastics: $56.4 million
6. Vehicles: $44.4 million
7. Machinery: $38.1 million
8. Other textiles, worn clothing: $31.8 million
9. Knit or crochet clothing: $31.6 million
10. Clothing (not knit or crochet): $30.8 million

Israeli exports to India amounted to $2.3 billion or 3.8% of its overall exports in 2015. The 10 major commodities exported from Israel to India were:

1. Gems, precious metals and coins: $933.7 million
2. Electronic equipment: $389.3 million
3. Medical, technical equipment: $180.7 million
4. Iron or steel products: $170.3 million
5. Fertilisers: $157 million
6. Machinery: $110.9 million
7. Organic chemicals: $69.8 million
8. Other chemical goods: $44.2 million
9. Inorganic chemicals: $43.6 million
10. Plastics: $29.5 million

== Science and technology collaboration ==
In 1993, during the visit to India of then Israeli Foreign Minister Shimon Peres, India and Israel signed an agreement on science and technology, which allowed for direct scientific cooperation between both governments. Specific areas of cooperation included information technology, biotechnology, lasers, and electro-optics. Additionally, a joint committee to monitor collaboration between the two nations was established and set to meet biennially. In 1994, a $3 million joint science and technology fund was set up to facilitate R&D collaboration between both countries.

In 1996, Indian scientists attended a seminar on advanced materials in Israel. In 1997, Israeli scientists attended a seminar on biotechnology in Delhi. In 1998, India and Israel had 22 ongoing joint research projects. A joint symposium on the human genome was held in Jerusalem, where six Indian scientists took part. In November 1999, India and Israel agreed on four proposals for joint research projects in the field of human genome research. In 2000, even more joint projects related to human genome research were agreed on, and a status seminar on this field was held in India. In early 1999, more than 20 Israeli scientists participated in a physics symposium on condensed matter in Delhi. In 2001, a similar symposium was held in Jerusalem, with 18 Indian scientists attending.

In 2003, both countries discussed doubling their investment in their ongoing science and technology collaboration to $1 million each, starting in October 2004. In 2005, India and Israel signed a memorandum of understanding to set up a fund to encourage bilateral investment into industrial research and development and specific projects. Under the agreement, at least one Indian and one Israeli company must be collaborating on a project for that project to qualify for the fund. From 2006 to 2014, the fund, named i4RD, has been used in seven projects. In 2012, the two countries signed a five-year $50 million academic research agreement for promoting collaborative research across a wide range of disciplines, including medical and information technology, social and life sciences, humanities, and the arts.

In 2012, Israel stated its intent to increase technological and economic cooperation with the Indian state of Bihar, in the fields of agriculture, water management, solar energy, and medical insurance. In 2014, Israel made plans to open two agricultural centers of excellence in Bihar, focusing on increasing productivity of vegetable and mango crops.

Israel has offered to help the India government with a project to clean the Ganga. An Israeli delegation visited India in August 2015 and met with officials of the Union Ministry of Water Resources, River Development and Ganga Rejuvenation. Israeli ambassador to India Daniel Carmon also called on Union Urban Development and Parliamentary Affairs Minister M. Venkaiah Naidu to offer Israel's expertise in water management to battle water scarcity. Ohad Horsandi, spokesperson of the Israeli Embassy in New Delhi stated that Israel was keen to help in India meet its water needs for agriculture and drinking, and was pushing for more government-to-government agreements.

Following Prime Minister Modi's visit to Israel in 2017, there has been an increased call for collaboration between Israel and India on innovation development. The non-profit Indian based global trade body NASSCOM, along with the professional service company Accenture, released the report Collaborative Innovation: The Vehicle Driving Indo-Israel Prosperity, to highlight areas of scientific and technological collaboration between the two countries. Additionally, the non-profit organization TAVtech Ventures is launching a program that connect students from Israel and the United States with local Indian students to come up with tech-based startups.

=== Space collaboration ===
In 2002, India and Israel signed a cooperative agreement promoting space collaboration between both nations.

In 2003, the Israel Space Agency, or ISA, expressed interest in collaborating with the Indian Space Research Organisation, or ISRO, in using satellites for improved management of land and other resources. Israel also expressed interest in participating in ISRO's proposed mission of sending an unmanned craft to the moon. Additionally, the two countries signed an agreement outlining the deployment of TAUVEX, an Israeli space telescope array, on India's GSAT-4, a planned navigation and communication satellite. In 2010, the TAUVEX array was removed from GSAT-4 by the ISRO, and the array was never subsequently launched. The GSAT-4 itself failed to launch, due to the failure of its cryogenic engine.

In 2005, Israel decided to launch TecSAR, its first synthetic aperture radar imaging satellite, on India's Polar Satellite Launch Vehicle, or PSLV. TecSAR was chosen to launch through India's PSLV due to Israeli concerns about the reliability and technical limitations of its own Shavit space launch vehicle, economic considerations, and also due to Israel's desire to increase strategic cooperation with India. In 2008, TecSAR was successfully inserted into orbit by India's PSLV. One of TecSAR's primary functions is to monitor Iran's military activities.

In 2009, India successfully launched RISAT-2, a synthetic aperture radar imaging satellite. RISAT-2 was manufactured by Israel Aerospace Industries, or IAI, in conjunction with ISRO. The launch of the RISAT-2 satellite aimed to provide India with greater earth observation power, which would improve disaster management, and increase surveillance and defense capabilities. The acquisition and subsequent launch of the RISAT-2 satellite was accelerated after the 2008 Mumbai attacks, to boost India's future surveillance capabilities.

=== Agriculture collaboration ===
India has chosen Israel as a strategic partner (G2G) in the field of agriculture.This partnership evolved into the Indo-Israel Agricultural Project (IIAP), under the Indo Israel Action Plan, based on a MOU signed by Indian and Israeli ministers of Agriculture in 2006. The partnership aim to introduce crop diversity, increasing productivity & increasing water use efficiency. IIAP has been initiated in 2009 after signing a bilateral agreement between Indian and Israeli ministers of Agriculture (2006). IIAP is implemented via establishment of Centers of Excellence (CoE), in which Israeli Technologies and know-how are disseminated tailored to local Indian conditions. Till date three phases of IIAP has been channeled. Each IIAP phase lasts for three years (2009–2012; 2012–2015, 2015–2018).Within the 16 States that has been invited to take part in the IIAP, 22 CoE's are currently into the fully active stage.

Acknowledging the success of MIDH MASHAV IIAP Program as implemented during the last decade a three-year work program in Agriculture" 2018–2020 was signed between the Ministry of Agriculture and Farmer's Welfare of the Republic of India and Mashav- Ministry of Foreign Affairs Israel to increase the value chain demonstrated with the fully operative Indo-Israel Center of Excellence by introducing new components including the Indo-Israeli Centre of Excellence for Animal Husbandary & Dairying, Hisar. Center of Excellence (CoE) is a platform for knowledge transfer and Israeli Agro-Technology. As a goal the CoE aims to serve the farmer with a focus on a key crop. Each CoE is composed of Nursery management, Cultivation techniques, and Irrigation and fertigation.

Also in 2008, Israel and India finalised an agricultural plan introducing crops native to the Middle East and Mediterranean to India, with a particular focus on olives. Subsequently, around 112,000 olive trees were planted in the desert of Rajasthan. In 2014, more than 100 tonnes of olives were produced in Rajasthan.

=== Workforce collaboration ===
Israel is conducting a recruitment drive in India to address its growing demand for skilled construction workers. This initiative, facilitated by a government-to-government agreement, is focused on recruiting up to 10,000 Indian workers. The recruitment process is taking place at various locations across India, including the Industrial Training Institute in Aundh, Pune.

The Indian government is supporting this effort by providing infrastructure and logistical assistance. This recruitment drive offers Indian workers the opportunity for international employment. To date, thousands of Indian workers have already been deployed to Israel.

== Oil and natural gas sector cooperation ==
With the recent discovery of the Tamar and Levianthan gas fields off the coast of Israel, India has been one of the first countries to bid for an exploration license in order to extract and import natural gas from the fields. India's ONGC Videsh, Bharat PetroResources, Indian Oil and Oil India were awarded an exploration license by the Israeli government, a clear sign of the ongoing diversification in ties between the two countries.

== Cultural ties and cross-country perceptions ==
In 2011, cultural artists and performers from India arrived in Israel to participate in a three-week festival commemorating 20 years of diplomatic relations between the two countries. According to India's then ambassador to Israel Navtej Sarna, the purpose of the festival was to improve the bilateral relationship between the two countries by facilitating a greater understanding of each other's culture.

According to a 2009 international study commissioned by the Israeli Foreign Ministry, the greatest level of sympathy towards Israel can be found in India, with 58% of Indian respondents showing sympathy towards Israel.

As reported in 2015, opinion polls taken in India showed 70% and above of respondents had favorable views of Israel.

In 2015, the United Nations General Assembly voted unanimously in favour of adopting 21 June as International Yoga Day. In a clear sign of growing affinity between the two countries, the Indian Embassy in Tel Aviv organizes annual yoga day celebrations, where Israelis from all walks of life take part in various yogic exercises. Yoga has proven to be immensely popular in Israel and is a sign of Israel's cultural connection to India.

In 2019, Israel was a country partner at an event scheduled to be held in the central university Jamia Millia Islamia. Israel's involvement was protested against by students for their "occupation of Palestine." The university relented and announced that "it would not allow Israeli delegates to take part in events on the campus in future." Some Members of Parliament (MPs) had also lent support to the protesting students. The teachers association at Jamia had in 2014 protested against the Israeli offensive in Gaza and were joined by various activists, academicians, human rights defenders and members of civil society.

== Tourism ==
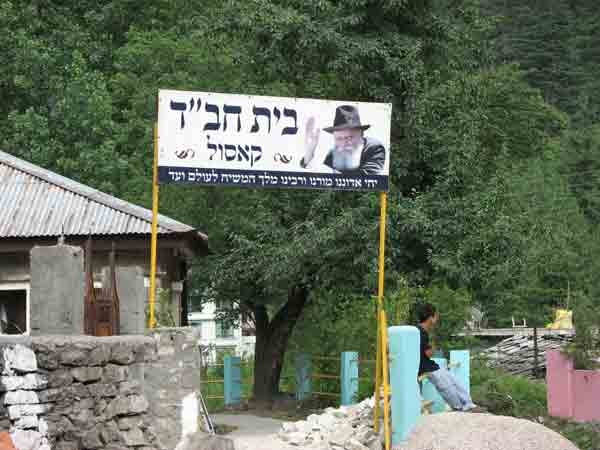
A Hebrew Chabad sign in Kasol, Himachal Pradesh, India

Around 40,000 Israelis, many of whom have just finished military service, visit India annually. There are dozens of Chabad-operated community centers in India, where many Israelis celebrate holidays and observe religious traditions. Popular destinations for Israelis include Goa, the Himalayas, Manali, Vashisht, Naggar, Kasol, and the villages surrounding Dharamsala. In many of these areas, Hebrew signs on businesses and public transportation are widely noticeable.

The number of tourists from India visiting Israel touched 15,900 in the year 2000. By 2010, the number of tourists had increased to 43,439. In 2014, the number of tourists from India visiting Israel was 34,900. A popular destination for Indian tourists traveling to Israel is Jerusalem. In part of 2010, Indian tourists were the biggest spenders in Israel, spending an average of $1,364 per tourist; the average tourist expenditure in Israel during this time was $1,091.

In 2011, representatives from both countries met in Delhi, and planned to enhance tourism through collaboration in the spheres of destination management and promotion, as well as in manpower development. Plans for tour-operators and travel agents in both countries to coordinate were also discussed. In 2015, 600 travel agents from India arrived in Israel for the annual Travel Agents Federation of India conference, and ways to decrease barriers to tourism were discussed. Currently, El Al flies between Tel Aviv and Mumbai, Air India flies between Delhi and Tel Aviv, and Arkia flies between Tel Aviv and Kochi as well as Tel Aviv and Goa.

In March 2018, Air India, operating flight number AI139, became the first airline to fly non-stop from New Delhi to Tel Aviv, via the airspace of Saudi Arabia, overturning an overfly ban on flights to Israel that had lasted 70 years. Currently, Air India is the only airline in the world that has been given such permission, and indicates a behind-the-scenes improvement in relations between Israel and the Arab world. The new flight takes approximately 7 hours to traverse the distance between India and Israel, which is 2 hours and 10 minutes shorter than the route taken by El Al from Mumbai to Tel Aviv. In recent days, the success of the route has prompted the airline to increase the frequency of flights to one each day.

In recent months, Israel has observed a constant rise in the number of Indian tourists to the country. Towards an additional effort to boost tourism from India, the Israeli government has simplified visa procedures for Indians who have already availed visas from either Canada, Australia, United States, Schengen countries or Israel and have completed their travel to these countries. Visa processing fees for Indian applicants has also been reduced from the original 1700 to 1100. In the year 2017, Indian tourist arrivals to Israel rose by 31%, with over 60,000 tourists visiting the country that year. Israel plans to meet a target of over 100,000 Indian tourists for the year 2018.

From 1 January 2025, the Ministry of Tourism of Israel has launched a digital e-visa system for Indian travellers. This initiative aligns with Israel's broader strategy to enhance tourism ties with India, a rapidly growing market for international visitors.

== Interfaith relations ==
In February 2007, the first Jewish-Hindu interfaith leadership summit was held in New Delhi. The summit included the then Chief Rabbi of Israel Yona Metzger, the American Jewish Committee's International Director of Interreligious Affairs David Rosen, a delegation of chief rabbis from around the world, and Hindu leaders from India. During the summit, Rabbi Metzger stated that Jews have lived in India for over 2,000 years and have never been discriminated against. This is something unparalleled in human history.

In August 2007, amidst protests, a delegation of Indian Muslim leaders and journalists traveled to Israel. The visit was touted as a dialogue of democracies, and was organised by the American Jewish Committee's India office. During this trip, Maulana Jameel Ahmed Ilyasi, the then secretary-general of the All-India Association of Imams and Mosques, praised the mutual respect Israeli Arabs and Israeli Jews have for each other, and encouraged resolving problems by dialogue rather than violence. Muslim leaders met with then president Shimon Peres, where Peres highlighted the coexistence of religions in Jerusalem and India's struggle with terror and separatism.

In 2008, a second Hindu-Jewish summit took place in Jerusalem. Included in the summit was a meeting between Hindu groups and then Israeli president Shimon Peres, where the importance of a strong Israeli-Indian relationship was discussed. The Hindu delegation also met with Israeli politicians Isaac Herzog and Majalli Wahabi. Hindu groups visited and said their prayers at the Western Wall, and also paid their respects to Holocaust victims.

In 2009, a smaller Hindu-Jewish interfaith meeting organised by the Hindu American Foundation and the American Jewish Committee was held in New York City and Washington. Hindu and Jewish representatives gave presentations, and participants wore lapel pins combining the Israeli, Indian, and American flags.

In November 2012, Israeli president Shimon Peres remarked, "I think India is the greatest show of how so many differences in language, in sects can coexist facing great suffering and keeping full freedom."

In 2019, a large scale summit to further boost Hindu-Jewish cultural ties was organized by Indo-Israel Friendship Association in Mumbai. Many important leaders like Subramanian Swamy attended the event.

=== Judaism in India ===
Jewish immigrants arriving at Kochi in 68 AD

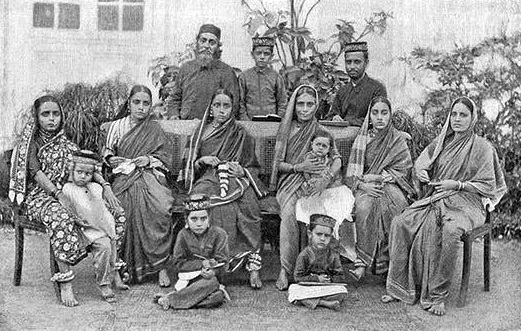
A Bene Israel family in Bombay (c. late 19th century)

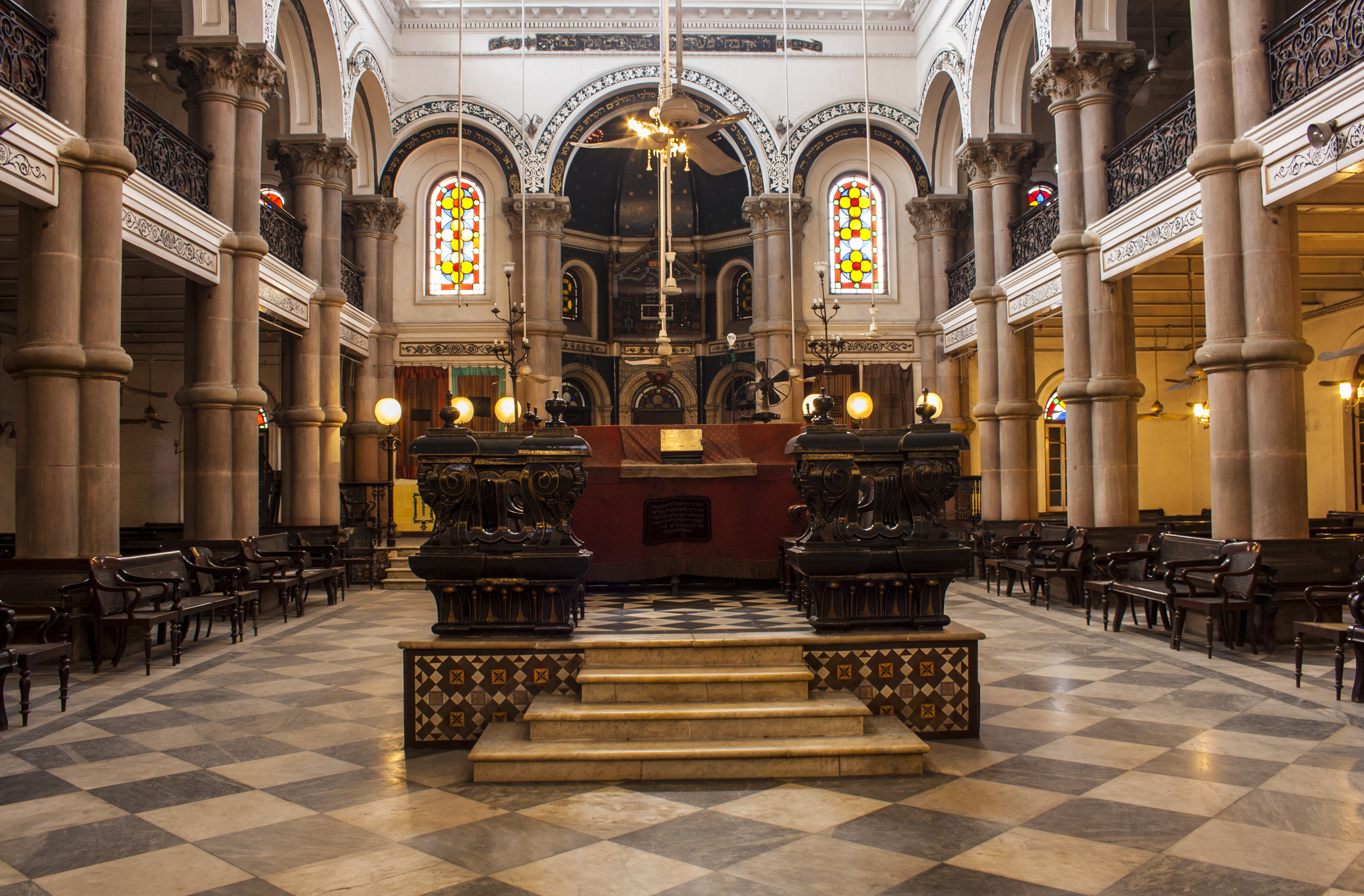
Interior of the Magen David Synagogue in Kolkata

The history of the Jewish people in India dates back to ancient times. Judaism was one of the first foreign religions to arrive in India in recorded history. Indian Jews are a religious minority of India, but unlike many parts of the world, have historically lived in India without any instances of antisemitism from the local majority populace, the Hindus. The better-established ancient communities have assimilated a large number of local traditions through cultural diffusion. The Jewish population in India is hard to estimate since each Jewish community is distinct with different origins; while some allegedly arrived during the time of the Kingdom of Judah, others are seen by some as descendants of Israel's Ten Lost Tribes. In addition to Jewish expatriates and recent immigrants, there are several distinct Jewish groups in India:

- Cochin Jews, also called Malabar Jews, are of Mizrahi and Sephardi heritage. They are the oldest group of Jews in India, with possible roots claimed to date to the time of King Solomon. The Cochin Jews settled in the Kingdom of Cochin in South India.
- The so-called Spanish and Portuguese Jews, Paradesi Jews and British Jews arrived at Madras during the 16th century, mainly as traders and diamond businessmen. They also have a large presence in the former Portuguese colony of Goa, where the Goan Inquisition was initiated in 1560.
- The Bene Israel arrived in the state of Maharashtra 900 years ago. Another branch of the Bene Israel community, resided in Karachi until the Partition of India in 1947, when they fled to India (in particular: Mumbai). Many of them also moved to Israel. The Jews from Sindh, Punjab or Pathan area are often incorrectly called Bani Israel Jews. The Jewish community who used to reside in other parts of what became Pakistan (such as Lahore or Peshawar) also fled to India in 1947, in a similar manner to the larger Karachi Jewish community.
- The Baghdadi Jews arrived in the city of Surat from Iraq (and other Arab states), Iran and Afghanistan about 250 years ago.
- The Bnei Menashe are Mizo and Kuki tribesmen in Manipur and Mizoram who are recent converts to Judaism.
- The Bene Ephraim (also called Telugu Jews) are a small group who speak Telugu; their observance of Judaism dates to 1981.

The majority of Indian Jews have made Aliyah (migrated) to Israel since the creation of the modern state in 1948. Over 70,000 Indian Jews now live in Israel (over 1% of Israel's total population). Of the remaining 5,000, the largest community is concentrated in Mumbai, where 3,500 have stayed over from the over 30,000 Jews registered there in the 1940s, divided into Bene Israel and Baghdadi Jews, though the Baghdadi Jews refused to recognize the B'nei Israel as Jews, and withheld dispensing charity to them for that reason. There are reminders of Jewish localities in Kerala still left such as synagogues.

In the beginning of the 21st century, new Jewish communities have been established in Mumbai, New Delhi, Bangalore, and other cities in India. The new communities have been established by the Chabad-Lubavitch movement which has sent rabbis to create those communities. The communities serve the religious and social needs of Jewish business people who have immigrated to or are visiting India, and Jewish backpackers touring India. The largest centre is the Nariman House in Mumbai. There are currently 33 synagogues in India, although many no longer function as such and today vary in their levels of preservation.

== See also ==
- Israelis in India
- Indians in Israel
- Indian Jews in Israel
- Embassy of Israel, New Delhi
- History of the Jews in India
- Baháʼí Faith in India
- Hinduism in Israel
- Foreign relations of India
- International recognition of Israel
- Foreign relations of Israel
- Battle of Haifa (1918)
