= Harold Fisch =

British-Israeli author, literary critic, translator, and diplomat

- אַהֲרֹן הַרְאֵל-פִישׁ
- Born: 25 March 1923; Birmingham, England
- Died: 8 November 2001 (aged 78); Jerusalem, Israel
- Spouse: Frances Joyce Roston (m. 1947)
- Children: Menachem Fisch; David Harel; Yossi Harel-Fisch
- Relatives: Murray Roston (brother-in-law)
- Awards: Israel Prize (2000)

Academic background
- Education: University of Sheffield; University of Oxford

Harold Fisch (25 March 1923 – 8 November 2001), also known as Aharon Harel-Fisch (Hebrew: אַהֲרֹן הַרְאֵל-פִישׁ), was a British-Israeli author, literary critic, translator, and diplomat. He was a Professor of English and Comparative literature at Bar-Ilan University, of which he served as Rector from 1968 to 1971. He was awarded the Israel Prize for Literature in 2000.

== Biography ==
Harold (Aharon) Fisch was born in Birmingham to Rebecca (née Swift) and Rabbi Dr. Solomon Fisch. His mother was the sister of Rabbi Morris Swift, who was a dayan of the London Beth Din for nearly two decades. Fisch's father, born in Wolbrom, Poland, studied at Rabbi Solomon Breuer's yeshiva in Frankfurt before emigrating to England in 1920, where he received a doctorate from the University of Manchester. As a child, Fisch moved between Liverpool, Birmingham, Sheffield, and Leeds, where his father took up posts as a congregational rabbi.

Fisch began his undergraduate degree in English literature at the University of Sheffield in 1940, at the age of 17. His studies were interrupted by his service in the Royal Naval Volunteer Reserve from 1942 to 1945, as an officer on HMS Meynell and HMS Kildary. He completed his B.A. in 1946, and was appointed Lecturer in English at the University of Leeds the following year, meanwhile serving as chairman of the Inter-University Jewish Federation. In 1948, he received his BLitt from the University of Oxford, with a thesis on Calvinist bishop Joseph Hall.

== Academic career ==
In 1957, Fisch immigrated to Israel with his wife and four children, and accepted an associate professorship in English literature at the newly founded Bar-Ilan University. He was appointed full professor in 1964, and held the position of Rector from 1968 to 1971. Fisch founded the Kotler Institute for Judaism and Contemporary Thought in 1971, and the Lechter Institute for Literary Research in 1981, of which he served as chairman until his retirement from Bar-Ilan in 1987.

Fisch was responsible for the English translation of the Tanakh for the Koren Jerusalem Bible (1964), based on Michael Friedländer's Jewish Family Bible, which is still in publication and on its third edition.

== Zionist activism ==
Fisch participated in the establishment of the Neo-Zionist Movement for Greater Israel after the Six-Day War. His 1972 work A Zionist Revolution included a defense of Gush Emunim, based on the ideas of Menachem Kasher and Abraham Isaac Kook. During the era of Prime Minister Menachem Begin, Fisch was a member of the Israeli delegation to the 32nd General Assembly of the United Nations. He declined an offer from the Prime Minister to occupy the position of Ambassador of Israel to the Netherlands.

== Awards and recognition ==
Fisch was awarded the Israel Prize for Literature in 2000. He died on 8 November 2001 of a tumor discovered two weeks earlier.

== Published works ==
- The Dual Image: A Study of the Figure of the Jew in English Literature. London: Lincolns-Prager. 1959. OCLC 560698380.
- Jerusalem and Albion: The Hebraic Factor in Seventeenth-Century Literature. London: Routledge and Kegan Paul. 1964. OCLC 314544149.
- The Koren Jerusalem Bible. Jerusalem: Koren Publishers. 1967. OCLC 907788043.
- Hamlet and the Word: The Covenant Pattern in Shakespeare. New York: Ungar. 1971. OCLC 574587836.
- S.Y. Agnon. New York: Frederick Ungar. 1975. ISBN 9780804421973. OCLC 612045386.
- The Zionist Revolution: A New Perspective. Weidenfeld and Nicolson. 1978. OCLC 641497444.
- A Remembered Future: A Study in Literary Mythology. Bloomington: Indiana University Press. 1984. OCLC 1171238538.
- Poetry with a Purpose: Biblical Poetics and Interpretation. Bloomington: Indiana University Press. 1990. ISBN 9780253205643. OCLC 715575456.
- New Stories for Old: Biblical Patterns in the Novel. Basingstoke: Macmillan Press. 1998. ISBN 9780230502352.
- Biblical Presence in Shakespeare, Milton, and Blake: A Comparative Study. Oxford: Clarendon Press. 1999. ISBN 9780198184898. OCLC 781196210.
- Be-seter ʻelyon: paradoḳs u-setirah bi-meḳorot ha-Yahadut [Divine Contradictions: Judaism and the Language of Paradox] (in Hebrew). Ramat Gan: Bar-Ilan University Press. 2001. OCLC 609321147.
- Who Knows One?: An Essay in Autobiography. Ramat Gan: Bar-Ilan University Press. 2004. ISBN 9789652262752. OCLC 57344461.
