= List of ambassadors of Israel to India =

List of Israeli diplomats to India

Reuven Azar
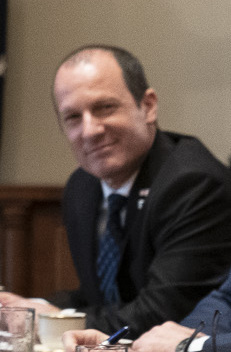

Israel Ambassador to India
- Incumbent
- Assumed office 2024
- President: Isaac Herzog
- Preceded by: Naor Gilon

The Israeli ambassadors are posted in New Delhi, India.

== List of ambassadors ==
- Reuven Azar 2024-
- Naor Gilon 2021 - 2024
- Ron Malka 2018 - 2021
- Daniel Carmon 2014 - 2018
- Alon Ushpiz 2011 - 2014
- Mark Sofer 2007 - 2011
- David Danieli 2003 - 2007
- David Aphek 2000 - 2003
- Yehoyada Haim 1995 - 2000
- Ephraim Dowek 1992 - 1995

=== Consulate (Bangalore) ===
- Consul General Jonathan Zadka 2020 -
- Consul General Dana Kursh 2017 - 2020
- Consul General Yael Hashavit 2015 - 2017
- Consul General Menhahem Kanafi 2012 - 2015

=== Consulate (Mumbai) ===
- Consul General Kobi Shoshani 2021-
- Consul General Yaakov Finkelstein 2017 - 2021
- Consul General David Akov 2014 - 2017
- Consul General Brett Jonathan Miller 2013 - 2014
- Consul General Orna Sagiv 2008 - 2013
- Consul General Daniel Zohar-Zonshine 2005 - 2008
- Consul General Dov Segev-Steinberg 1999 - 2003
- Consul General Walid Mansour 1996 - 1999
- Consul General Itzhak Gerberg 1992 - 1996
- Consul General Giora Becher 1989 - 1992
- Consul General Emanuel Seri 1981 - 1984
- Consul General Yair Atan 1971 - 1973
- Consul General Reuven Dafni 1965 - 1969
- Consul General Arieh Eilan 1962 - 1963
- Consul General Michael Michael (diplomat) 1959 - 1962
