= Embassy of Israel, New Delhi =

Diplomatic mission in India

שגרירות ישראל בניו דלהי Embassy of Israel, New Delhi
- Address: 3, Aurangzeb Road, Chanakyapuri, New Delhi 110011
- Opening: 1992
- Ambassador: Reuven Azar
- Jurisdiction: India; Bhutan
- Website: Official website

Embassy of Israel, New Delhi is the diplomatic mission of Israel to India. The embassy oversees the Consulate General of Israel, Mumbai and the Consulate General of Israel, Bangalore.

The embassy was opened after the official establishment of relations between India and Israel on January 29, 1992.

On February 13 2012 the wife of a diplomat from the embassy was wounded when a bomb exploded in her car while she was on her way to work, as part of 2012 attacks on Israeli diplomats.

A minor IED explosion took place outside the embassy on 29 January 2021 when the two countries celebrated the 29th anniversary of India-Israel ties. Israel blames Iran for this.

== Ambassadors ==
The first ambassador of Israel to serve in the Embassy was Ephraim Dowek.

The current ambassador (since 2021) is Naor Gilon.

== See also ==
- India–Israel relations
- List of diplomatic missions of Israel
- List of diplomatic missions in Israel
- List of diplomatic missions in India
- List of diplomatic missions of India
- Foreign relations: India | Israel
