= Gilon (surname) =

Gilon is a surname. Notable people with the surname include:

- Ilan Gilon (1956–2022), Israeli politician
- Naor Gilon (born 1964), Israeli ambassador
