= Ron Malka =

Israeli diplomat and economist

- רון מלכא
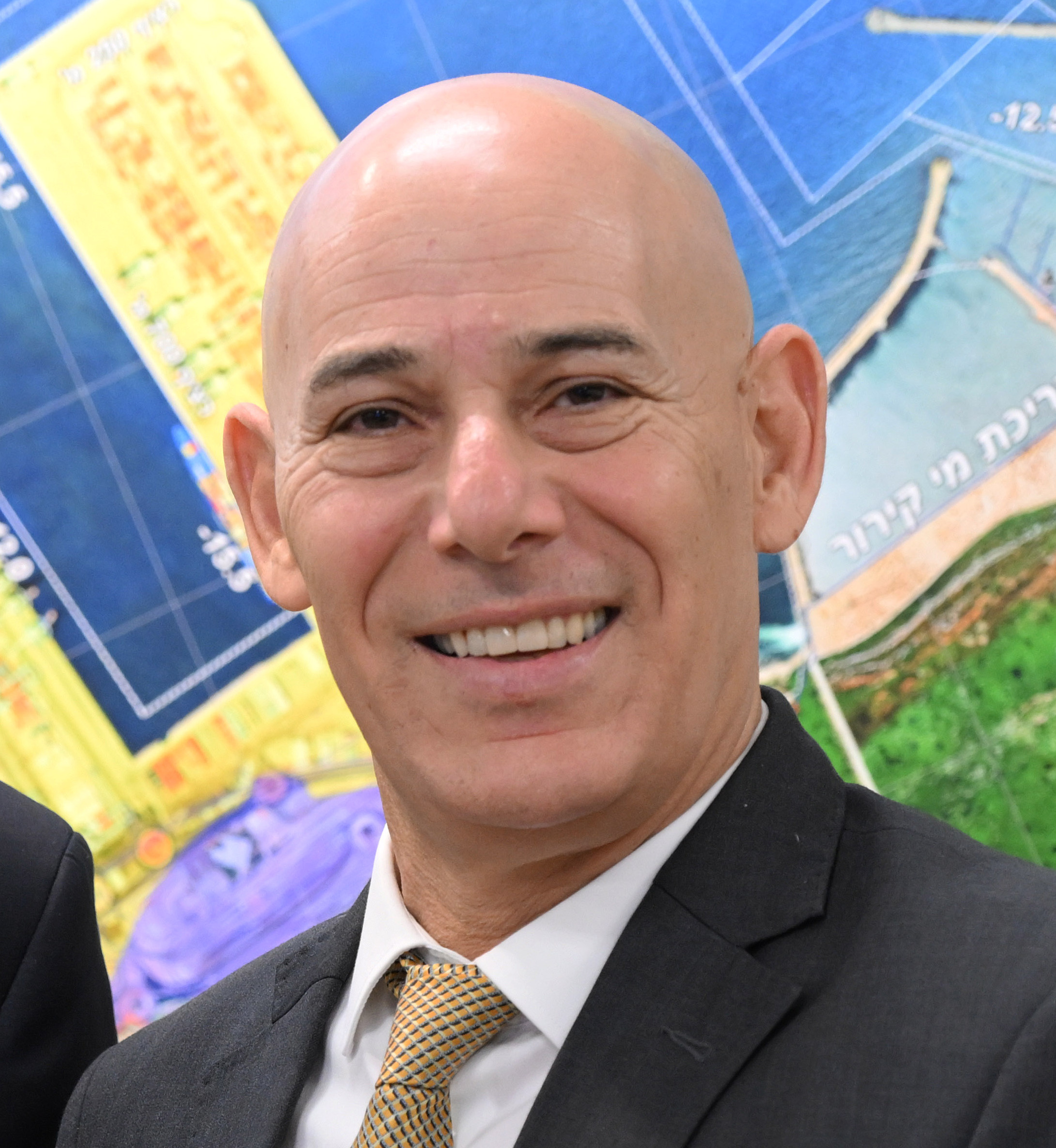
- Malka in 2024

Israeli Ambassador to India
- In office 2018–2021
- Preceded by: Daniel Carmon
- Succeeded by: Naor Gilon

Personal details
- Born: 1965 (age 60–61) Acre, Israel
- Education: Bar-Ilan University

Ron Malka (Hebrew: רון מלכא) is an Israeli diplomat and economist who served as the ambassador of Israel to India and non-resident ambassador to Sri Lanka and Bhutan, from 2018 to 2021.

== Early life ==
Born in 1965 in Acre to parents who immigrated from Morocco, Malka enlisted in the Israel Defense Forces in 1983 and served in the Intelligence Corps till 1992. He then served as financial advisor to the IDF Chief of Staff until 2007. He was discharged from the military with the rank of colonel.

== Financial and diplomatic career ==
In 1990, he graduated with a bachelor's degree in economics and business administration at Bar-Ilan University and in 1994, he completed a master's degree in business administration and a Ph.D. in economics in 2004 at the same university. He then served as an economics lecturer at Netanya Academic College and the Herzliya Interdisciplinary Center. In 2016, he was appointed Dean of the School of Banking and Capital Markets at the Academic Center for Law and Business in Tel Aviv.

From 2008 to 2014, he served as a director at the Tel Aviv Stock Exchange and during his tenure he also served as acting chairman of the stock exchange. He also served as a director of Automated Bank Services, Agor company for managing provident funds and training, and ROM Fund. In 2014, he served as a consultant to the Locker Committee, the Prime Minister's commission to review the defense budget.

In September 2018, Malka was appointed by Prime Minister of Israel Benjamin Netanyahu as Ambassador of Israel to India and Non-Resident Ambassador to Sri Lanka and Bhutan. On January 10, 2019, he presented his credentials to President of India Ram Nath Kovind. Malka served this position till 2021 and was succeeded by Naor Gilon. During his tenure, he signed an agreement establishing formal diplomatic relations between Israel and Bhutan on December 12, 2020, with the Bhutanese Ambassador to India Major General Vetsop Namgyel.

In June 2021, Israeli Minister of Economy Orna Barbivai announced her intention to appoint Malka as the Director General of the Ministry of Economy. On July 4, the government approved the appointment and Malka took office on August 1. He held this position till December 2022.

In February 2023, it was announced that Malka would join the board of directors of the port of Haifa in April 2023, and later become the port's chairman.

== Personal life ==
Malka is married and has three children.
