= Bhutan–Israel relations =

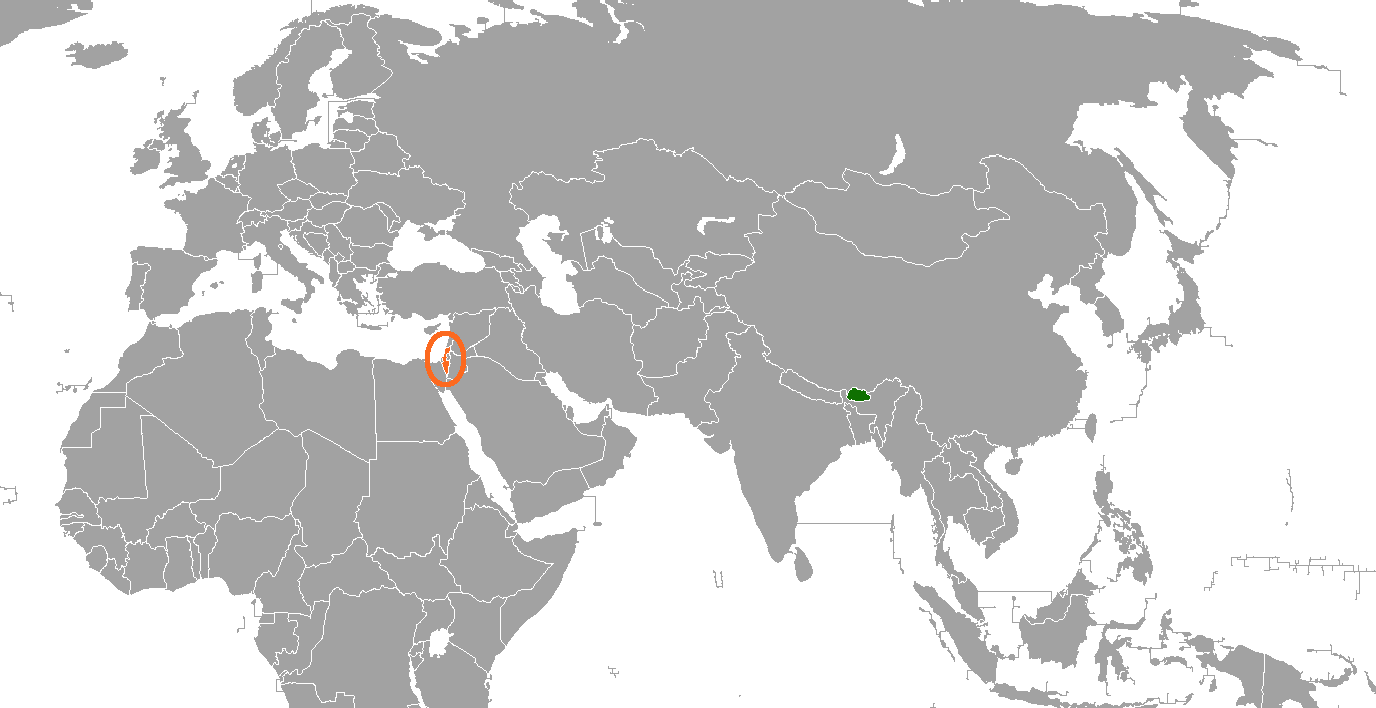
- Bhutan: Israel

Bhutan and Israel established formal relations in December 2020 with the signing of an agreement between the respective countries' ambassadors in India. Israel is the 54th country with which Bhutan has established ties. According to reports, the two countries have had a strong unofficial relationship since 1982, and have been in secret negotiations for several years before the formal announcement.

== See also ==
- Foreign relations of Bhutan
- Foreign relations of Israel
- Embassy of Israel, New Delhi
