= Israelis in India =

Israeli citizens and nationals or descendants in India

Total population
- 40,000 - 70,000

Regions with significant populations
- Goa · Maharashtra · Delhi · Uttar Pradesh · Telangana · Karnataka

Languages
- Hebrew · Marathi · Konkani · Telugu · Kannada · Hindi

Religion
- Judaism

Related ethnic groups
- Indian Jews

Israelis in India may be immigrants and expatriates from Israel, or Israelis residing in India - many of Indian Jewish descent. Many of them reside in Goa, Thane and Raigad districts of Maharashtra. Some have started businesses such as restaurants and boutiques. The most spoken languages among Jewish Indians and Israelis in India tend to be Marathi, Konkani and Hindi as well as their native language of Hebrew.

== Popular culture ==
- Flipping Out - An Israeli documentary film describing the drug use of Israeli men and women in India

== See also ==
- India–Israel relations
- Indians in Israel
- History of the Jews in India
