= Consulate General of Israel, Bengaluru =

Diplomatic mission in India

- Emblem of Israel
- Incumbent; Tammy Ben-Haim
- Ministry of Foreign Affairs (Israel)
- Style: Consulate General
- Formation: 20 May
- Website: Official website

The Consulate General of Israel in Bangalore represents the interests of the Government of Israel in the Indian states of Karnataka and surrounding states Tamil Nadu, Kerala, and Puducherry. It was opened on 20 May 2013 at Murphy Road, Halasuru, Bangalore. The consulate reports to the ambassador at the Embassy of Israel in New Delhi.

== Founding ==
In mid-2012 the Government of Israel was planning to open a consulate in Bangalore by the end of that year. They also announced their plans of starting three centres of excellence (CoE) in Karnataka related to horticulture. At that time they successfully built a close relationship with the horticulture department of the government of Karnataka.

The consulate was officially inaugurated on 20 May 2013, on the occasion of the 65th anniversary of the founding of Israel. This was the second Israeli consulate in India after Mumbai, other than their main Embassy in New Delhi. India also became the fifth country in the world where the Government of Israel had more than two diplomatic missions. During the inauguration event, Israeli ambassador Alon Ushpiz told:

Israel's presence in the technology capital of India comes naturally since Israel is also a hub for technology. We are also co-operating with the state in other fields like agriculture.

Menahem Kanafi became the Israeli Consul-General in Bangalore. He told in his speech:

Bangalore is a powerhouse of India. It is the Silicon Valley of the country. Israel is also like the Silicon Valley of the world. Each of us can profit from one another.

== Services and activities ==
From 1 July 2014 the consulate started issuing visas to Israel for the people of South Indian states Karnataka, Kerala, Tamil Nadu and Puducherry. They partnered with IVS Processing Services Ltd. for this service. At that time more than 40,000 Indians were travelling to Israel every year. Menahem Kanafi, Israel's Consul-General in Bangalore, told at that time:

The opening of the centre will intensify people-to-people contact through travel. We are fully committed to strengthening the relationship between Israel and India.

At the same time the consulate signed a Karnataka-Israel programme to nurture collaborative industrial Research and Development (R&D) ventures between Karnataka and Israeli companies by providing financial support. In July of that year, the consulate organized an Israeli film festival for the citizens of Bangalore. This event was jointly organized with the Suchitra Film Society and Bangalore Cultural Partners. Between 3 and 31 July, nine Israeli films were screened.

In 2014 the consulate also started providing scholarships to Indian students to study in Israeli educational institutions. In September 2014 John Joe Vattathara was the first student from Bangalore to be awarded a scholarship for a four-year electrical and electronics engineering course at Tel Aviv University (TAU).
