= List of ambassadors of Israel to the Netherlands =

The Ambassador from Israel to the Netherlands is the sovereign state of Israel's foremost diplomatic representative in the Netherlands.

== List of ambassadors ==
- Modi Moshe Ephraim, 2021–present
- Naor Gilon, 2019–2021
- Aviv Shir-On, 2016–2019
- Haim Divon, 2011–2016
- Harry Kney-Tal, 2006–2011
- Eitan Margalit, 2001–2005
- Yossi Gal, 1995–2001
- Michael Bavly, 1990–1995
- Zeev Suffot, 1985–1990
- Ya'akov Nehoshthan, 1982–1985
- Eytan Ronn, 1979–1982
- Shlomo Argov, 1977–1979
- Avraham Kidron, 1976–1977
- Hanan Bar-On, 1972–1975
- Shimshon Arad, 1968–1972
- Daniel Lewin 1966 - 1968
- David Shaltiel, 1963–1966
- Hanan Cidor, 1957–1963
- Minister Ezra Yoran, 1955–1957
- Minister Michael Amir, 1950–1954

== See also ==
- Israel–Netherlands relations
