= Alon Ushpiz =

Israeli diplomat and economist

- אלון אושפיז
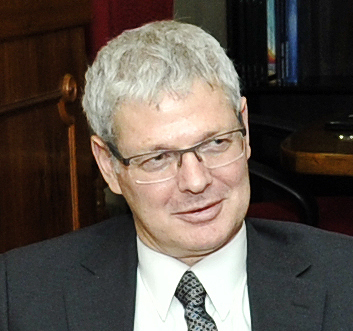
- Ushpiz in 2015

Director General, Foreign Ministry of Israel
- In office 30 June 2020 – 22 January 2023
- Preceded by: Yuval Rotem
- Succeeded by: Ronen Levy

Israeli Ambassador to India
- In office 2011–2014
- Preceded by: Mark Sofer
- Succeeded by: Daniel Carmon

Personal details
- Born: February 7, 1966 (age 60) Israel
- Education: Hebrew University of Jerusalem

Alon Ushpiz (Hebrew: אלון אושפיז) is an Israeli diplomat who served as the Director General of the Foreign Ministry of Israel, from 2020 to 2023. He previously served as the ambassador of Israel to India and non resident ambassador to Sri Lanka, from 2011 to 2014.

== Early life ==
Born in 1966, Ushpiz studied at Hebrew Reali School in Haifa. He served in the Israel Defense Forces and was discharged in 1987 at the rank of lieutenant.

== Diplomatic career ==
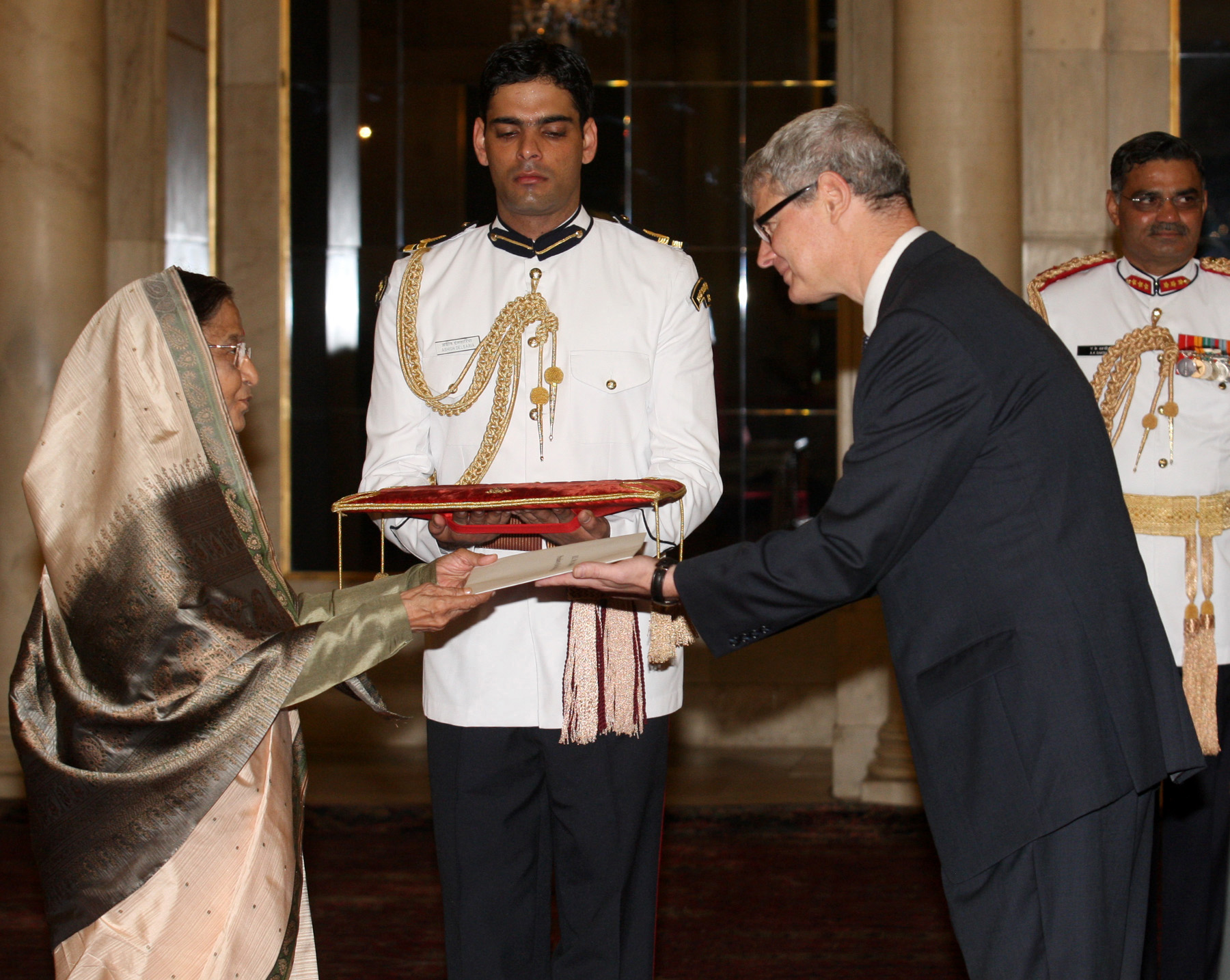
Ambassador-designate Ushpiz presenting his credential to President of India Pratibha Patil (12 August 2011)

In 1992, he graduated with a bachelor's degree in international relations and Japanese studies at the Hebrew University of Jerusalem, and joined the Foreign Ministry. After the completion of the cadet course, he was assigned to the Embassy of Israel in Tokyo, where he served as an intern and later as political secretary. During his time in Tokyo, he studied social sciences and communication at the University of Tokyo.

In 1999, he was appointed as the political advisor to Foreign Minister Shlomo Ben-Ami. In 2003, he was assigned to the Embassy of Israel in Washington, D.C., where he served as a minister for United States Congressional affairs. In 2007, he was appointed head of the coordination division at the Ministry of Foreign Affairs. In July 2011 he was appointed Israel's ambassador to India and non-resident ambassador to Sri Lanka. On 12 August 2011, he presented his credentials to the President of India Pratibha Patil. After serving in this position till 2014, he was appointed as head of the political and strategic division at the Ministry of Foreign Affairs in August of the same year.

In June 2020, the government of Israel approved Ushpiz's appointment as Director General of the Ministry of Foreign Affairs. He held this position till his resignation in January 2023 and was succeeded by Ronen Levy

== Personal life ==
Ushpiz and his wife Inbar have two children. He is fluent in Hebrew, English, German, Arabic and Japanese.
