= Daniel Carmon =

Israeli diplomat (born 1951)

- דניאל כרמון
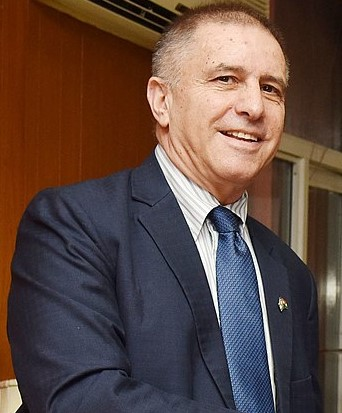
- Carmon in 2016

Israeli Ambassador to India
- In office 2014–2018
- Preceded by: Alon Ushpiz
- Succeeded by: Ron Malka

Personal details
- Born: 1951 (age 74–75) Tel Aviv, Israel
- Education: Hebrew University in Jerusalem
- Nickname: Dan

Daniel Carmon (Hebrew: דניאל כרמון) is an Israeli diplomat who served as the ambassador of Israel to India and non-resident ambassador to Sri Lanka and Bhutan, from 2014 to 2018.

== Biography ==
Carmon was born in Tel Aviv in 1951 and attended high schools in Jerusalem, Istanbul and Paris. From 1970 to 1973, he served as a paratrooper in the Israel Defense Forces, where he attained the rank of lieutenant. In 1973, he began his studies at the Hebrew University in Jerusalem, where he graduated with BA in International Relations.

== Diplomatic career ==
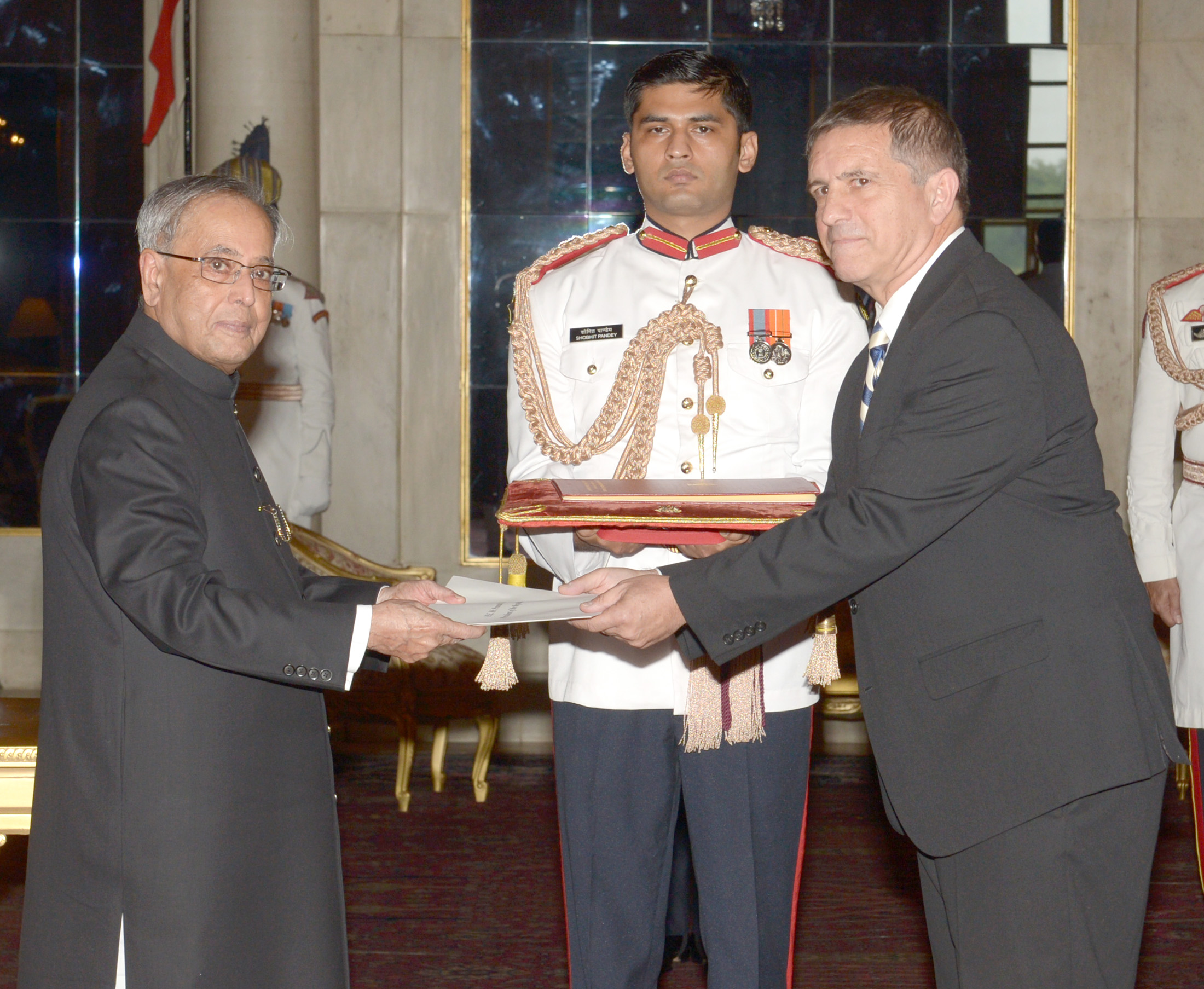
Ambassador-designate Carmon presenting his credential to President of India Pranab Mukherjee (31 July 2014)

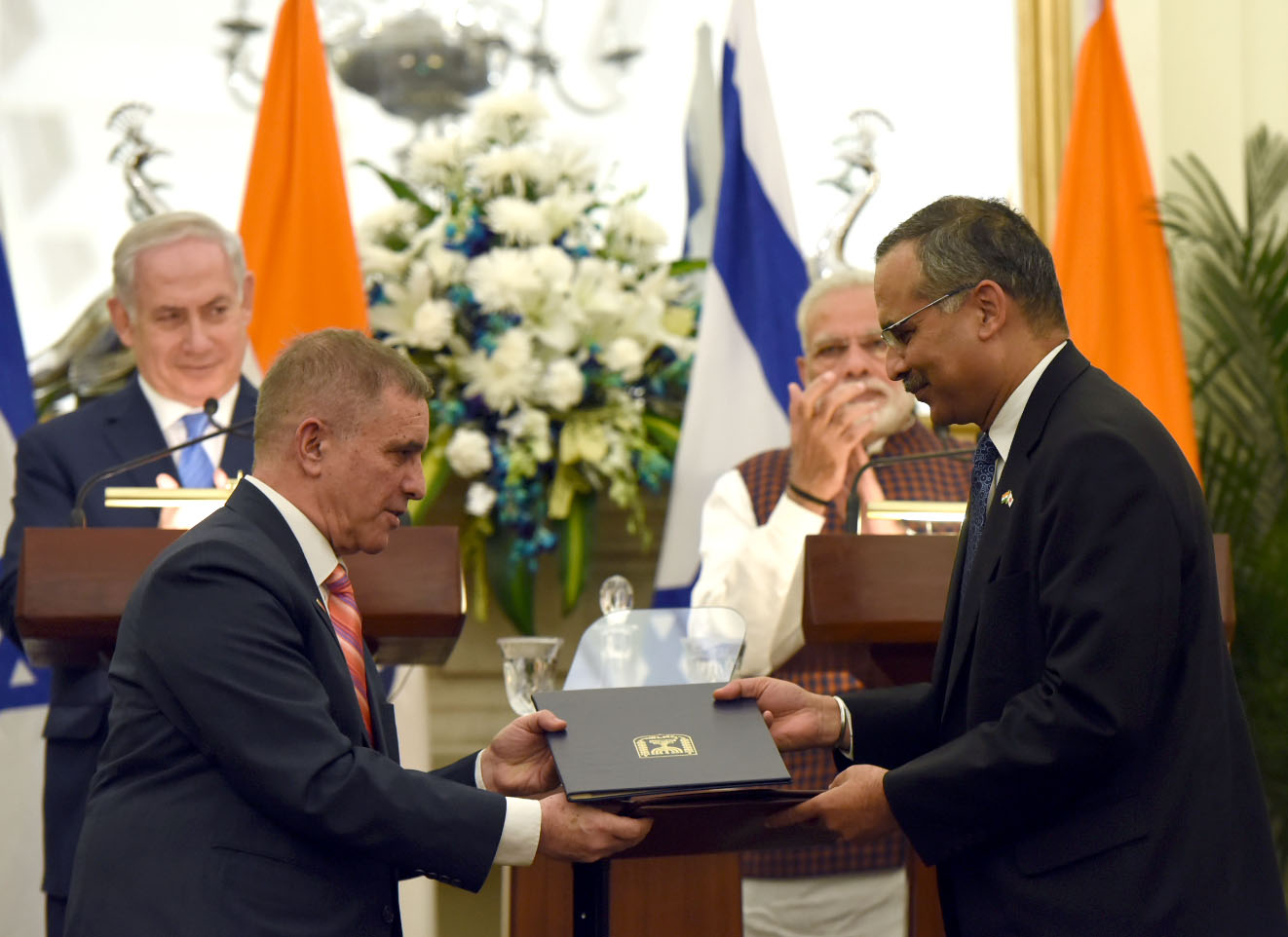
Carmon exchanging MoUs/Agreements in the presence of Prime Minister of India Narendra Modi and Prime Minister of Israel Benjamin Netanyahu, at Hyderabad House in New Delhi (15 January 2018)

After his graduation from Hebrew University in 1973, he joined the Ministry of Foreign Affairs. From 1978 to 1982, he served as an attaché at the Embassy of Israel in Washington, D.C., United States, during which he served as a member of the Israeli delegation to the 1978 Camp David peace talks between Israel and Egypt. From 1983 to 1985, he worked at a high-tech company as its commercial director, before returning to the Ministry of Foreign Affairs.

Carmon served as the Consul and Administrative Officer, and as Deputy Chief of Mission at the Embassy of Israel in Buenos Aires, Argentina. On 17 March 1992, the embassy was attacked by a suicide bomber, killing 29 civilians and injuring 242 more. Among the dead was Carmon's wife Eliora, while Carmon himself was injured in the attack.

In 1995, he returned to Israel where he was assigned to the Situation Emergency Room in the Foreign Ministry, where he served as its head. After serving in numerous positions within the ministry, he was appointed as Ambassador and Deputy Permanent Representative at Israel's Mission to the United Nations in New York in 2005.

From 2011 to 2014, he served as Deputy Director General of the Foreign Affairs Ministry and as head of MASHAV, which is Israel's agency for international development cooperation, and later as the Senior Deputy Director-General within the Foreign Affairs Ministry.

In July 2014, Carmon was appointed as Ambassador of Israel to India and Non-Resident Ambassador to Sri Lanka and Bhutan. On July 31, he presented his credentials to President of India Pranab Mukherjee. Carmon served this position till 2018 and was succeeded by Ron Malka.

== Personal life ==
Carmon has six children with his wife Eliora, who was killed in the 1992 Buenos Aires Israeli embassy bombing. He is fluent in Hebrew, English, Spanish and French.

In 2013, he was recipient of the highest award of Excellence of Israel's Public Service.
