= Reuven Azar =

Israeli diplomat (born 1967)

- ראובן עזר
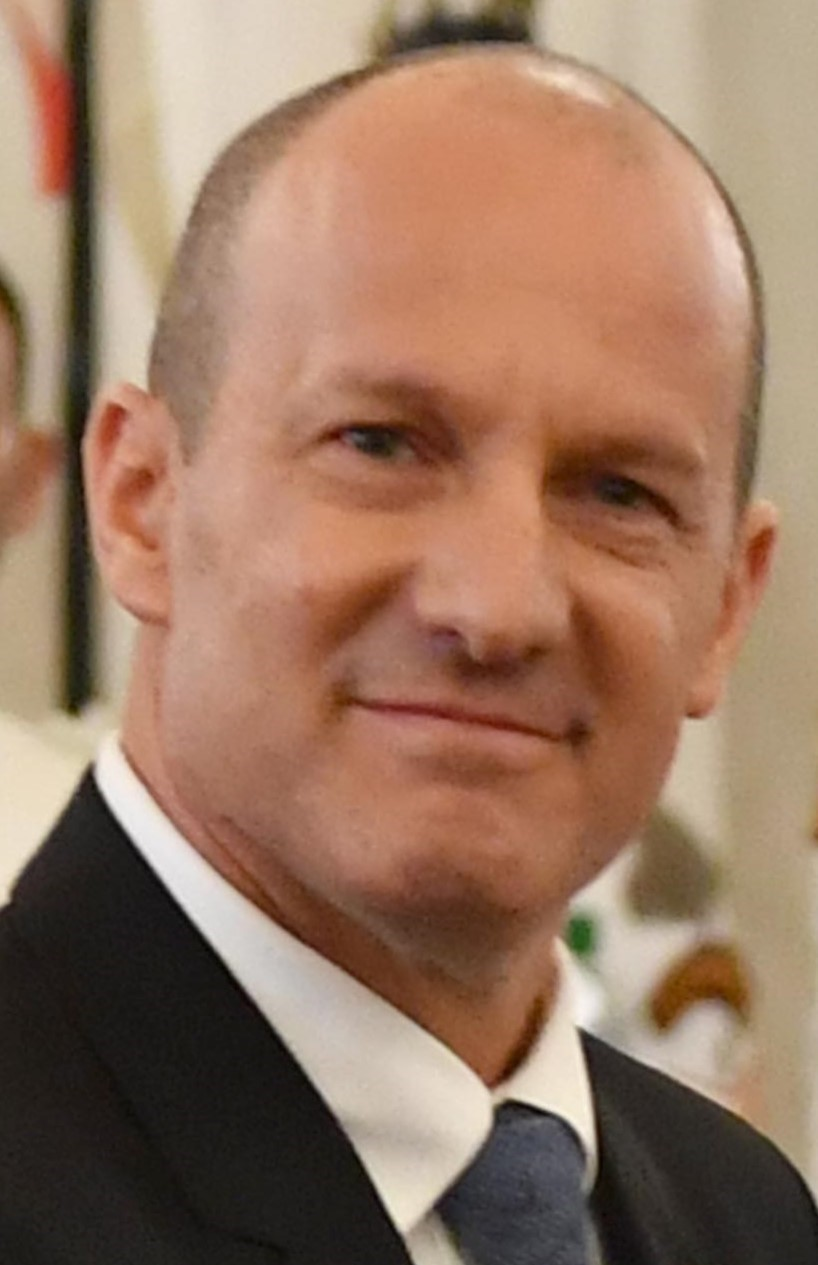

10th Ambassador of Israel to India, Sri Lanka and Bhutan
- Incumbent
- Assumed office August 2024
- Prime Minister: Benjamin Netanyahu
- Preceded by: Naor Gilon

15th Israel Ambassador to Romania
- In office 10 August 2022 – August 2024
- Prime Minister: Yair Lapid
- Preceded by: David Saranga

Personal details
- Born: Argentina
- Education: Hebrew University (B.A., M.A.)

Reuven Azar (Hebrew: ראובן עזר) is an Israeli diplomat who is currently serving as the Ambassador to India since August 2024. He previously served as Ambassador of Israel to Romania from 2022 to 2024.

== Biography ==
Azar was born in Argentina in 1967, and immigrated to Jerusalem with his family at age 13. He served in a Paratroopers Brigade of the IDF from 1985 to 1988.

Azar was Deputy Chief of Mission for the Embassy of Israel, Washington, D.C. between 2014 and 2018. After serving in Washington he returned to Israel and served as deputy adviser for national security and foreign policy with the National Security Council and a foreign policy adviser for the prime minister of Israel Benjamin Netanyahu.

Azar was appointed Ambassador of Israel to Romania in January 2022 and assumed office in August 2022.

Azar met George Simion, head of the far-right Alliance for the Union of Romanians, an act that drew criticism from the Yad Vashem Holocaust center.

On 17 December 2023, the Israeli government approved the appointment of Azar as the new Ambassador to India, and the non-resident Ambassador to Sri Lanka and Bhutan. On 6 September 2024, he along with ambassadors of four other nations presented their credentials to President of India Droupadi Murmu.
