= Naor Gilon =

Israeli diplomat

- נאור גילאון
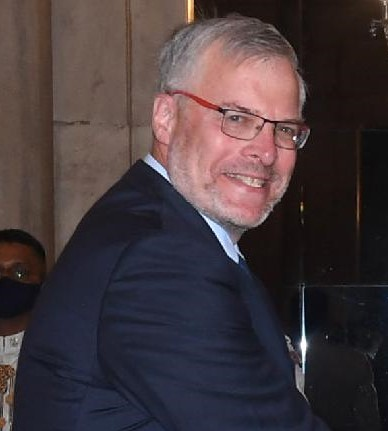
- Gilon in 2021

Israeli Ambassador to India
- In office 2021–2024
- Preceded by: Ron Malka
- Succeeded by: Reuven Azar

Israeli Ambassador to the Netherlands
- In office 2019–2021
- Preceded by: Aviv Shir-On
- Succeeded by: Modi Ephraim

Israeli Ambassador to Italy
- In office 2012–2016
- Preceded by: Gideon Meir
- Succeeded by: Ofer Sachs

Personal details
- Born: 1964 (age 61–62) Israel
- Education: Tel Aviv University; Corvinus University of Budapest

Naor Gilon (Hebrew: נאור גילאון) was Israel's ambassador to India and non resident ambassador to Sri Lanka and Bhutan. He was ambassador of Israel to the Netherlands (2019-2021), Italy and San Marino (Feb 2012 – Aug 2016).

== Biography ==
Naor Gilon was born in Israel. His father was from Germany, and was a Holocaust survivor. Gilon received his BA in political science at Tel Aviv University and his Master's degree summa cum laude in international relations at Corvinus University of Budapest. He is married with four children.

== Diplomatic career ==
Gilon joined the Ministry of Foreign Affairs in 1989 and served as the deputy chief of missions at the Embassy of Israel in Hungary (1990–1995), deputy foreign policy advisor to the prime minister (1995–1997), counselor for political affairs at the permanent mission to the United Nations (1997–2000), and as director of the Division for Strategic and Military Affairs in the Center for Policy Research in Ministry of Foreign Affairs (2000–2002).

As a minister-counselor for political affairs at the Embassy of Israel in Washington, D.C., he was the subject of FBI investigations into the Lawrence Franklin espionage scandal, which involved the leaking of classified information by an employee at the United States Department of Defense.

According to Israeli journalist Shmuel Rosner, Gilon's return to the U.S. in late 2005 was an indication that "no serious allegations concerning Israel's involvement in the American Israel Public Affairs Committee (AIPAC) affair still exist."

In 2009, he served as the chief of staff to Minister of Foreign Affairs Avigdor Lieberman and as the deputy director general for Western Europe division at the Ministry of Foreign Affairs from 2009 to 2011

In 2021, it was announced that he would be the new ambassador of Israel to India. On October 27, he presented his credentials to President of India Ram Nath Kovind.
