= List of Israeli ambassadors =

The following is a list of Israeli ambassadors.

== Current Israeli ambassadors ==
Updated March 31, 2025.

Host state (common name)	Ref	Israeli ambassador	Embassy website
Albania		Galit Peleg	Tirana
Angola		Shimon Solomon	Luanda
Argentina		Eyal Sela	Buenos Aires
Australia		Amir Maimon	Canberra
Austria		David Roet	Vienna
Azerbaijan	Ref	George Deek	Baku
Bahrain		Eitan Na'eh	Manama
Belarus		Tzevy Mirkin	Minsk
Belgium		Idit Rosenzweig-Abu	Brussels
Brazil		Daniel Zohar Zonshine	Brasilia
Bulgaria		Yosi Levi Sfari	Sofia
Cameroon		Amnon Kalmar	Yaoundé
Canada		Iddo Moed	Ottawa
Chile		Peleg Lewi	Santiago
China		Irit Ben-Abba	Beijing
Colombia		Marco Sermoneta	Bogotá
Costa Rica		Michal Gur-Aryeh	San José
Croatia		Gary Koren	Zagreb
Cyprus		Oren Anolik	Nicosia
Czech Republic		Anna Azari	Prague
Denmark		David Akov	Copenhagen
Dominican Republic		Daniel Biran Bayor	Santo Domingo
Ecuador		Tzach Sarid	Quito
Egypt	Ref	Amira Oron	Cairo
Eritrea		Gadi Harpaz	Asmara
Ethiopia		Avraham Neguise	Addis Ababa
Finland		Boaz Rodkin	Helsinki
France		Joshua L. Zarka	Paris
Georgia		Hadas Meitzad	Tbilisi
Germany		Ron Prosor	Berlin
Ghana		Roey Gilad	Accra
Greece		Noam Katz	Athens
Guatemala		Alon Lavi	Guatemala City
Holy See		Raphael Schutz	Vatican
Hungary		Avi Nir Feldklein	Budapest
India		Reuven Azar	New Delhi
Ireland		vacant	Dublin
Italy		Jonathan Peled	Rome
Ivory Coast		Rony Yedidia Clein	Abidjan
Japan		Gilad Cohen	Tokyo
Jordan		Rogel Rachman	Amman
Kazakhstan		Edwin Nathan Yabo Glusman	Astana
Kenya		Michael Lotem	Nairobi
Latvia		Lironne Bar-Sade	Riga
Lithuania		Hadas Wittenberg Silverstein	Vilnius
Mexico		Einat Kranz Neiger	Mexico City
Myanmar		Ruth Zakh	Yangon
Nepal		Shmulik Arie Bass	Kathmandu
Netherlands		Modi Ephraim	The Hague
Nigeria		Michael Freeman	Abuja
Norway		Yana Kotlyar-Gal (Chargée d'affaires)	Oslo
Panama		Itai Bardov	Panama City
Paraguay		Amit Mekel	Asunción
Peru		Eran Yuvan	Lima
Philippines		Ilan Fluss	Manila
Poland		Yaakov Finkelstein (Chargée d'affaires)	Warsaw
Portugal		Oren Rozenblat	Lisbon
Romania		Lior Ben Dor	Bucharest
Russia		Simone Halperin	Moscow
Senegal		Ben Bourgel	Dakar
Serbia		Avivit Bar-Ilan	Belgrade
Singapore		Eliyahu Vered Hazan	Singapore
Slovakia		Eitan Levon	Bratislava
South Africa		Adi Cohen-Hazanov (Chargée d'affaires)	Pretoria
South Korea		Rafael Harpaz	Seoul
South Sudan		Hanan Goder	Juba
Spain		Dana Erlich (head of mission)	Madrid
Sweden		Ziv Nevo Kulman	Stockholm
Switzerland		Ifat Reshef	Bern
Thailand		Orna Sagiv	Bangkok
Ukraine		Michael Brodsky	Kyiv
United Arab Emirates		Yossi Avraham Shelley	Abu Dhabi
United Kingdom		Tzipi Hotovely	London
United States	Ref	Yechiel Leiter	Washington
Uruguay		Michal Hershkovitz	Montevideo
Uzbekistan		Gideon Lustig	Tashkent
Vietnam		Yaron Mayer	Hanoi

== Ambassadors to international organizations ==
Host organization	Ref	Location (website)	Ambassador
Conference on Disarmament		Geneva, Switzerland	Eviatar Manor
European Union		Brussels, Belgium	Aharon Leshno-Yaar
International Civil Aviation Organization		Montreal, Canada	Joel Lion
International Renewable Energy Agency		Abu Dhabi, United Arab Emirates	Rami Hatan
Organization for Security and Cooperation in Europe		Vienna, Austria	Aviv Shir-on
United Nations	Ref	New York, United States	Danny Danon
United Nations Educational, Scientific and Cultural Organization and Organization of Economic Cooperation and Development		Paris, France	Nimrod Barkan
United Nations Environment Programme		Nairobi, Kenya	Gil Haskel
United Nations Food and Agriculture Organization		Rome, Italy	Gila Livnat Rosiner
United Nations International Organizations in Geneva		Geneva, Switzerland	Daniel Meron
United Nations International Organizations in Vienna		Vienna, Austria	Aviv Shir-on

== Consuls general ==
Updated April 23, 2020.

Host state (common name)	Ref	Israeli consul	Consulate website
Brazil		Dori Goren	São Paulo
Canada		David Levy (diplomat)	Montreal
Canada		Galit Baram	Toronto
China		Nadav Cohen	Guangzhou
China		Ahuva Spieler	Hong Kong
China		Eyal Propper	Shanghai
Egypt		Meir Lefkowitz	Alexandria
Germany		Sandra Simovich	Munich
India		Dana Kursh	Bangalore
India		Yaakov Finkelstein	Mumbai
Russia		Olga Slov	St. Petersburg
Turkey		Yosef Levi-Sfari	Istanbul
United Arab Emirates		Ilan Sztulman	Dubai
United States		Anat Sultan-Dadon	Atlanta
United States		Zeev Boker	Boston
United States		Aviv Ezra	Chicago
United States		Gilad Katz	Houston
United States		Israel Bachar	Los Angeles
United States		Lior Haiat	Miami
United States		Dani Dayan	New York
United States		Yaron Sideman	Philadelphia
United States		Shlomi Kofman	San Francisco

== Other senior diplomatic representatives ==
Host state	Representative	Title
Armenia	Eliyahu Yerushalmi	Ambassador, based in Jerusalem
Kyrgyzstan	Liat Wexelman	Ambassador, based in Jerusalem
North Macedonia	Dan Oryan	Ambassador, based in Jerusalem
Slovenia	Eyal Sela	Ambassador, based in Jerusalem
Turkmenistan	Moshe Kimhi	Ambassador, based in Jerusalem

== Current and past ambassadors ==
Ambassador	Host state or organization	Years
Moshe Arens	United States	
Shlomo Argov	Mexico, Netherlands, United Kingdom	
Yehuda Avner	Great Britain, Ireland, Australia	
Daniel Ayalon	United States	
Anna Azari	Ukraine & Moldova	
Alan Baker	Canada	
Naomi Ben-Ami	Ukraine	
Yaffa Ben-Ari	Serbia	
Ephraim Ben-Matityau	Vietnam	
Eli Cohen	Japan	
Mattanya Cohen	El Salvador, Belize	2007–2011
Shlomo Cohen	Venezuela (expelled in January 2009)	
Yaacov Cohen	Spain, Venezuela, the European Union, and Japan & South Korea	
Yohanan Cohen	Romania and Finland	
Abba Eban	United States, United Nations	
Israel Eliashiv	Singapore	1987–1990
Dan Gillerman	United Nations	
Carmi Gillon	Denmark	
Dore Gold	United Nations	
Shmuel Hadas	Vatican	
Yehoyada Haim	China	
Chaim Herzog	United Nations	
Menahem Kanafi	Eritrea	
Arthur Lenk	Azerbaijan	
Joseph Ivor Linton	Japan	
Zvi Magen	Ukraine, Russia	
Eviatar Manor	Sweden	
Walid Mansour	Vietnam, Peru	
Yitzchak Mayer	Switzerland, Belgium, Luxembourg	
Zvi Mazel	Romania, Egypt, Sweden	
Daniel Megiddo	Ireland	
Gideon Meir	Italy	
Golda Meir	Soviet Union	
Sallai Meridor	United States	
Ora Namir	China	1996–2000
Benjamin Netanyahu	United Nations	1984–1988
David Peleg	Poland	
Avi Primor	Germany	
Yitzhak Rabin	United States	
Itamar Rabinovich	United States	
Gad Ranon	Portugal	1985–1988
Yael Rubinstein	Singapore	2013–2017
Rafi Schutz	Spain	
Yoel Sher	Togo, Hong Kong, Czech Republic, Slovakia, Austria, Slovenia	
Zalman Shoval	United States	
Naftali Tamir	New Zealand	
Shevah Weiss	Poland	
Ali Yahya	Finland	
Nissim Zvili	France	

== Lists by country or organization ==
- List of ambassadors of Israel to Albania
- List of ambassadors of Israel to Angola
- List of ambassadors of Israel to Antigua and Barbuda
- List of ambassadors of Israel to Argentina
- List of ambassadors of Israel to Armenia
- List of ambassadors of Israel to Australia
- List of ambassadors of Israel to Austria
- List of ambassadors of Israel to Azerbaijan
- List of ambassadors of Israel to the Bahamas
- List of ambassadors of Israel to Bolivia
- List of ambassadors of Israel to Bosnia and Herzegovina
- List of ambassadors of Israel to Brazil
- List of ambassadors of Israel to Canada
- List of ambassadors of Israel to China
- List of ambassadors of Israel to the Republic of Congo
- List of ambassadors of Israel to Costa Rica
- List of ambassadors of Israel to Croatia
- List of ambassadors of Israel to Cuba
- List of ambassadors of Israel to Cyprus
- List of ambassadors of Israel to the Czech Republic
- List of ambassadors of Israel to Denmark
- List of ambassadors of Israel to Ecuador
- List of ambassadors of Israel to Egypt
- List of ambassadors of Israel to El Salvador
- List of ambassadors of Israel to the European Union
- List of ambassadors of Israel to Finland
- List of ambassadors of Israel to France
- List of ambassadors of Israel to Germany
- List of ambassadors of Israel to Guatemala
- List of ambassadors of Israel to the Holy See
- List of ambassadors of Israel to Honduras
- List of ambassadors of Israel to international organizations
- List of ambassadors of Israel to Ireland
- List of ambassadors of Israel to Italy
- List of ambassadors of Israel to Kyrgyzstan
- List of ambassadors of Israel to Latvia
- List of ambassadors of Israel to Lithuania
- List of ambassadors of Israel to Nicaragua
- List of ambassadors of Israel to Poland
- List of ambassadors of Israel to Russia
- List of ambassadors of Israel to Spain
- List of ambassadors of Israel to Switzerland
- List of ambassadors of Israel to Turkey
- List of ambassadors of Israel to Ukraine
- List of ambassadors of Israel to the United Kingdom
- Permanent representative of Israel to the United Nations
- List of ambassadors of Israel to the United States
- List of ambassadors of Israel to Uruguay
- List of ambassadors of Israel to Zimbabwe
