= List of ambassadors of Israel to International Organizations =

Israeli Ambassadors to the United Nations (New York), United Nations (Geneva), IAEA & CTBTO Prepcom (Vienna), OECD (Paris), OECD & UNESCO (Paris), NATO (Brussels), United Nations & OSCE (Vienna), CARICOM (Georgetown), and FAO, WFP & IFAD (Rome)

== Ambassadors to CARICOM ==
- Itai Bardov 2021-
- Reda Mansour 2018-2021
- Mordehai Amihai-Bivas 2015 - 2018
- Amiram Magid 2013 - 2015

== Ambassadors to FAO, WFP & IFAD ==
- Ofer Sachs 2016 - 2019 (concurrently ambassador to Italy, San Marino)
- Ehud Gol 2002 - 2006

== Ambassadors to IAEA & CTBTO Prepcom ==
- Merav Zafary-Odiz 2013 -
- Ehud Azulay 2009 - 2013
- Israel Michaeli 2004 - 2009
- Gabriella Gafni 2001 - 2004
- Giyora Amir 1996 - 2001
- Yosef Altar 1991 - 1996
- Minister Ran Marom 1988 - 1991
- Minister David Ranen 1985 - 1988
- Minister Shalom Katz 1981 - 1985
- Minister Ephraim Tari 1978 - 1981
- Minister Ehud Avivi 1975 - 1978
- Minister Yehuda Eden 1971 - 1975
- Minister Michael Doron 1968 - 1971
- Minister Naftali Shimron 1963 - 1968
- Minister Itzhak Keenan 1959 - 1963
- Ambassador Yeheskel Sahar 1959
- Minister Moshe Dak 1958
- Minister Shmuel Bentsur 1957

== Ambassadors to NATO ==
- Haim Regev 2021-
- Aharon Leshno-Yaar 2016 - 2021

== Ambassadors to OECD ==
- Eli Emanuel Lev 2018 -
- Meir Shamir (diplomat) 1983 - 1986

== Ambassadors to OECD and UNESCO ==
- Carmel Shama Hacohen 2014 - 2018
- Nimrod Barkan 2010 - 2014
- Yael Vered 1979 - 1983
- Mordechay Avida 1972 - 1974
- Moshe Avidor 1968 - 1971
- Mordechay Avida 1966 - 1968

== Ambassadors to the United Nations (Geneva) ==
- Aviva Raz Shechter 2016 - 2020
- Eviatar Manor 2012 - 2016
- Aharon Leshno-Yaar 2008 - 2012
- Itzhak Levanon 2004 - 2008
- Yaakov Levy 2000 - 2004
- David Peleg 1998 - 2000
- Nevill-Yosef Lamdan 1994 - 1998
- Yithak Leor 1990 - 1994
- Ephraim Dowek 1983 - 1986
- Ovadia Sofer 1981 - 1983
- Joel Baromi 1977 - 1981
- Eitan Ron 1974 - 1977
- Gideon Rafael 1965 - 1966
- Moshe Bartur 1961 - 1965
- Menachem Kahany 1955 - 1956

== Ambassadors to the United Nations in New York ==
See Permanent Representative of Israel to the United Nations

== Ambassadors to the United Nations & OSCE (Vienna) ==
- Talya Lador-Fresher 2015 - 2019
- Zvi Heifetz 2013 - 2015
- Aviv Shir-On 2009 - 2013
- Dan Ashbel 2005 - 2009
- Avraham Toledo 2004 (Charge d'Affaires a.i. 2001 - 2004)
- Charge d'Affaires a.i. Ilan Ben-Dov (diplomat) 2000 - 2001
- Nathan Meron 1998 - 2000
- Yoel Sher 1995 - 1998
- Yosef Govrin 1990 - 1993
- Charge d'Affaires a.i. Gideon Yarden 1986 - 1990
- Michel Elizur 1984 - 1986
- Issaschar Ben-Yaacov 1979 - 1983
- Yaacov Doron 1977 - 1979
- Avigdor Dagan 1974 - 1977
- Yitzhak Patish 1971 - 1974
- Zeev Shek 1967 - 1971
- Michael Simon (diplomat) 1963 - 1967
- Nathan Peled 1961 - 1963
- Yehezkil Sahar 1958 - 1960
