= List of ambassadors of Israel to Lesotho =

The Ambassador from Israel to Lesotho is Israel's foremost diplomatic representative in Lesotho.

== List of ambassadors ==
- Lior Keinan (Non-Resident, Pretoria) 2017 -
- Arye Oded
- Emmanuel Ron (Non-Resident, Mbabane) 1979 - 1980
- Meir Gavish (Non-Resident, Mbabane) 1976 - 1979
- Charge d'Affaires a.i. Mordechai Palzur (Non-Resident, Pretoria)
- Arthur Lenk (Non-Resident) 2013 - 2017
