= List of ambassadors of Israel to Canada =

The Ambassador of Israel to Canada is Israel's foremost diplomatic representative in Canada. The Ambassador is based in the Embassy of Israel, Ottawa. The current ambassador is Iddo Moed.

== List of ambassadors ==
- Iddo Moed 2024 - present
- Ronen Hoffman 2021 - 2023
- Nimrod Barkan 2016 - 2022
- Rafael Barak 2013 - 2016
- Miriam Ziv 2008 - 2013
- Alan Baker (diplomat) 2004 - 2008
- Haim Divon 2000 - 2004
- David Sultan 1996 - 2000
- Itzhak Selef 1990 - 1995
- Israel Gur Arie 1987 - 1990
- Eliashiv Ben-Horin 1984 - 1987
- Yeshayahu Anug 1979 - 1984
- Mordechai Shalev 1975 - 1979
- Theodor Meron 1971 - 1975
- Ephraim Evron 1969 - 1971
- Rome Sinai 1968 - 1969
- Arie Eshel 1967 - 1968
- Avner Gershon 1963 - 1967
- Mesholam Veron 1963
- Ambassador Yaacov Herzog 1960 - 1963
- Arthur Lourie (diplomat) 1957-1959
- Ambassador Michael Comay 1954 - 1957 (Minister 1953 - 1954)

=== Consulate (Montreal) ===
- Paul Hirschson 2021 - 2023
- Consul General David Levy (diplomat) 2018 - 2021
- Ziv Nevo Kulman 2014 - 2017
- Gideon Saguy 1982 - 1986
- David Rivlin 1962 - 1965
- Joel Lion 2011 - 2014
- Yoram Elron 2007 - 2011
- Marc Attali 2003 - 2007
- Shlomo Avital 1999 - 2003
- Daniel Gal 1994 - 1999
- Itzhak Levanon 1990 - 1994
- Yakov Aviad 1983 - 1986
- Zvi Caspi 1977 - 1980, 1966 - 1968
- Davir Efrati 1971 - 1973
- Michael Simon (diplomat) 1957 - 1960
- Yehuda Gaulan 1954 - 1957
- Moshe Yuval 1950 - 1952
- Avraham Harman 1949 - 1950

== Consulate (Toronto) ==
- Idit Shamir 2021-
- Galit Baram August 2016 - 2021
- David Schneeweiss 2012 - 2016
- Amir Reshef-Gissin 2007 - 2012
- Ya'acov Brosh 2003 - 2007
- Meir Romem 1999 - 2003
- Jehudi Kinar 1995 - 1999
- Benjamin Abileah 1987 - 1991
- David Ariel 1978 - 1982
- Shmuel Ovnat 1972 - 1977
- Aba Gefen 1967 - 1971
