= Ilan Ben-Dov =

Ilan Ben-Dov may refer to:

- Ilan Ben-Dov (businessman)
- Ilan Ben-Dov (diplomat)
