= List of ambassadors of Israel to Azerbaijan =

This is a list of Israel's ambassadors to Azerbaijan.

1. Eliezer Yotvat, 1994–1997
2. Arkady (Alek) Milman, 1997–1999
3. Eitan Naeh, 2001–2005
4. Arthur Lenk, 2005–2009
5. Michael Lavon-Lotem, 2009–2012
6. Rafael Harpaz, 2012–2015
7. Dan Stav, 2015–2019
8. George Deek, 2019–

== See also ==
- List of Israeli ambassadors
