= Lior Keinan =

Israeli diplomat

- ליאור קינן

4th Israeli Ambassador to Lesotho
- Incumbent
- Assumed office 2017
- President: Reuven Rivlin; Isaac Herzog
- Preceded by: Arthur Lenk (Acting)

9th Israeli Ambassador to Eswatini
- Incumbent
- Assumed office 2017
- President: Reuven Rivlin; Isaac Herzog
- Preceded by: Arthur Lenk

3rd Israeli Ambassador to Mauritius
- Incumbent
- Assumed office 2017
- President: Reuven Rivlin; Isaac Herzog
- Preceded by: Arye Oded

10th Israeli Ambassador to South Africa
- In office 2017–2018
- President: Reuven Rivlin
- Preceded by: Arthur Lenk
- Succeeded by: Eliav Belotsercovsky

Personal details
- Education: Hebrew University (B.A.); Derby University (M.B.A.)

Lior Keinan (Hebrew: ליאור קינן) is the Ambassador of Israel to South Africa since 2017, Lesotho, Eswatini and Mauritius. In 2018, Madagascar was added to his portfolio.

Keinen earned a BA Degree in International Relations from the Hebrew University and an MBA from the University of Derby, Tel Aviv Campus.
