= List of ambassadors of Israel to Ecuador =

The Ambassador from Israel to Ecuador was Israel's foremost diplomatic representative in Ecuador

== List of former ambassadors ==
- Tzach Sarid 2023 - present
- Edwin Yabo 2016 - 2023
- Eliyahu Yerushalmi 2012-2016
- Eyal Sela 2007 - 2012
- Daniel Saban 2003 - 2007
- Reda Mansour 2001 - 2003
- Yosef Hasseen 1999 - 2001
- Yaacov Paran 1996 - 1999
- Medad Medina 1991 - 1996
- Avraham Setton 1987 - 1991
- Zvi Tenney 1984 - 1987
- Eliezer Armon (Non-Resident, Guatemala City) 1981 - 1984
- Naftali Gal 1978
- Sinai Rome 1976 - 1978
- Avraham Sarlouis 1964 - 1967
- Eliezer Doron (Non-Resident, Santiago) 1962 - 1963
- Tuvia Arazi (Non-Resident, Lima) 1956 - 1960
