= List of ambassadors of Israel to Costa Rica =

The Ambassador from Israel to Costa Rica is Israel's foremost diplomatic representative in Costa Rica.

== List of ambassadors ==
- Amir Ofek (2017 - 2018)
- Haddad Avraham (2013 - 2017)
- Daniel Saban (2010 - 2013)
- Ehud Eitam 2006 - 2010
- Alexander Ben-Zvi 2002 - 2006
- Daniel Gal 1999 - 2002
- Yaakov Brakha 1997 - 1999
- Shlomo Tal 1994 - 1997
- Nehamia Tevel 1989 - 1993
- David Tourgeman 1982 - 1986
- Hagai Dikan 1979 - 1982
- Chanan Olami 1976 - 1979
- Jeonathan Prato 1969 - 1972
- Walter Abeles 1966 - 1969
- Joshua Nissim Shai (Non-Resident, Guatemala City) 1959 - 1964
- David Shaltiel (Non-Resident, Mexico City) 1956 - 1959
- Minister Yossef Keisari (Non-Resident, Mexico City) 1954 - 1956
