= List of ambassadors of Israel to Mauritius =

The Ambassador from Israel to Mauritius is Israel's foremost diplomatic representative in Mauritius.

== List of ambassadors ==
- Lior Keinan (Non-Resident, Pretoria) 2017 -
- Arye Oded
- Zvi Loker (Non-Resident, Antananarivo) 1967 - 1970
