= Alisa Ehrmann-Shek =

Holocaust survivor

Alisa “Alice” Ehrmann-Shek (May 5, 1927, Prague-2007) was a Holocaust survivor whose diary documents the last six months of the Theresienstadt Ghetto.

She and her husband were two of the founders of the Beit Theresienstadt museum, opened in 1975.

== Biography ==
Alice's father, Rudolf Ehrmann, was an architect. Her mother Pavla was born Catholic in Vienna. When she married, she did not practice any religion. Alice and her older sister neither attended religious schools nor did they practice Judaism though they always knew of their Jewish heritage.

Both Alice and her husband Zeev Shek were Czechoslovak and Theresienstadt survivors. They knew each other from Prague's Zionist youth movement. She was deported to the Theresienstadt ghetto in 1943 and the couple secretly married there. They were separated when Shek volunteered to go with his mother to Auschwitz. They reunited after the war and emigrated to Israel in 1946. In Israel, Shek was the personal secretary to Moshe Sharett and was an ambassador. Alice became an artist and they had three children. Son Daniel Shek is also an ambassador.

== Diary ==
Her diary is 33 pages long, includes drawings she made and is written in German but uses Hebrew letters. When her husband was leaving to go to Auschwitz, he insisted she keep the diary. The diary covers the period between October 1944 and May 1945 and was published in April 2018 under the title I think of an eternal summer.
