= List of ambassadors of Israel to Austria =

The Ambassador from Israel to Austria is Israel's foremost diplomatic representative in Austria.

== List of ambassadors ==
- David Roet 2023-present
- Mordechai Rodgold 2019–2023
- Talya Lador-Fresher 2015–2019
- Zvi Heifetz 2013–2015
- Aviv Shir-On 2009–2013
- Dan Ashbel 2005–2009
- Avraham Toledo 2004 (Charge d'Affaires a.i. 2001–2004)
- Charge d'Affaires a.i. Ilan Ben-Dov (diplomat) 2000–2001
- Nathan Meron 1998–2000
- Yoel Sher(Diplomat) 1995–1998
- Yosef Govrin 1993–1995
- Uriel Aran 1990–1993
- Charge d'Affaires a.i. Gideon Yarden 1986–1990
- Michael Elizur 1983–1986
- Yissakhar Ben-Yaakov 1979–1983
- Yaacov Doron 1977–1979
- Avigdor Dagan 1974–1977
- Yitzhak Patish 1971–1974
- Zeev Shek 1967–1971
- Michael Simon (diplomat) 1963–1967
- Natan Peled 1961–1963
- Yehezkil Sahar 1958–1960
- Minister Shmuel Bentsur 1956–1958

== Consulate (Vienna) ==
- Consul General Shmuel Bentsur 1956–1958
- Consul General Arye Eschel 1950–1955
