= Ran Ichay =

Israeli diplomat and humanitarian

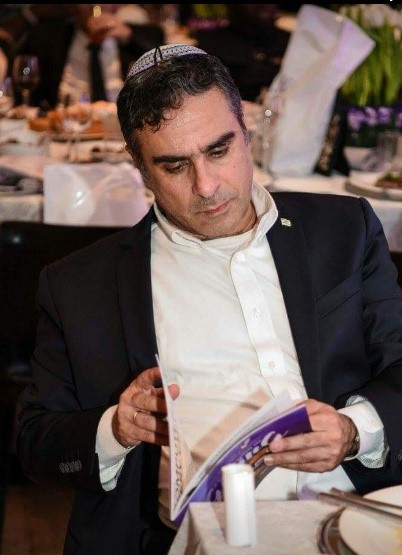
- Ran Ichay

Israeli Ambassador to Kazakhstan
- In office August 2006 – September 2008
- Minister: Tzipi Livni
- Preceded by: Michael Lotem
- Succeeded by: Israel Mei Ami

Ministry of Jerusalem
- In office November 2016 – January 2019
- Minister: Ze'ev Elkin
- Preceded by: Sarit Goldstein
- Succeeded by: Mordechai Benita

Personal details
- Born: 1970 (age 55–56) Israel
- Education: Bar-Ilan University
- Awards: Knight-Commander of the Royal Order of Omukama Chwa II Kabalega; Kazakh Order of Jubilee Officer of the Order of Saint George (Kingdom of Hungary)

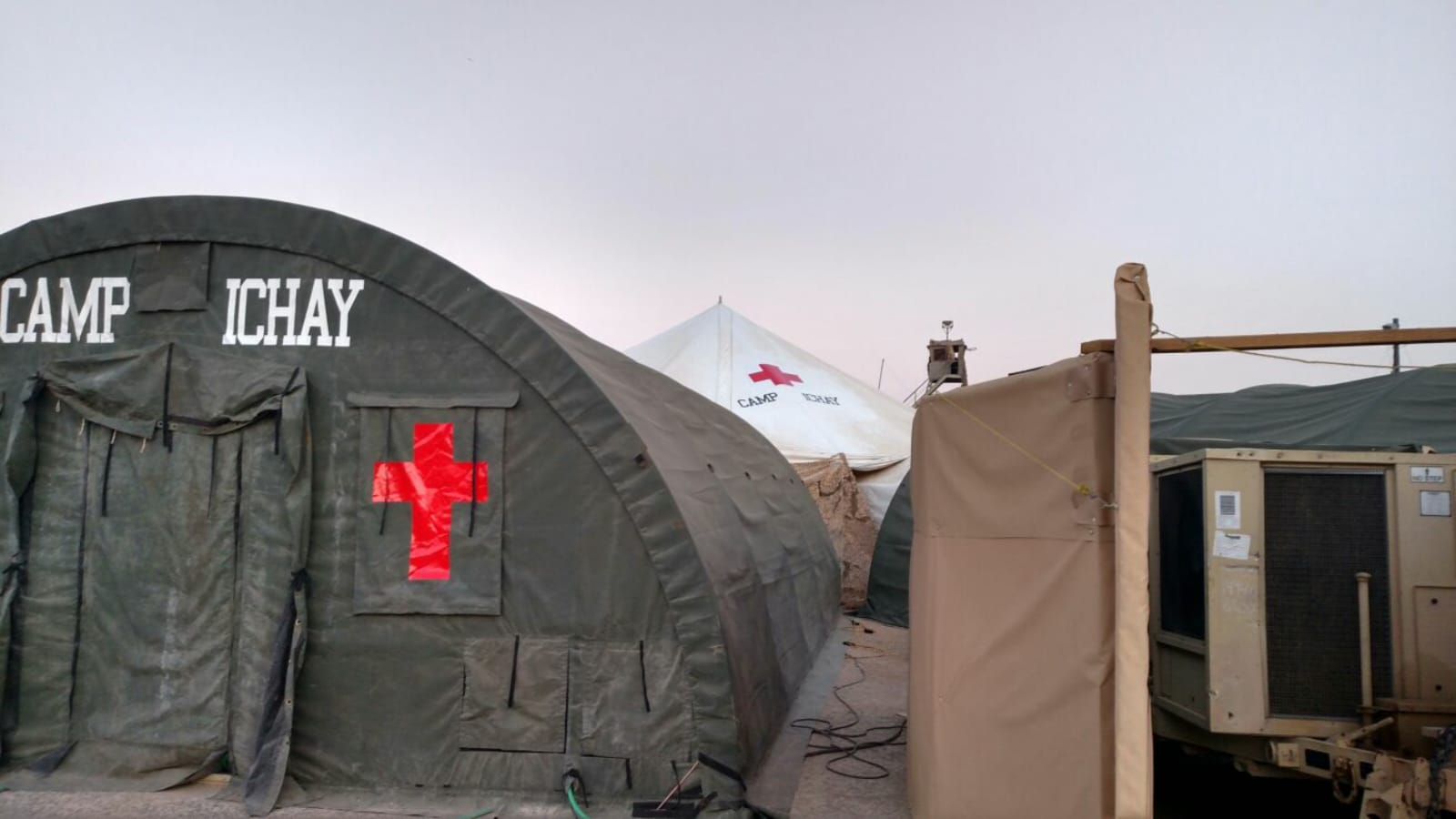
Camp Ichay, Syria, 2017

Ran Ichay (Hebrew: רן ישי; born 1970) is an Israeli humanitarian, and a former diplomat and civil servant.

== Biography ==
Ichay was born to families that immigrated to Israel after the independence. His father's family fled from Spain to North Africa in the first decades of the 15th century due to the persecutions against Jews. The family lived mainly in Sousse, in Tunisia, and owned the House of Ichay, where many of the family's children were born, and later fled to Israel due to the Kadesh war, in 1956. His mother's family, Shor (Arabic: bani-Tabi' - meaning: of-the-Ox), fled from Yemen during the Israeli war of independebce. Ichay graduated school and joined the Israeli Navy in 1988 as a midshipman, before transferring to the Artillery where he served until 1992. He currently serves as a volunteer in the Israeli border guard, ranked Major, and in the Police Aerial Unit, as a flight-observer.

He later joined the Ministry of Foreign Affairs as a cadet in 1995, upon graduating Bar-Ilan University. Starting in 1999 and until 2001 he worked in the Embassy of Israel in Brussels and in the Israeli Mission to the European Communities, as second and first secretary. In 2002–2004, Ichay was advisor to Foreign and Finance Minister Benjamin Netanyahu. In 2005 he became head of International Relations of the Ministry of Science and Technology, and in 2006 he was appointed his country's ambassador to the Republic of Kazakhstan, serving concurrently in Kyrgyzstan. In 2010, Ichay was appointed administrative manager to the Turkel Commission (the Public Commission to Examine the Maritime Incident of 31 May 2010) and later that year became senior deputy director general of the Prime Minister's Office. In 2012 Ichay was elected chairman of the Municipal Committee of his village in Gush Etzion and in 2019 came out third in the Likud Party primary election for the seat reserved for Israeli settlements in the West Bank. In 2016 he was appointed director general of the Ministry of Jerusalem and Heritage, and he retired from the service two years later, in January 2019. Ichay also did extensive humanitarian work; in Kazakhstan he launched Operation Dostik, to provide medical help to HIV infected infants in Chimkent county, in the south of the Republic, for which he was decorated later with the Kazakh Order of Jubilee.

In 2017 he participated in establishing and operating "Camp Ichay", initiated and launched by the American humanitarian organization "Friendships", to provide medical care for Syrian victims of the Syrian Civil War, in the Golan Heights.

In 2020 was appointed to the Association of Representatives of the Kingdom of Bunyoro-Kitara in Uganda. upon receiving the title of Knight-Commander of the Royal Order of Omukama Chwa Kaballega (hereditary).

== Books ==
In 2010 Ichay published his "Dawn at Midnight" (in Hebrew) – the history of Jews in Kazakhstan.
In 2016 he published "Thy Border's Keeper", dealing with Jewish and Israeli history.
In 2017 he edited "Israel's Right"' a government publication dealing with the legal status of the West Bank OCLC 1091791983.
