= Jeonathan Prato =

Lawyer and diplomat (1913–2006)

- יהונתן פראטו

1st Israel Ambassador to Cuba
- In office 1960–1963
- Preceded by: none
- Succeeded by: Yossef Keisari

Israel Ambassador to Costa Rica
- In office 1969–1972
- Preceded by: Chanan Olami
- Succeeded by: Walter Abeles

Israel Ambassador to Nicaragua
- In office 1969–1972
- Preceded by: Chanan Olami
- Succeeded by: Walter Abeles

Israel Ambassador to Honduras
- In office 1971–1972
- Preceded by: Eliezer Armon
- Succeeded by: Joshua Shai

Director of the Church Relations Division
- In office 1973–1978

Personal details
- Born: February 16, 1913 Florence, Italy
- Died: January 5, 2006 (aged 92) Jerusalem, Israel
- Profession: Diplomat, lawyer

Jeonathan Prato (Hebrew: יהונתן פראטו; 16 February 1913 – 5 January 2006) was a lawyer, a yishuv envoy, and an Israeli diplomat.

== Early life ==
Jeonathan Prato was born on 16 February 1913 in Florence, Italy, where his father, David Prato, was the Chief Cantor. The father went on to become Rabbi of Alexandria (1927–1936). Meanwhile, Jeonathan Prato obtained a Ph.D. in Law and made aliyah in 1936. [Prof. Rabbi David Prato became Chief Rabbi of Rome (1936–1938 and again 1945–1951) and lived in Tel Aviv in between.]

== Career ==
In Mandatory Palestine, Dr. Prato worked initially as a teacher of Italian and head of the Italian section of the British governmental Jerusalem Calling radio station. In 1940, Dr. Jeonathan Prato and his father negotiated as emissaries for the yishuv with the Italian and Vatican authorities a plan to rescue Jews from Poland through Italy. In 1941, Jeonathan Prato was named a lawyer.

=== Israeli foreign service ===
On 1 May 1949, Jeonathan Prato joined the foreign service of the young State of Israel. Initially he worked at the Israeli embassy in Italy, then in Argentina after an interlude in Israel. In 1959, Israel's foreign minister Golda Meir appointed Prato diplomatic envoy in Athens. Next, Jeonathan Prato served as the Minister to Cuba (1960-1963).

As an advisor for church relations, Prato welcomed Pope Paul VI in 1964 to Israel at the Ta'anakh Crossing. From 1969 to 1972, Prato served as Ambassador in Costa Rica and Nicaragua. During the last year, this position also included Honduras. Prato managed the Church Relations Division from 1973 until his retirement from the foreign service on 28 February 1978. In his retirement, he worked another 5 years as an archivist.

== Personal and legacy ==
In 1951, Dr. Jeonathan Prato donated historical chairs to the Bezalel National Museum (that later merged into the Israel Museum), in memory of his father.

=== The Prato Haggadah ===
Also in 1951, Prato received into his possession a famous Haggadah that was created around the year 1300. This Haggadah had been the personal property of the famous Rome-based art-dealer, scholar and collector Ludwig Pollak. Pollak and his family are thought to have been murdered in the course of the deportation of the Jews of Rome to Auschwitz on October 23, 1943 or upon arrival at Auschwitz. This book had initially been promised to the father of Prato.

Jeonathand Prato sold the haggadah in 1964 to the Jewish Theological Seminary of America. It is still known as the Prato Haggadah.

=== Family and death ===
Prato was married and had one child. He died on 5 January 2006, aged 92, in Jerusalem. Prato was buried on Har HaMenuchot.
