= Zeev Shek =

Israeli diplomat and Holocaust survivor

Zeev Shek, (May 13, 1920; - October 2, 1978, Rome,), a Holocaust survivor, was an Israeli diplomat. He was also one of the founders of the Beit Theresienstadt museum, opened in 1975.

== Biography ==
According to his son Daniel, Zeev grew up in a large religious family.

Shek met his wife, Alisa Ehrmann-Shek, in Prague as part of the Zionist youth movement and both were deported to the Theresienstadt Ghetto. When his mother was sent to Auschwitz, where she was murdered in the gas chamber, he volunteered to go with her.

Hospitalized and in a coma after liberation, Zeev woke up in an American hospital, he heard English and thought he died and went to the British mandate in heaven.

He was determined to document the events in the ghetto, and before he left for Auschwitz he made sure his wife carried on his mission. They reunited after the war and emigrated to Israel in 1946. He became the personal secretary to Moshe Sharett before becoming an ambassador. While serving as Ambassador to Italy, Shek died of a heart attack in Rome in 1978, at the age of 58. Son Daniel Shek is also a diplomat. Haaretz reported Shek was one of the founders of the Israeli Foreign Ministry.

== Career ==
Before serving as Ambassador to Italy, Shek was the head of the Israeli Foreign Ministry's Western European division so he had "overseen Israel's protracted negotiations for treaty status with the European community." He also served as Ambassador to Austria and Ambassador to the UN in Vienna and the Organization for Security and Co-operation in Europe.
