= Amir Ofek =

Israeli ambassador

Personal details
- Born: Haifa, Israel
- Education: Hebrew University of Jerusalem; Tel Aviv University
- Occupation: Diplomat

Amir Ofek is the Israeli Ambassador to Costa Rica and El Salvador. He presented his credentials in Costa Rica on December 6, 2017, and on July 5, 2018, Ambassador Ofek presented his credentials El Salvador President Salvador Sánchez Cerén. As of 2019, he was appointed non-resident Ambassador to Nicaragua.

== Biography ==
Ofek was born in Haifa, the second son of a father who survived the Holocaust (from Slovakia) and a mother who fled Italy with her family during World War II, ultimately moving to Israel. Ofek has a BA in Political Science and East-Asian Studies from the Hebrew University in Jerusalem, and an MA in Political Communication from Tel Aviv University.
