= Miriam Ziv =

Israeli diplomat

Miriam Ziv (Hebrew: מרים זיו) was the first female ambassador of Israel to Canada, from 2003 until 2008. Other firsts in her career include being the first deputy director general (Africa) of the Ministry of Foreign Affairs. Later, she served as Deputy Director General for Strategic Affairs at the Ministry.

She was listed as one of the 25 most influential people in Canadian politics by Maclean’s.

Ziv studied English linguistics and political science at Tel Aviv University.
