= List of ambassadors of Israel to Nicaragua =

The Ambassador from Israel to Nicaragua is Israel's foremost diplomatic representative in Nicaragua.

== List of ambassadors ==
- Amir Ofek (Non-Resident, San José) 2019 -
- Chanan Olami (Non-Resident, San Jose) 1976 - 1979
- Jeonathan Prato (Non-Resident, San Jose) 1969 - 1972
- Walter Abeles (Non-Resident, San Jose) 1966 - 1969
- Joshua Nissim Shai (Non-Resident, Guatemala City) 1959 - 1964
- Minister David Shaltiel (Non-Resident, Mexico City) 1956 - 1959
- Minister Yossef Keisari (Non-Resident, Mexico City) 1954 - 1956
