= Eliezer Yotvat =

Israeli diplomat (1931–2012)

- אליעזר יטבת

1st Israeli Ambassador to Azerbaijan
- In office 1994–1997
- President: Ezer Weizman
- Preceded by: Office established
- Succeeded by: Arkady Milman

Personal details
- Born: 1931
- Died: 2012 (aged 80–81)

Eliezer Yotvat (Hebrew: אליעזר יטבת; 1931-2012) was the first Israeli Ambassador to Azerbaijan from 1993 until 1996.
