= George Deek =

Arab-Israeli diplomat (born c. 1984)

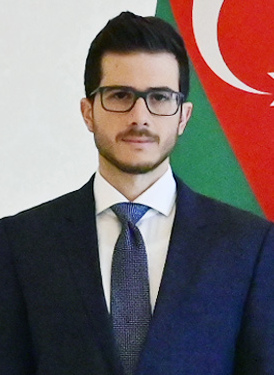
- Deek, at the reception of his credentials by the President of Azerbaijan

8th Israel Ambassador to Azerbaijan
- In office 2019–2025
- Preceded by: Dan Stav

Personal details
- Born: c. 1984 (age 41–42) Jaffa, Israel
- Education: Radzyner Law School, Herzliya, Georgetown University Law Center
- Profession: Diplomat

George Deek (Hebrew: ג'ורג' דיק, Arabic: جورج ديك; born c. 1984) is an Israeli diplomat who currently serves as the special envoy of Israel to the Christian world. In 2018, Deek was appointed Israeli ambassador to Azerbaijan. He is the first Israeli Arab Christian to become an ambassador.

== Childhood, education, and family background ==
Deek grew up in an Eastern Orthodox Christian family in the Ajami neighborhood of Jaffa, in a building where the other tenants included Muslims, Catholics, Jews and a Catholic priest of Jewish ancestry. His father, who worked as a tax advisor, was one of the leaders of the Christian community in Jaffa who served as chairman of the Orthodox Association, and was considered a well-known and popular figure in the city; in 2015 a square was inaugurated in his memory in Jaffa in the presence of Mayor Ron Huldai. According to Deek, his grandparents fled to Lebanon for safety during the 1947–1949 Palestine war, having been told that the Jews would slaughter them if they remained in their homes, but expecting to return home once Arab armies defeated the Jews. According to Deek, when the war ended, his grandparents felt that they had been "deceived", and decided to return illegally to their home in Jaffa rather than remaining in Lebanon as refugees. Since reentering the country was illegal, Deek's grandfather, an electrician, was arrested and jailed but Jewish friends and co-workers got him released. Deek's relatives who also fled in 1947 but did not return now live scattered around the world.

Deek has stated that he is of Armenian heritage through his father's side; his paternal great-grandmother was a survivor of the Armenian Genocide.

Deek earned an LLB from Radzyner Law School at IDC Herzliya in 2006. He then studied at the Georgetown University Law Center on a Fulbright Fellowship, specializing in diplomacy and international law. He worked as an attorney in Tel Aviv specializing in international law before joining the Israeli foreign service.

== Career ==
Deek joined the Ministry of Foreign Affairs in 2008. He was deputy chief of mission to Nigeria from 2009 to 2012. Deek was posted to Oslo in Norway from 2012 to 2015 where he served as deputy ambassador; he was the acting ambassador during the 2014 Israel–Gaza conflict.

In 2018, at age 34, Deek was appointed ambassador to Azerbaijan. Deek is the first Israeli Arab Christian to hold ambassadorial rank.

On 23 April 2026, Deek was appointed as the special envoy of Israel to the Christian world, a new position created amidst deteriorating relations with the Christian community.
