= Iddo Moed =

Israeli diplomat

- עדו מועד
- President: Isaac Herzog
- Prime Minister: Benjamin Netanyahu
- Preceded by: Ronen Hoffman

Iddo Moed (Hebrew: עדו מועד) is an Israeli diplomat and the ambassador of Israel to Canada. He was previously a division head in the Africa Department of the Israeli Ministry of Foreign Affairs.

== Early life ==
Moed was born in Amsterdam, the Netherlands, and joined the Israeli Diplomatic Corps in 1992.

== Career ==
During his diplomatic career, Moed was posted in countries such as the Netherlands, Dominican Republic, Singapore, and China. He was assistant to the director general, water and multilateral affairs at the Middle East Division, Middle Eastern Economic Affairs.

In June 2013, he was appointed as cyber security coordinator at the Strategic Affairs Department, MFA. where he established the Cyber Security Department at the Ministry of Foreign Affairs.

In 2014–2015 he represented Israel in the 2014–2015 UN Group of Governmental Experts on Developments in the Field of Information and Telecommunications in the Context of International Security.

In 2021 he was appointed as head of bureau, African Affairs Division.

In March 2024, he criticized a proposal for the Canadian government to recognize a Palestinian State.

During the 2025 Israeli military operation in the West Bank, a group of Arab, Asian, European, and Canadian diplomats were fired upon. In an interview with CBC News he claimed that the diplomats may have been "led astray." In an interview with Global News, he stated that Canada–Israel relations were in a "new atmosphere."
