= Consulate General of Israel to the Pacific Northwest Region =

Consular representation of the State of Israel to the United States

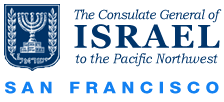
- Logo of the Consulate General of Israel to the Pacific Northwest Region
- Location: San Francisco, California,
- Address: 456 Montgomery Street Suite #2100
- Coordinates: 37°47′37″N 122°24′10″W
- Consul General: Shlomi Kofman

The Consulate General of Israel to the Pacific Northwest Region (Hebrew: הקונסוליה הכללית של ישראל בסן-פרנסיסקו), is one of Israel's diplomatic missions abroad, located at 456 Montgomery Street Suite #2100 in San Francisco, California, United States of America in the Financial District.

The Consulate General of Israel to the Pacific Northwest region is responsible for the states of Alaska, Northern California, Idaho, Montana, Oregon and Washington.

== List of Israel Consuls General ==
- Shlomi Kofman 2016–Present
- Dr. Andy David 2012–2017
- Akiva Tor 2008–2012
- David Akov 2004–2008
- Yosef Amrani 2000–2004
- Daniel Shek 1997–2000

== Israel Deputy Consuls General ==
- Matan Zamir 2019–Present
- Ravit Baer 2015–2019
- Eyal Naor 2013–2015
- Gideon Lustig 2009–2013
- Ismail Khaldi (First Bedouin Israeli Diplomat) 2006–2009
- Omer Caspi 2002–2006
- Gil Lainer 2000–2002

== History ==
- Israeli Innovations at the Exploratorium – On Tuesday, June 18, 2013, the Moving Toys Workshop exhibit was at the Exploratorium in San Francisco.
- Israel-China Cultural Festival – The first Israel-China Cultural Festival was held for one month in June 2012 in the San Francisco Bay Area.
- SFJazz Presents: Israeli Jazzfest – From Saturday April 28 to Sunday, April 29, 2012, three Israeli Jazz performances took place at the San Francisco Jewish Community Center.
- Israeli President in Bay Area – In March 2012, President of Israel Shimon Peres made a historic visit to the San Francisco Bay Area.
- Israeli Consulate's tribute to Black History Month – A month long events during Black History Month in February 2011.
- Out In Israel – April 2010 celebrated Israeli LGBT Cultural in the San Francisco Bay Area. Events dotted the month and included films, meals, and performances.

== Northwest Region sister cities ==
- Ashkelon-Sacramento
- Ashkelon-Portland
- Beer Sheva-Seattle
- Haifa-San Francisco

== See also ==
- List of diplomatic missions in San Francisco
- List of diplomatic missions of Israel
- List of Israeli twin towns and sister cities
- Israel–United States relations
