= List of ambassadors of Israel to Eswatini =

== List of ambassadors ==
- Lior Keinan (Non-Resident, Pretoria) 2017 -
- Arthur Lenk (Non-Resident, Pretoria) 2013 - 2017
- Shlomo Dayan 1985 - 1990
- Meir Joffe 1983 - 1985
- Emmanuel Galbar 1980 - 1983
- Emmanuel Ron 1979 - 1980
- Meir Gavish 1976 - 1979
- Pinchas Gonen 1972 - 1976
- Mordechai Palzur (charge d'affaires, Non-Resident, Pretoria)
- Azriel Harel 1966 - 1968
