= Daniel Shek =

Israeli diplomat

Daniel Shek (Hebrew: דניאל שק; born 16 June 1955) is a former Israeli diplomat who served as ambassador to France (September 2006-December 2010) and Consulate General to the Pacific Northwest of the US based in San Francisco. He is a member of the Kadima party.

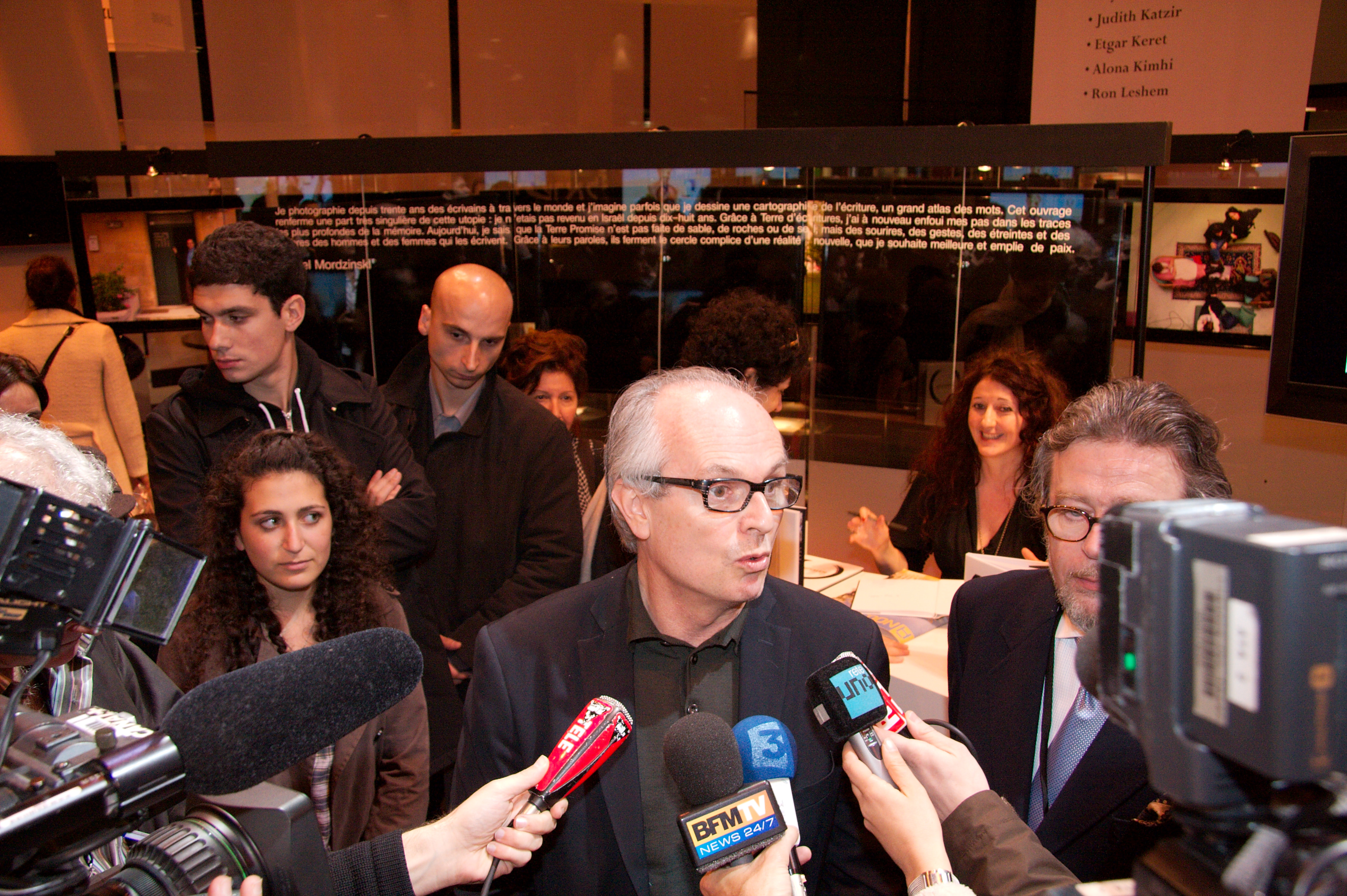
Press conference with Israeli ambassador, Dany Shek, and Jean-Daniel Compain, in Paris after the bomb threat at Salon du livre 2008 (Paris, France).

== Biography ==
Shek was born in Jerusalem on June 16, 1955, to Zeev Shek, an ambassador, and Alisa Ehrmann-Shek, an artist. He attended Hebrew University of Jerusalem, studying general history and French literature, after serving in the military.

At Mitvim, he is a member of the board of directors. Shek was also managing director at BICOM (Britain Israel Communications and Research Centre).

== Personal life ==
When he graduated, he married his girlfriend Marie who was born in Tunisia. Shek is now married to Emilie Moatti, a former member of the Knesset for the Labor Party he met while Ambassador.
