= Emilie Moatti =

Israeli activist and media woman (born 1980)

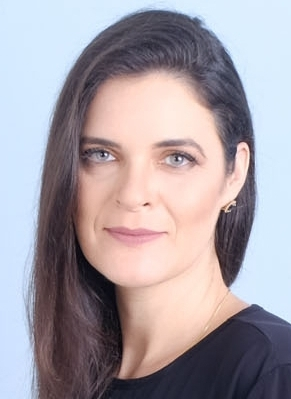
- Moatti in 2018

Faction represented in the Knesset
- 2021–2022: Israeli Labor Party

Personal details
- Born: 27 June 1980 (age 46) Kfar Saba, Israel

Emilie Haya Moatti (Hebrew: אֵמִילִי חַיָּה מוּאָטִי; born 27 June 1980) is an Israeli activist, filmmaker, writer and politician. She was a member of the Knesset for the Labor Party from 2021 to 2022.

== Early life and education ==
Moatti was born in Kfar Saba on 27 June 1980, the oldest of six children in a religious family of Tunisian-Jewish descent. She dropped out of high school at the end of tenth grade and began working. At 18 she moved to Tel Aviv, where she worked odd jobs while completing her matriculation exams at the Kibbutzim College. She holds a bachelor's degree in social sciences and humanities from the Open University of Israel. In 2003 she began studying at the University of Paris.

== Career ==
While in Paris she worked as a producer and became a spokeswoman for the Israeli Cinema Festival. She subsequently worked as a filmmaker and political commentator, writing for Haaretz.

Moatti ran a small public relations firm whose clients included Tzipi Livni's Hatnua party. She was media adviser to Reuven Rivlin in his campaign for the 2014 presidential election. In 2016 she co-hosted the daily Reshet Bet radio show Shnayim BeShtayim with Yehoshua Mor-Yosef.

She became involved in peace activism, serving as a director the Geneva Initiative. In 2014 she joined the board of WePower, a feminist group. In 2018 she won the Ministry of Education First Book Prize for her novel Blue Marks.

=== Knesset tenure ===
A member of the Labor Party, Moatti was placed fifteenth on the joint list of Labor, Meretz and Gesher for the 2020 Knesset elections, but the alliance won only seven seats. Prior to the 2021 elections she was placed third on the Labor Party list, and was elected to the Knesset as the party won seven seats.

During the constructive vote of no confidence to remove the Netanyahu government and install the Bennett-Lapid "change" coalition, Moatti's vote was crucial. She was unable to stand as a result of a spinal infection and had to be rushed back from hospital on a stretcher to cast her vote for the new government, which was ultimately installed by a 60–59 vote.

In 2021 Moatti became head of the Knesset Foreign Affairs and Defense Committee’s Subcommittee on Foreign Policy and Public Diplomacy. For the 2022 elections, Moatti was placed sixth on the Labor list, and lost her seat as the party won only four seats.

In the Democrats primary elections held ahead of the 2026 Knesset elections, Moatti came in at number fourteen on the slate.

== Personal life ==
She is married to former ambassador Daniel Shek.
