= Eviatar Manor =

Israeli diplomat

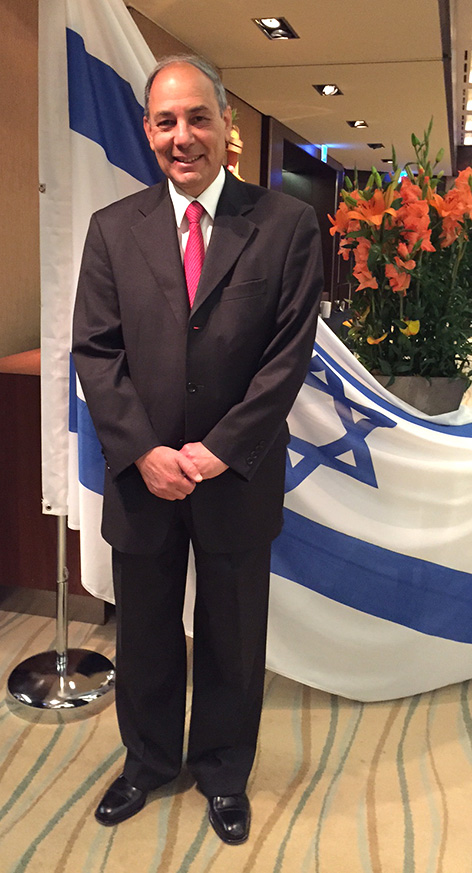

Ambassador of Israel to the United Nations and Other International Organizations in Geneva
- In office 2012–2016
- Preceded by: Aharon Leshno-Yaar
- Succeeded by: Aviva Raz Shechter

Eviatar Manor (Hebrew: אביתר מנור; born 1949) is a retired Israeli diplomat. He was the Permanent Representative of Israel to the United Nations in Geneva from 2012 to 2016.

== Biography ==
Eviatar Manor was born in Tel Aviv. In 1967 he was conscripted into the Israel Defense Forces and served in the Artillery Corps. After being discharged in 1970, he studied Economics and International Relations at the Hebrew University of Jerusalem. He also holds a Diploma in the Studies of the Economics of European Integration from the College of Europe, Bruges, Belgium (cum laude).

He is married to Orly Manor, a professor. They have two sons, Oren and Ilan.

== Diplomatic career ==
Eviatar Manor joined the Israeli diplomatic service in 1973. Manor served as Deputy Director-General and Head of the UN and International Organizations Division of the Israeli Foreign Ministry in 2008-2012.

His overseas postings include the United Kingdom, the United States and Sweden, where he served as Israel's ambassador from 2004 to 2008.

== See also ==
- Israel-Sweden relations

Preceded by Zvi Mazel	Ambassador of Israel to Sweden; 2004–2008	Succeeded by Benjamin Dagan
Preceded by Aharon Leshno-Yaar	Ambassador of Israel to United Nations and Other International Organizations in Geneva; 2012–2016	Succeeded by Aviva Raz Shechter
