= List of ambassadors of Israel to Armenia =

The ambassador from Israel to Armenia was Israel's foremost diplomatic representative in Armenia.

Israel and Armenia established diplomatic relations in 1992.

== List of former ambassadors ==
- Ehud Gol (Non-Resident, Jerusalem) 2007–2008
- Yuval Fuchs 2012–2016
- Eliyahu Yerushalmi (Non-Resident, Jerusalem) 2017–2018
- Eli Belozerkowski ? – Is ambassador in 2020
