= Reda Mansour =

Israeli Druze poet, historian and diplomat

- رضا منصور
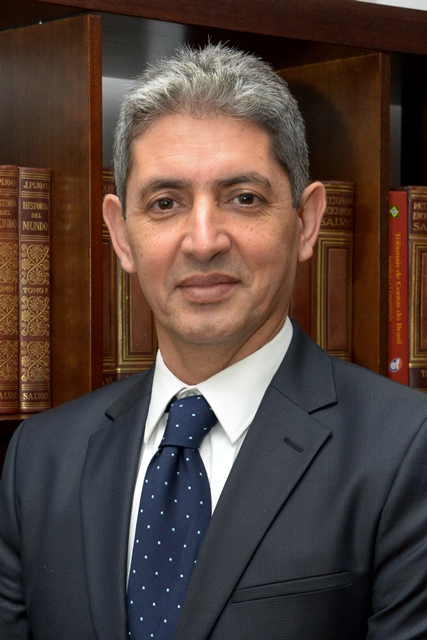

Personal details
- Born: 1965 (age 60–61) Isfiya, Israel
- Profession: Diplomat, poet, historian

Reda Mansour (Arabic: رضا منصور, Hebrew: רדא מנצור) is an Israeli Druze poet, historian and diplomat. He has published three books of Hebrew poetry and received the University of Haifa Miller Award as well as the State President Scholarship for young writers.

Mansour has a Ph.D. from the University of Haifa's Middle East History Department and a graduate of Harvard Kennedy School where he was a Wexner Israel Fellow.

He studied Spanish at Salamanca University, and a general studies semester in the Hebrew University in Jerusalem.

His field of research is the Changes in the Perception of Identity and Social Environment as Evident in the Intellectual Discourse in Syria During the Third Decade of the "Corrective Movement" 1988-2003.

== Early life ==
Reda Mansour was born in 1965 in the Druze village of Isfiya in northern Israel. He studied in Haifa between 1977–1983; first in the Leo Baeck Middle School and later in Basmat High School of the Technion (Israel’s institute of science and technology).

During that time he was involved in many youth organizations which develop cross-cultural understanding around the world, by encouraging respect for cultural difference. Among these organizations: CISV and BBYO - B'nai B'rith Youth Organization (chairman of local branch). In 1988-1989 he was also active in Habonim Dror (in British Columbia, Canada and Maryland, United States).

During the first years of his university studies in Haifa, Mansour was involved in a variety of social projects among them: Perach: Coordination of student assistance to young primary school students in two villages in the Galilee, and Bridging the Gap: Promotion of Higher education in Minority communities

== Literary career ==
Mansour is the first non-Jewish poet in Israel to write exclusively in Hebrew. His short story "Jumblat in the Negev" has won the "Recommended Story" category of the "Ha'aretz" Annual Short Story Award in 1997. In addition, a collection of his poems is currently translated to Spanish and Portuguese. He is at work on a book of short stories.

Mansour has participated in poetry readings and Poetry festivals in Isfiya, Haifa, Tel Aviv, San Francisco, New York, Los Angeles, Seattle, Miami, Houston, New Mexico, San Salvador, Quito and Lisbon.

He participated in the Charleston's historic Piccolo Spoleto festival in June 2008. He held a reading of some of his acclaimed poetic works at Charleston's City Gallery at historic Waterfront Park.

Mansour was the international visiting poet at The Meacham Writers’ Workshop of the University of Tennessee in November 2009.

=== Tender Leaves of Conscience ===
This collection of Hebrew poems was written in various places around the world starting from 1998 during the author's studies in the KSG and ending in Portugal four years later. The poems are dedicated to nature and its effect on history and people. They blend together Arab and Jewish traditions and the multiethnic history of the Iberian Peninsula with some images of the modern American literature. They explore the relationships between people and places. The title of the book is the title of one of the poems that was written during a Cambridge spring mixing with the news of the massacres in the Balkans. The collection was published by Sa'ar Publishing in 2004, and the cover design by Israeli photographer Alex Levac.

== Other books by the author ==
- The Man of Dreams (1987)
- From the Battlefields to the Land of Freedom (1991)
- UN Peacekeeping Forces (Ed) (1991)
- UN Security Council Resolution on the Middle East (Ed)(1993)
- The Silence Between the words (2008)

== Diplomacy ==
Appointed at 35 years old, Mansour was the youngest ambassador in Israel’s History. During his career in the foreign service, he served as Ambassador of Israel to Ecuador. Prior to that, he served as Deputy chief of mission in the Israeli Embassy in Portugal and as Consul in the Israeli Consulate in San Francisco. Mansour speaks five languages.

He served as the Consul General in the Israeli Consulate in Atlanta. In January 2007, the Georgia Senate passed a resolution honoring Mansour and others for efforts to promote peace and grow business, cultural, and educational ties between the U.S. and Israel. He was the Israeli Ambassador to Brazil between 2014 and 2016. He later served as the Israeli Ambassador to Panama between 2018 and 2021 and as a non-resident Ambassador to Barbados, Trinidad and Tobago Guyana, Suriname and CARICOM.

We Who Shape Nations: Diplomacy in the Modern Age

Mansour's book, published in 2023, discusses diplomacy and the careers of individuals in international relations.

== Civic activities ==
Mansour has devoted his public activities in Israel for the promotion of dialogue between Arabs and Jews. In this realm, he has served on the board of several NGO's and taken part in many projects aimed at promoting of co-existence and cultural dialogue.

He has served on the board of many civic organizations:

Jewish Healthcare International - Provide Humanitarian Aid Worldwide. International Organizations, Member of the board, Atlanta – Georgia.

The U.S. – Israel Chamber of commerce - Non-Governmental Organization. Member of the board. Atlanta - Georgia.

Georgia International Law Enforcement Exchange - Non-Governmental Organization Member of the board, Atlanta – Georgia.

Ecuador – Israel cultural Institute - Civic Association, Member of the board. Quito – Ecuador.

The Shalom (Peace) Club - Civic Association, Member of the board. Quito – Ecuador.

Omanut Laam - for the promotion of culture and art in small communities. Non-Governmental Organization, Member of the board, Israel.

San Francisco Amuta - support to educational activities in the North of Israel. Non-Governmental Organization, Member of the board. Israel.

Morehouse College - Member of the Martin Luther King Jr. international Board of sponsors - Atlanta

Reda Mansour courted moderate Muslim leaders in Europe to counteract the sway of Islamists hostile to the state of Israel (2005–2006). Mansour aimed at finding the silent voice—to give it a means of speaking out so that it will condemn terror, condemn anti-Semitism, and connect with the local Jewish communities for the sake of joint civil actions.

== Awards, prizes, and fellowships ==
- Haaretz Annual Prize, recommended short story.
- Hero of International Trade, World Chambers of Commerce – Atlanta
- MLK board of advisers, Morehouse College, Atlanta
- Miller Prize of Haifa University, for the poetry book Images of a Bridge
- Amos Prize of the president of Israel to writers.
- Dean Achievement List - University of Haifa
- The Wexner Foundation – Wexner Israel Fellow – Harvard University
- Georgia Senate Resolution - Honored for efforts to promote peace and grow business, cultural and educational ties between the U.S. and Israel
- Honorary Tennessean – By Governor Phil Bredesen

== Humanitarian aid and peace-building operations ==
=== Tungurahua relief ===
Tungurahua, a volcano located in the Cordillera Central of the Andes of central Ecuador, 140 km (87 mi) south of the capital Quito, erupted in 2002 and a major ash out-fall covered the entire region including the capital city. Mansour organized a relief effort that included the delivery of medical equipment and aid to small communities.

=== Stabilization of the Ecuadorian north border ===
Following the establishment of ODENOR the Ecuadorian Authority for stabilization of the border areas with Colombia (2003), Mansour facilitated the participation of Israel in the International donor countries conference in Brussels. Later he led two projects in that region that provided clean drinking water.

=== Battling Desertification in southern Ecuador ===
As part of the efforts to battle desertification in southern Ecuador and foster the Ecuador – Peru peace agreement, Mansour invited Israeli scientists to this region. The scientists from the Ben-Gurion University in the Negev offered assessment and evaluated possible remedies. The university also invited Ecuadorian students to study in its International School for Desert Studies

== Articles by the author ==
- Israel sets an example of freedom, tolerance
- "The Lebanon-Israel tragedy and Hope". The Charlotte Observer.
- Integration Is Israeli Arabs’ Only Path To Equality
- Israel wants peace, political moderation
- Gaza: A 40-Year Struggle to Maintain Hope
- Green: taking humanity to the next level

== See also ==
- List of Israeli Druze

== Poems ==
- Carmel (English)
- I Am The Man of Dreams
- Nomads (Spanish)
