= List of ambassadors of Israel to Honduras =

== List of ambassadors ==
- Nadav Goren 2024 - Present
- Eldad Golan Rosenberg 2021-2023
- Shimon Agur 1990 - 1995
- Shlomo Cohen 1986 - 1990
- Eliezer Armon (Non-Resident, Guatemala City) 1977 - 1981
- Jeonathan Prato (Non-Resident, San Jose) 1971 - 1972
- Joshua Nissim Shai (Non-Resident, Guatemala City) 1959 - 1964
- Minister David Shaltiel (Non-Resident, Mexico City) 1956 - 1959
- Minister Yossef Keisari (Non-Resident, Mexico City) 1954 - 1956
