= Israel Eliashiv =

Israeli diplomat (born 1931)

- ישראל אלישיב
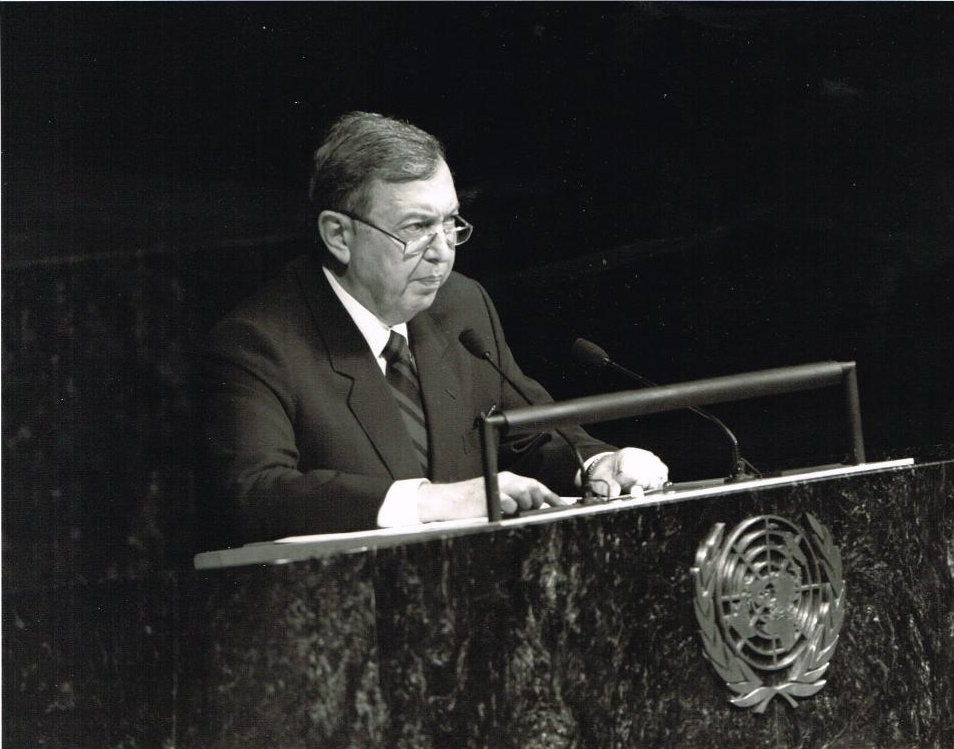
- Israel Eliashiv at The United Nations

Ambassador of Israel to Singapore
- In office 1987–1990

Permanent Representative of Israel to the United Nations in New York
- In office 1993–1996

Ambassador Extraordinary and Plenipotentiary to the Conference on Disarmament and the Convention on Chemical Weapons
- In office 1990–1991

Personal details
- Born: 1931 (age 94–95) Romania
- Children: 3
- Education: Tel Aviv School of Law and Economics; Hebrew University of Jerusalem (LLB); Sapienza University of Rome (PhD)

Israel Eliashiv (Hebrew: ישראל אלישיב, Yisra'el, born 1931) is an Israeli diplomat who served as the country's ambassador to Singapore between 1987 and 1990.

== Biography ==
Eliashiv was born in Romania in 1931 and immigrated with his family to Mandatory Palestine in 1935. He attended the Tel Aviv School of Law and Economics (which later became part of Tel Aviv University) before studying law at the Hebrew University of Jerusalem. He later received a PhD from the Sapienza University of Rome.

He held different diplomatic positions in Rome Italy, Canberra Australia, Singapore, Geneva Switzerland, and New York USA. He was one of the two first Israeli diplomats who established Israel's first embassy in Singapore in 1968. He later returned to Singapore in 1987 as an Ambassador of Israel, holding the post until 1990.

He has been involved extensively in multilateral activities throughout his diplomatic career, including his position as Director of International Economic Organizations Division in the Ministry of Foreign Affairs. He represented Israel in numerous economic, environmental and development activities in the United Nations and its Organizations as well as in various international conferences. He participated as member of the Israeli delegations to the General Assembly, representing Israel in the Second Committee (Economic and Financial) and the Fifth Committee (Administrative and Budgetary).

Between 1977 and 1982 he served as Minister-Counsellor, Deputy Permanent Representative to the United Nations in Geneva and Permanent Representative to GATT and UNCTAD. During that period he was engaged in trade negotiations with many countries within the framework of "Tokyo Round" of multilateral trade negotiations, represented Israel as Observer in the sessions of ECE (Economic Commission of Europe), ESOSOC, the Commission on Sustainable Development, and many international conferences such as; International Code of Conduct on Transfer of Technology, Negotiating Conference on a Common Fund under the Integrated Programme for Commodities, The Diplomatic Conference on the revision of the Paris Convention for Protection of Industrial Property.

Between 1990 and 1991 he served as Ambassador Extraordinary and Plenipotentiary to the Conference on Disarmament and the Convention on Chemical Weapons, Geneva, Switzerland.

Between 1993 and 1996 he served as Ambassador, Permanent Mission of Israel to the United Nations in New York. During these years, Eliashiv initiated and concluded two agreements between UN agencies and Israel. The first was in 1995 with the Department for Development Management Services (DDSMS); the second was in 1996 with the UNDP, with the purpose of enhancing and expanding economic cooperation in global and regional activities. He also initiated and organized the International Symposium on Sustainable Water Management in Arid and Semi-Arid Regions which was held in Israel in May 1995, and opened by Shimon Peres. The symposium was co-sponsored by Israel, Japan, UNDP and the International Consortium of Arid Lands and enjoyed the participation of experts from more than 30 countries. He also initiated the International Expert Meeting on Synergies Among Conventions on Climate Change, Biological Diversity Desertification and Forest Principles, which was held in Sde Boker in March 1996.

He is currently a senior adviser to the Jacob Blaustein Institutes for Desert Research at Ben-Gurion University of the Negev, and member of the Local Organization Committee of the International Conference on Drylands, Deserts & Desertification, since 2006, a biennial event (next event in 2022), and Special Adviser to the Organizing Committee.

He now lives with his wife in Tel-Aviv, has 3 children and 8 grandchildren.
