= List of ambassadors of Israel to Kyrgyzstan =

Israel's diplomatic representatives to Kyrgyzstan, listed here, included a chargé d'affaires and non-resident ambassadors based in Almaty, Astana, or both.

== List of ambassadors ==
- Chargé d'Affaires a.i. Arkady Milman (Non-Resident, Almaty) 1992–1993
- Bentsion Karmel (Non-Resident, Almaty) 1993–1996
- Israel Mey Ami (Non-Resident, Almaty) 1996–2002
- Moshe Kimhi (Non-Resident, Almaty) 2002–2004
- Michael Lotem (Non-Resident, Almaty) 2004–2006
- Ran Ichay (Non-Resident, Almaty & Astana) 2006–2008
- Israel Mey Ami (Non-Resident, Astana) 2008–2012
- Eliyaho Tasman (Non-Resident, Astana) 2012–2015
- Michael Brodsky (Non-Resident, Astana) 2015–2018
- Liat Wexelman (Non-Resident, Astana) 2018–2022
