= Adi Cohen-Hazanov =

Israeli diplomat

- עדי כהן-חזנוב

Chargé d'affaires of Israel in South Africa
- In office August 2022 – August 2025
- Preceded by: Eliav Belotserkovskiy
- Succeeded by: Ariel Seidman

Adi Cohen-Hazanov is an Israeli diplomat, and the country's former chargé d'affaires to South Africa.
