= List of ambassadors of Israel to the Republic of Congo =

== List of ambassadors ==
- Yoram Elron 2012 - 2015, 2000 - 2003
- Yerachmiel Ram Yaron 1960 - 1964
