= Merav Zafary-Odiz =

Israeli diplomat

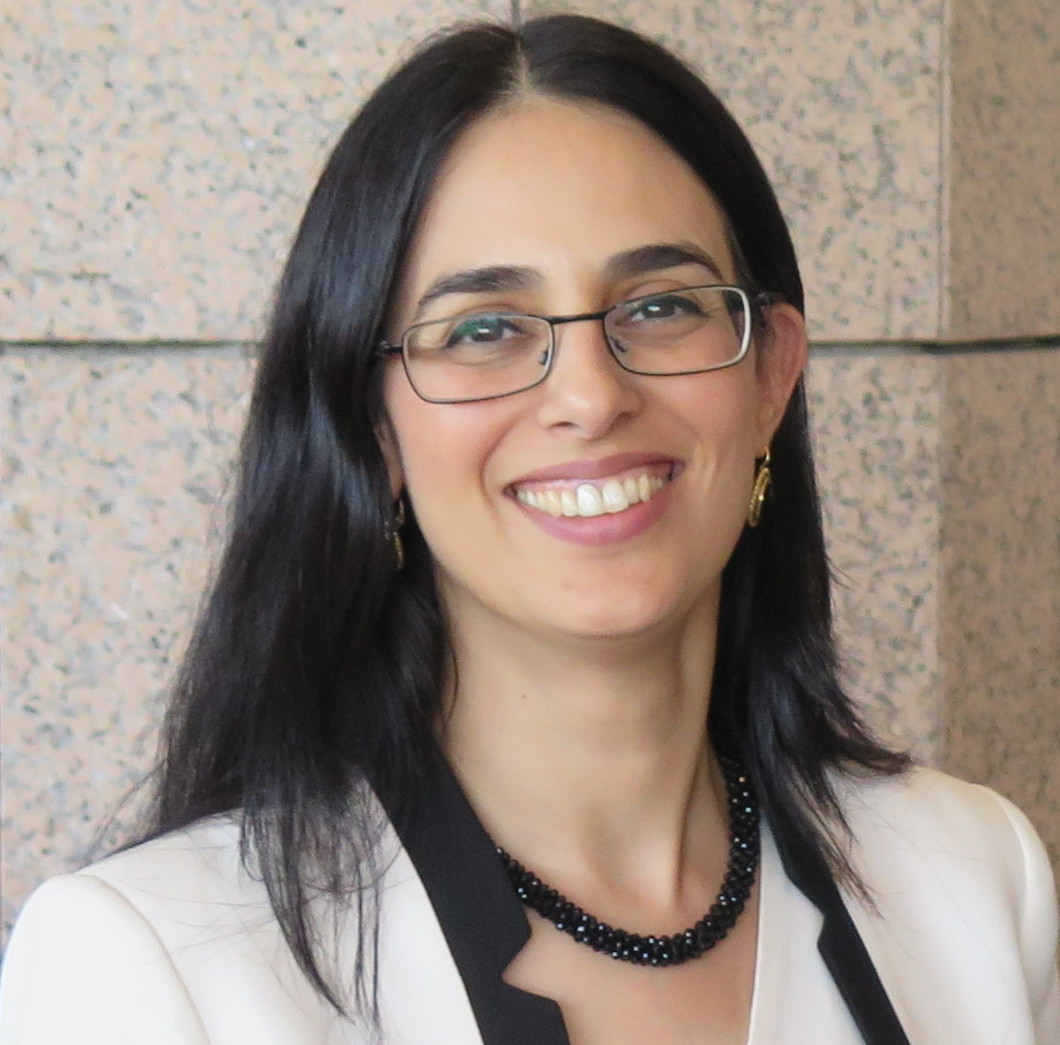

Merav Zafary-Odiz (Hebrew: מירב זפרי-אודיז) is Israel's Permanent Representative to the International Atomic Energy Agency (IAEA) and the Preparatory Commission for the Comprehensive Nuclear-Test-Ban Treaty Organization (CTBTO PrepCom) in Vienna.

Zafary-Odiz earned a Master of Public Policy (MPP) from the Goldman School of Public Policy at the University of California, Berkeley and a BA in International Relations & Political Science from the Hebrew University of Jerusalem.

== Publications ==
- Zafary-Odiz M. (2018) The Israeli National Perspective on Nuclear Non-proliferation. In: Maiani L., Abousahl S., Plastino W. (eds) International Cooperation for Enhancing Nuclear Safety, Security, Safeguards and Non-proliferation–60 Years of IAEA and EURATOM. Springer Proceedings in Physics, vol 206. Springer, Berlin, Heidelberg
