= List of ambassadors of Israel to South Africa =

== List of ambassadors ==
- Chargé d'Affaires a.i. Adi Cohen-Hazanov 2024 - present
- Eliav Belotsercovsky 2022 - 2023
- Lior Keinan 2017 - 2018
- Arthur Lenk 2013 - 2017
- Dov Segev-Steinberg 2008 - 2013
- Ilan Baruch (diplomat) 2005 - 2008
- Tova Herzl 2001 - 2003
- Uri Oren 1998 - 2001
- Elazar Granot 1994 - 1996
- Alon Liel 1992 - 1994
- David Ariel 1985 - 1989
- Eliyahu Lankin 1981 to 1985,
- Joseph Harmelin 1979 - 1981
- Itzhak Unna 1974 - 1975
- Chargé d'Affaires a.i. Mordechai Palzur
- Minister Eliezer Yapou 1966 - 1969
- Minister Simcha Pratt 1961 - 1963
- Minister Katriel Salmon 1959 - 1961
- Minister Itzhak Bavly 1955 - 1959
- Minister Semah Cecil Hyman 1952 - 1955
- Minister David Goitein 1950 - 1951

=== Consulate (Johannesburg) ===
- Consul General Gershon Gera 1978
- Consul General Matityahu Dagan 1975 - 1978
- Consul General Jacob Doron 1959 - 1963
- Consul General Gabriel Doron 1956 - 1959
