= List of ambassadors of Israel to Lithuania =

== List of ambassadors ==
- Yossi Avni-Levy 2019 -
- Amir Maimon 2015 - 2019
- Gary Koren 2003 - 2006
