= Ronen Hoffman =

Israeli academic and politician

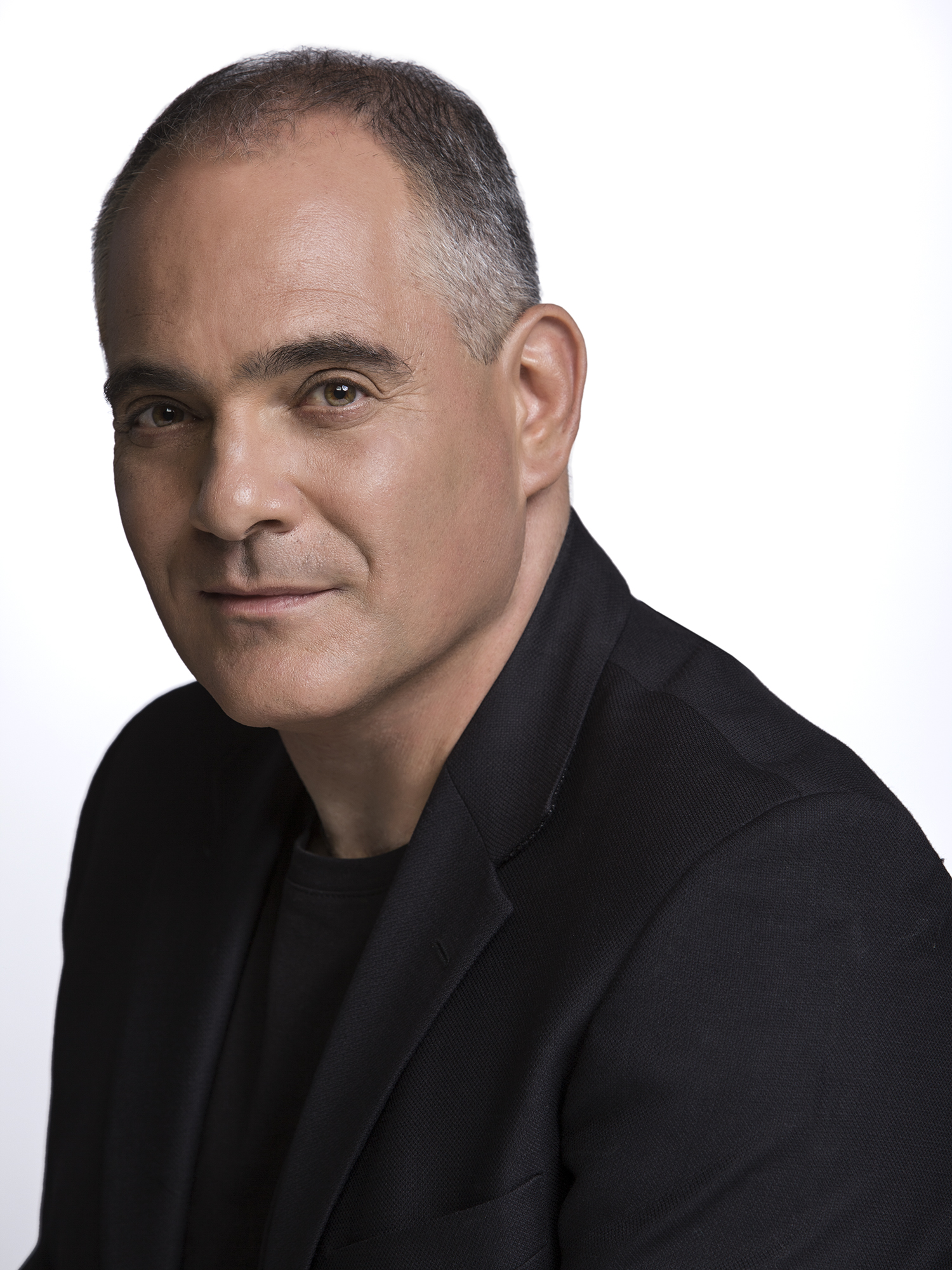
- Hoffman in 2012

Faction represented in the Knesset
- 2013–2015: Yesh Atid

Diplomatic roles
- 2021–2023: Ambassador to Canada

Personal details
- Born: 19 July 1963 (age 63) Afula, Israel

Ronen Pinchas Hoffman (Hebrew: רונן פנחס הופמן; born 19 July 1963) is an Israeli academic, politician and diplomat. He served as a member of the Knesset for Yesh Atid between 2013 and 2015 and was Ambassador to Canada from 2021 to 2023.

== Biography ==
Hoffman was born into a farming family in Afula, and grew up in the city. After his national service in the Israel Defense Forces he studied political science at Tel Aviv University. He worked as an information officer in the Israeli consulate in Atlanta and as a personal aide to Yitzhak Rabin during the 1992 elections. He was then involved in co-ordinating the Israeli delegation for peace talks with Syria between 1992 and 1994.

In 1996 Hoffman founded the International Institute for Counter-Terrorism at the Interdisciplinary Center Herzliya, and served as its CEO until the following year. In 1999 he completed his doctorate at King's College London, dealing with Syrian-Israeli Peace Negotiations from 1992 to 1995. After returning to Syrian peace negotiations under Prime Minister Ehud Barak, he then worked as a senior lecturer at the Institute focussing on governance, diplomacy, international relations and political psychology between 2001 and 2012. He also worked as a policy advisor to the Ministry of Defense during 2001.

In 2012 he joined the new Yesh Atid party and was placed nineteenth on the party's list for the 2013 Knesset elections. He entered the Knesset after the party won 19 seats, and sat on the Foreign Affairs and Defense Committee and chaired the subcommittee on Foreign Policy and Public Diplomacy. He was placed eighteenth on the Yesh Atid list for the 2015 elections, losing his seat as the party was reduced to 11 seats.

In July 2021 Hoffman was appointed Ambassador to Canada. He took up the role in December 2021.

On 21 January 2023 Hoffman announced his resignation as ambassador to Canada because his "personal and professional integrity has compelled [him] to request to shorten [his] post and return to Israel this summer," and that his opposition to the Netanyahu government made it impossible for him to continue in his position.

Hoffman lives in Ottawa with his partner, Michal Arad. He is divorced and has three children.
