= Michael Simon (diplomat) =

Israeli diplomat

Dr. Michael Simon
- מייקל סיימון
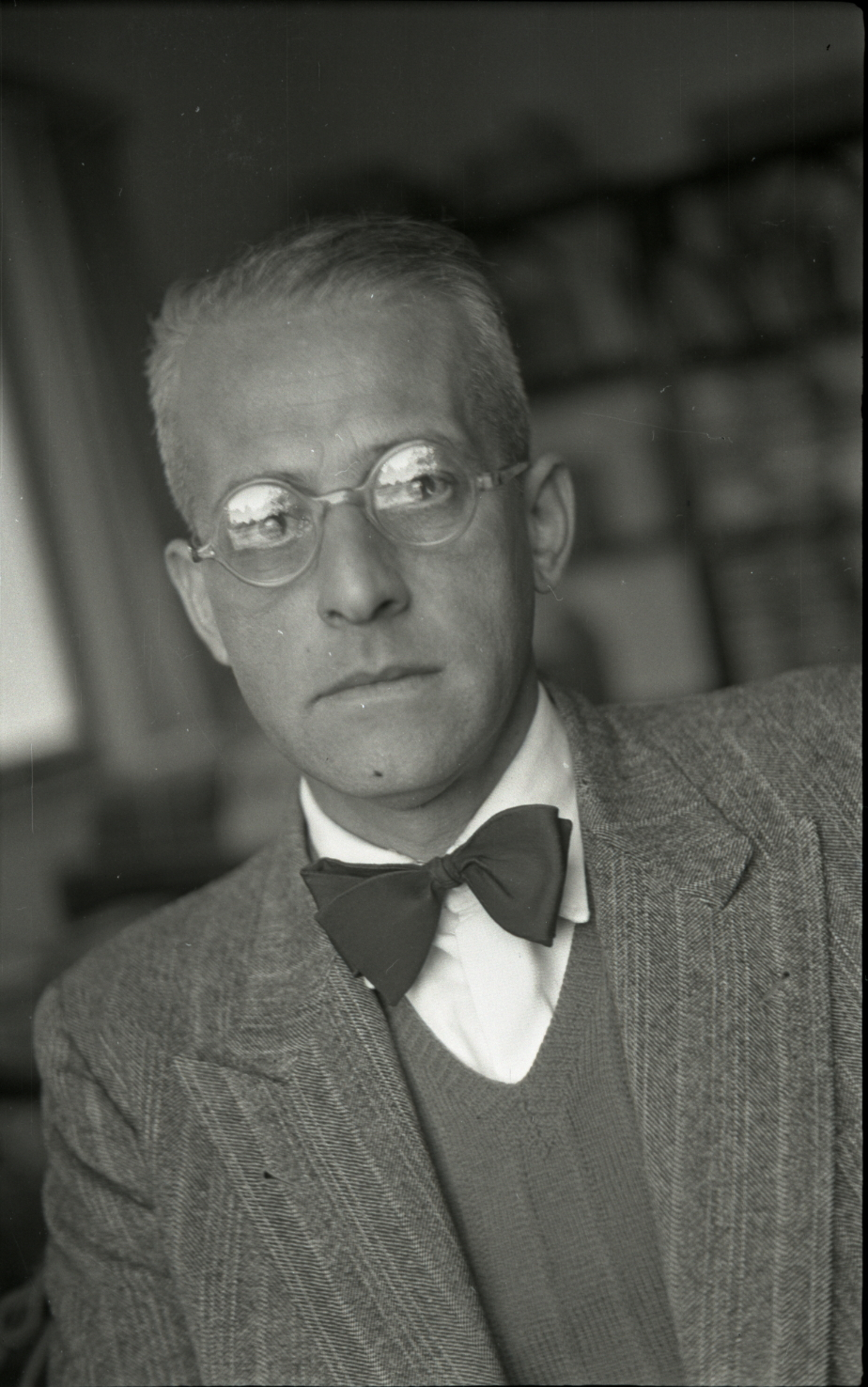
- In office 1960–1967

Personal details
- Born: 1901 Berlin, Germany
- Died: 1976 (aged 74–75)
- Occupation: Diplomat
- Known for: Israeli Ambassador to Peru and Austria

Dr. Michael Simon (Hebrew: מייקל סיימון; 1901–1976) was an Israeli diplomat who served as Ambassador to Peru and Minister to Bolivia (1960-1963); Austria (1963–1967) (at the same time, he was Ambassador to the United Nations & the OSCE in Vienna and was Consul General to Montreal from 1957 until 1960.

== Biography ==
Simon was born in Berlin, settling in Palestine in 1924. From 1948 until 1957, he was the head of the Protocol Division at the Ministry of Foreign Affairs.
