= Ahuva Spieler =

Israeli diplomat

Ahuva Spieler (Hebrew: אהובה שפילר; born 1973, in Moldova) is an Israeli diplomat who is the Consul General in Hong Kong SAR and Macao SAR since August 2017. Spieler is the first female consul to represent Israel in Hong Kong, replacing Sagi Karni.

Spieler earned a B.A. in Far Eastern Studies (China) and International Relations, at the Hebrew University, Jerusalem, in 1997.
