= Galit Baram =

Israeli consul (born 1969)

- גלית ברעם
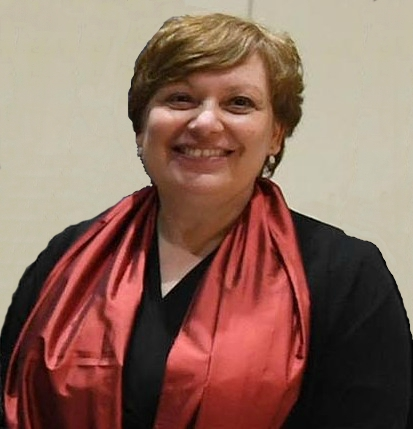
- Galit Baram Amdur, January 2018

Israeli Consul General in Toronto
- Incumbent
- Assumed office August 2016

Personal details
- Born: 1969 (age 56–57) Jerusalem, Israel
- Spouse: Nissan Amdur
- Education: Tel Aviv University (BA in Archaeology and English), Hebrew University of Jerusalem (MA in American Studies)
- Occupation: Diplomat

Galit Baram (Hebrew: גלית ברעם, also גלית ברעם-אמדור, Galit Baram-Amdur; born 1969, Jerusalem, is an Israeli career diplomat, currently serving as Director of the Department for U.S.-Israel Political Relations, at the North America Division, Israel Ministry of Foreign Affairs. She served as Israeli Consul General in Toronto and Western Canada from 2016 to 2021.

Her previous assignments include Moscow, Cairo and Washington DC. She was also Director of the Department for Palestinian Affairs and Regional Cooperation at the Ministry of Foreign Affairs. Galit Baram earned a bachelor's degree in Archaeology of the Near East and English from Tel Aviv University and a master's degree in American Studies from the Hebrew University of Jerusalem. She is married to Israeli diplomat Nissan Amdur.
