= Arthur Lenk =

Israeli diplomat

- ארתור לנק
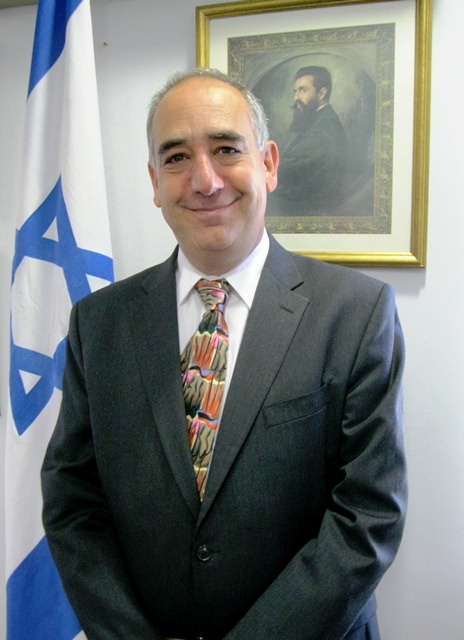

3rd Israeli Ambassador to South Africa
- In office October 16, 2013 – June 2017
- President: Shimon Peres; Reuven Rivlin
- Preceded by: Dov Segev-Steinberg
- Succeeded by: Lior Keinan

4th Israeli Ambassador to Azerbaijan
- In office September 13, 2005 – June 29, 2009
- President: Moshe Katsav; Dalia Itzik (Acting); Shimon Peres
- Preceded by: Eitan Naeh
- Succeeded by: Michael Lavon-Lotem

Personal details
- Born: 1964 (age 61–62) (United States) Paterson, New Jersey, U.S.

Arthur Lenk (Hebrew: ארתור לנק; born 1964), is an Israeli diplomat who served as Israel's ambassador to South Africa, Lesotho and Swaziland from August 2013 to July 2017. He served as the fourth ambassador of the State of Israel to the Republic of Azerbaijan from August 2005 to July 2009. He then served as director of the Department of International Law in the Office of the Legal Adviser of Israel's Ministry of Foreign Affairs.

== Biography ==
Arthur Lenk was born to a Jewish-American family in Paterson, New Jersey, and attended the Frisch School in Paramus. He made Aliyah, emigrating to Israel in 1983.

Lenk served as a medic in the Israel Defense Forces and first aid instructor at the IDF's officer training school between 1984 and 1986. Lenk then studied law at the Hebrew University of Jerusalem, gaining an LL.B. in 1990, and an LL.M. in International Law in 2003. In 1991, he became a member of the Israeli Bar, and was admitted to the New York Bar in 1992. He then began working as a lawyer in Jerusalem. Between 1992 and 1996, Lenk served as chairman of the Israel Softball Association. He was named to the organization's Hall of Fame in July 2005.

Lenk is married to Ruth and they have three daughters: Margalit, Ilana and Aiden.

== Career ==
Lenk joined the Israel Ministry of Foreign Affairs as a foreign service cadet and participated in the Foreign Officer Training Program in 1994. In 1996, he was sent to the Israeli Embassy in New Delhi, India, where he served as Second Secretary for Cultural and Academic Affairs. In 1998, he transferred to the Consulate General of Israel to the Southwestern United States, Los Angeles, where he served as Consul for Communications and Public Affairs until 2000.

Following this post, Lenk worked as an attorney in the Office of the Legal Adviser at the Ministry of Foreign Affairs in Jerusalem. In 2000–01 Lenk took part in Israel's interaction with the Sharm el-Sheikh Fact-Finding Committee ("The Mitchell Committee"), which examined reasons for the start of violence in the region beginning in the autumn of 2000. His primary responsibility was giving legal advice on United Nations related issues. He also acted as Israel's representative to the United Nations General Assembly's Legal Committee in 2001 and 2004. Furthermore, Lenk worked as part of the Israel Government's legal team on Israel's position regarding the Israel barrier case before the International Court of Justice in 2003 and 2004.

Lenk was awarded an "outstanding diplomat" citation by Ministry of Foreign Affairs for his role within a group that coordinated Israel's initiative for the January 2005 United Nations Special Session commemorating the Sixtieth Anniversary of the freeing of Europe's Concentration Camps.

Between 2002 and 2005 Lenk also served as an Israeli Government spokesman and a lecturer on foreign affairs and diplomacy, briefing and appearing on a range of international media sources including CNN, BBC, Le Monde and NPR. In the fall semester of 2003, he also taught a graduate seminar in Foreign Policy, International Law and the Arab-Israel Conflict at the Herzog Center for Middle East Studies and Diplomacy, Ben Gurion University of the Negev, in Beersheba.

Lenk was appointed as Israel's fourth ambassador to Azerbaijan by the Israeli Government on 3 April 2005. He submitted his credentials to the President of Azerbaijan Ilham Aliyev on 13 September 2005.

Lenk's tenure in Azerbaijan has coincided with a significant development of the relations between the two countries. A number of key visits took place highlighted by the historic visit of President Shimon Peres to Baku on 28–29 June 2009. Peres led a delegation that included three ministers and a large business delegation. Other visits to Baku were those of Israel's Minister of Agriculture Shalom Simhon in May 2008, Deputy Prime Minister Avigdor Lieberman in August 2007 and two visits of the Minister of National Infrastructures Binyamin Ben-Eliezer in June 2006 and June 2008 and visits of Azerbaijan's Ministers of Economic Development (February 2007), Emergency Situations (March 2007), Transportation (June 2007) and Ecology and Natural Resources (October 2007) to Israel. Additionally, an association of Azerbaijani immigrants to Israel, AZIS, was formed in April 2007, to serve as a bridge between the societies and promote relations. Trade ties also dramatically grew with Israel significantly increasing its energy purchases from Azerbaijan and developing investment and exports in a number of sectors including agriculture, infrastructure and telecommunications. According to figures published by Israel's Central Bureau of Statistics, Israeli exports to Azerbaijan grew by nearly 5000 percent during Lenk's tenure as ambassador.

Year	2005	2006	2007	2008	2009
Israeli Exports	$5.4m	$28.0m	$82.6m	$128.3m	$264.0m

Serving as the director of the Department of International Law in the Office of the Legal Adviser of Israel's Ministry of Foreign Affairs, Lenk rejoined the Office of the Legal Adviser following the conclusion of his tenure as Israel's ambassador to Azerbaijan in 2009, and worked from 2010 through 2013 as the Ministry's director of the Department of International Law. He was seconded to work during 2010-2011 as a staff member on the UN Secretary-General's Panel of Inquiry on the Gaza flotilla raid.

In August 2013, he arrived in Pretoria to begin serving as Israel's ambassador to South Africa and non-resident ambassador to Lesotho and Swaziland. He submitted his credentials to the President of South Africa Jacob Zuma on 16 October 2013. He submitted his credentials to the King of Swaziland Mswati III on 27 February 2014. He submitted his credentials to the King of Lesotho Letsie III on 2 July 2015. Lenk vocally promoted trade and development opportunities for South Africa with Israel, emphasizing topics like water management, technology and agriculture as areas where Israeli innovation has positively impacted life across Africa. During the 2014 Israel-Gaza conflict Lenk played an active role in representing Israel's position in South African traditional and social media.

In June 2016, Lenk led a special Israel-South African Water Week event bringing top Israeli water management experts to South Africa to share the country's experiences in combating drought. The events, held in Johannesburg, Cape Town and Durban, brought water experts from the two countries together. In April 2017, Ambassador Lenk led a large Israeli trade delegation to Swaziland, for the first ever bilateral trade seminar between the two countries.

== Publications ==
- "11 things I learned in South Africa". The Daily Maverick. South Africa. 3 July 2017.
- "Israel and Swaziland: Lots of work together to build our human fortress". Swazi Observer. Swaziland. 3 April 2017.
- "Israel's baseball team is the story of our shared heritage". The Times of Israel. Israel. 11 March 2017.
- "Tweeting for #IsraelUnderFire". The Daily Maverick. South Africa. 14 July 2014.
- "Chances for SA and Israel". The Citizen. South Africa. 4 September 2013. Archived from the original on 6 September 2013.
- אזרבייג'אן כמודל [Azerbaijan as a model]. Haaretz (in Hebrew). 28 June 2009.
  - English translation.
  - Russian translation in Zerkalo Nedeli.
  - Azerbaijani translation in Express.
- "Hateful words ... and an opportunity" (in Azerbaijani). 525. 26 September 2008.
  - 525 published a response from the Iranian Embassy on 3 October 2008.
- "Israel at 60: Azerbaijan is a key in our looking forward". 8 May 2014. Archived from the original on July 21, 2011.
  - appeared in Yeni Azerbaijan (Azerbaijani).
  - appeared in Express (Azerbaijani).
  - appeared in Zerkalo (Russian).
- "A New Beginning for Peace in the Middle East". 27 November 2007. Archived from the original on November 27, 2007.
  - appeared in Yeni Azerbaijan (Azerbaijani).
  - appeared in 525 (Azerbaijani).
  - appeared in Echo (Russian).
- "Iran's regional threat". 29 June 2007. Archived from the original on August 8, 2007.
  - appeared in Yeni Azerbaijan (Azerbaijani).
    - on 7 July 2007, Majid Feyzullahi, Press Officer of the Iranian Embassy in Baku published a response to this article titled "Who is a regional threat – Iran or the Zionist regime?"
  - appeared in Ayna (Azerbaijani).
  - appeared in Zerkalo Nedeli (Russian).
- "Iran's extreme leaders reject history". Archived from the original on July 4, 2007.
  - appeared in Echo in Russian on 20 or 21 December 2006.
  - appeared in Ekspress in Azerbaijani on 20 or 21 December 2006.
- "Hizbullah must be stopped", Yeni Azerbaycan, (Azerbaijani), Kaspiy (Russian), Kaspy (Azerbaijani), 25 July 2006
- "Israel and Azerbaijan: Cooperation serves the interests of our countries" (in Russian). Kaspiy. 3 May 2006. Archived from the original on September 28, 2007.
  - appeared in Ekspress (Azerbaijani).
- "The Iranian threat to destroy Israel" (in Russian). Zerkalo. 1 November 2005.
- "My tale of two courts". The Guardian. 15 July 2004.
- "Political Misuses of International Law: The Development of the 'Crime' of Population Transfer". Eyes on the ICC. 1: 71. 2004..
- "Prime Minister Sharon and the Belgian Tool' of Law". The Jewish Daily Forward. 28 February 2003.
- "Fact-Finding as a Negotiation Tool–The Mitchell Report and the Israel-Palestinian Peace Process". International and Comparative Law Review. 24 (3). Loyola Law School of Los Angeles: 289–325. June 2002.

== See also ==
- List of Israeli ambassadors to Azerbaijan
- Ambassadors of Israel
- Israel-Azerbaijan relations

Preceded by Eitan Naeh	Ambassador of Israel to Azerbaijan; 2005 - 2009	Succeeded by Michael Lavon - Lotem
Preceded by Dov Segev-Steinberg	Ambassador of Israel to South Africa; 2013 - 2017	Succeeded by Lior Keinan
