= David Shaltiel =

Israeli military officer (1903–1969)

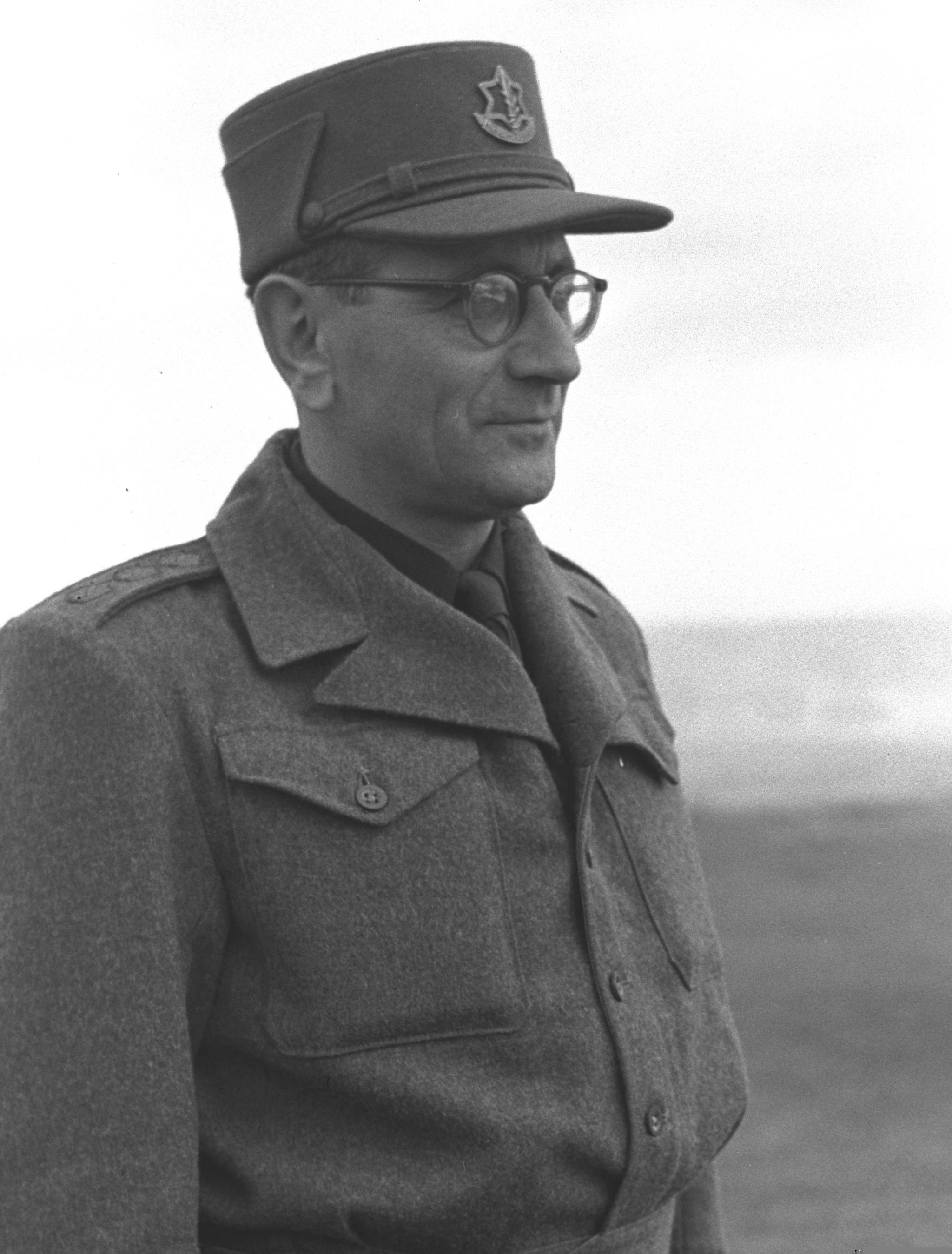
David Shaltiel, 1949

David Shaltiel (Hebrew: דוד שאלתיאל; 16 January 1903 – February 1969) was an Israeli military and intelligence officer, later also diplomat, and was most well known for being the district commander of the Haganah in Jerusalem during the 1948 Arab–Israeli War.

== Biography ==
David Shaltiel was born on 16 January 1903 in Berlin into a Portuguese Sephardic family, the oldest son of Benjamin Sealtiel and Helene Wormser. At 16, Shaltiel joined the Zionist youth movement Blau Weiss, and he went to Palestine in 1923. However, he was not happy there, and returned to Europe in 1925. From 1925 to 1930 he was enlisted in the French Foreign Legion. In 1934 he returned to Palestine. There he started working for the Haganah, being charged with buying arms in Europe. In 1936 he was captured in Aachen, Germany, by Gestapo. Shaltiel spent the next three years in prisons/concentration camps, including Dachau and Buchenwald. When he was sent to Berlin in 1939 the Haganah succeeded in freeing him. He then went back to Palestine. There he was at first arrested for his suspected involvement in the murder of three Arabs, but the charges were eventually dropped.

Shaltiel was married twice – first to Inge, then in 1942 to Yehudit, born Judith Irmgard Schonstedt (1913–2010), psychologist and daughter of a rabbinic family from Berlin. Shaltiel and Yehudit adopted a little girl, Tamar, who had to be returned to her biological mother. He died in Jerusalem in February 1969.

== Military career ==
In 1942–43, he was the Haganah Commander in Haifa. Fulfilling also the office of commander of the Counterintelligence Service - the "Ran" - and of the Intelligence Service – the Shin Yud or SHAI – of the Haganah, he was involved in the conflicts between the Haganah and the other Jewish underground groups - Irgun and Lehi.

Later, as Haganah's link to these organizations, he helped them coordinate several missions with the Haganah, among them the widely condemned attack at Deir Yassin. In 1948, he was the local Haganah district commander when the village was attacked by Irgun and Lehi's Jewish fighters, despite a non-aggression pact signed between the Zionists and the Mukhtar of the village, the villagers wanting to remain neutral in the war. At first Shaltiel did not agree with attacking Deir Yassin, but after a day he surrendered and wrote a letter to Irgun and Lehi, saying that he had "no objection to your carrying out the operation". Yitzchak Levi, head of the Jerusalem branch of Haganah Intelligence (SHAI), proposed that the inhabitants should be notified that the truce was over, but Shaltiel then refused to endanger the operation by warning them.

He was also the mastermind behind Operation Kedem, which had the goal of capturing "East Jerusalem". The mission was carried out on July 8, 1948, by Irgun troops and was a total failure. From that moment, he was, (according to himself), disgraced and his name was erased from official Israel history.

Between June 11 and July 21, 1948, he had a series of meetings, mediated by the UN, with Abdullah el Tell, the commander of Arab Legion troops in the Old City.

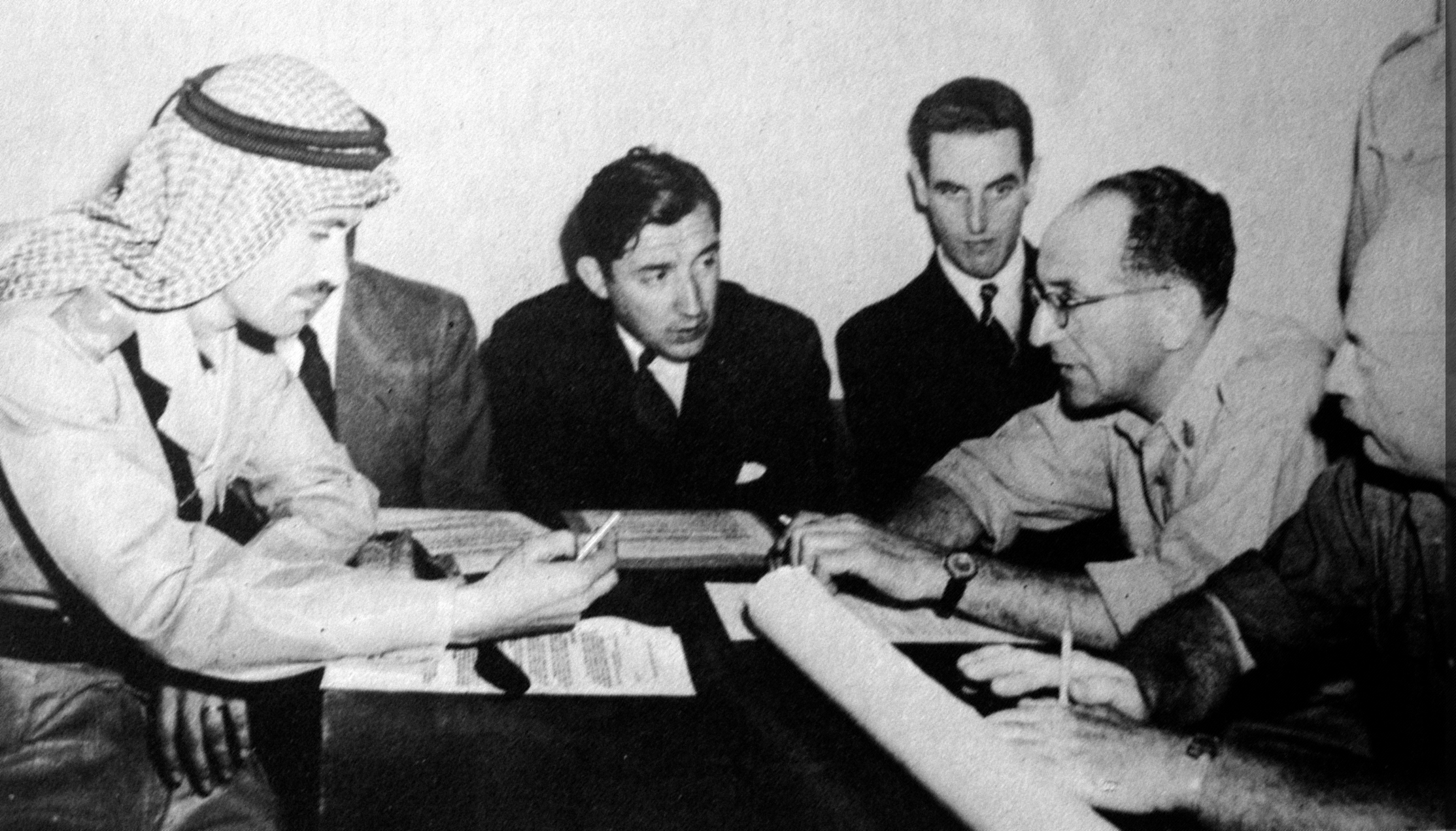
One of the meetings between Abdullah el Tell and David Shaltiel

On July 7 they signed the "Mount Scopus Agreement", which stated that the Jewish enclave at Mount Scopus should be de-militarized and would come under UN supervision. On July 15 the Haganah and Irgun launched a massive bombardment on the Old City, which was followed by infantry attacks on the New, Jaffa and Zion Gates. These failed to gain their objectives. On 21 July Shaltiel and el Tell signed a formal cease-fire based on the existing positions of their forces.

After the end of the Independence War, David Shaltiel founded the Border Corps of the Israeli army, Heyl Hasfar, and was its first commander. Later, because of administrative problems, he recommended the transfer of these units into the frame of the Israeli Police, and they became known as Border Guard, Mishmar Hagvul.

== Diplomatic career ==
In the years 1950–1952 Shaltiel served as military attaché of Israel in France, and later fulfilled several diplomatic charges - as Israel's plenipotentiary minister in Brazil, Venezuela and Cuba (1952–1956), then in Mexico and concurrently to the Dominican Republic and Honduras (1956–1959) and ambassador in Netherlands (1963–1966).

== Sources ==
- Collins/Lapierre: "O Jerusalem". 1973. History Book Club.
- Dayan, Moshe: "The Story of My Life." 1976. ISBN 0-688-03076-9.
- Lüth, Erich: David Shaltiel. Hamburger- Fremdenlegionär - Diplomat - Verteidiger von Jerusalem. 1970. Hans Christians Verlag.
- Michael Studemund-Halévy, Sioniste au parfum romanesque: la vie tourmentée de David Shaltiel (1903-1969, in: Christoph Miething (ed.), Politik und Religion im Judentum, Tübingen 1999, pp. 255–264.
- Eli Tzur, Michael Halévy, Moshe Aronwald, Shomer leYisrael: David Shaltiel, Tel Aviv 2001
