= Arye Oded =

Israeli diplomat (1929–2019)

Arye Oded (Hebrew: אריה עודד; 5 May 1929 - 3 February 2019) was an Israeli diplomat, scholar, and author of books and research articles about Africa - Israel relations, Islam, and Judaism in Africa.

Oded was a Research Fellow at the Abba Eban Centre for Israeli Diplomacy of the Hebrew University's Truman Institute in Jerusalem.

== Childhood ==
Oded was born during the British Mandate in 1929 in the Old City of Jerusalem to parents who had come from Aden in the early 1920s. In 1936, the family was caught up in the violent Arab riots in Jaffa and was helped by Christian-Arab neighbors. After the death of his father in 1938, he was raised in an Orthodox orphanage.

== Army service ==
After high school in 1947, Oded volunteered to work in and defend kibbutz Manara bordering Lebanon and a year later, at the outbreak of the 1947–1949 Palestine war, he joined a unit of the Palmach which had arrived to help defend the kibbutz which was under siege by the Arabs, led by the Syrian General Fawzi al-Qawuqji.

== Discovery of the Abayudaya in Uganda ==
After finishing his MA studies at the Hebrew University in Jerusalem in 1957, Oded entered Israel's Foreign Ministry. In 1961, when African countries started receiving their independence, Oded received a scholarship from Israel's Foreign Ministry to study for his doctorate at Makerere University in Uganda which was at the time the only university in East Africa. During his one-year stay in Uganda, he was informed about a community of African Jews who called themselves the Abayudaya (which means "Jews" in the local language), which was unknown to the outside world and had been founded in 1919 by Semei Kakungulu, a successful army general of the Buganda Kingdom. Oded was the first Israeli to make contact with this community and to conduct researches and interviews in Swahili as to how Semei Kakungulu came to convert to Judaism and how he founded the community During many years, Oded kept in contact with members of the community, except during Idi Amin's regime (1971–1979).

From the 1960s onwards, Oded had published books and articles on the Abayudaya in both Hebrew and English.

== Career as diplomat and scholar ==
Oded began his diplomatic career in Uganda in 1961. In the 1970s, during the rupture in relations between Israel and Africa, Oded served as Israeli Interest Officer in Kenya and as Israel's Permanent Representative at the United Nations Environment Program and UN-HABITAT Centre in Nairobi. In the 1990s, Oded served as Israel's Ambassador in Swaziland and Kenya and as non-resident Ambassador to Lesotho, Zambia, Mauritius and the Seychelles. Between the years 1991-1994, he initiated and conducted the renewal of diplomatic relations with Zambia, Mauritius, Seychelles, Tanzania and Uganda.

=== Returning the remains of Entebbe hostage Dora Bloch ===
After the fall of Ugandan dictator Idi Amin in 1979, the Israeli Foreign Ministry asked Oded, who was at the time Israel's ambassador to Kenya, to travel to Uganda to look for the remains of Mrs. Dora Bloch who had been on the plane hijacked by terrorists and forced to land in Entebbe airport in 1976 and who had been murdered while in Mulago Hospital in Kampala by Amin's soldiers and buried secretly in an unknown location. Oded was assisted by the then president of Uganda Yusuf Lule who had formerly been the Deputy Dean of Makerere University. In 1979 Lule informed Oded that they had found Dora Bloch's remains and he invited Oded to come to Uganda to retrieve them. Oded was accompanied by Benny Bloch, the son of Dora Bloch, and the Israeli pathologist Dr. Morris Rogov who identified the remains, which were then brought back to Israel for burial. At the departure ceremony at the airport, Dr. Kayira, the Deputy Minister of Internal Affairs, read a statement on behalf of the President Lule, the Government of Uganda and the people of Uganda, regretting and deploring the "tragic murder" of Dora Bloch. Oded attended the ceremony as the Israel Government Representative.

In 1995, Oded retired from the Ministry of Foreign Affairs, and became Senior Lecturer in African Studies at the Universities of Tel-Aviv and Jerusalem. Dr. Oded had written numerous books and research articles on Africa-Israel relations, Islam, Judaism in Africa and the Swahili language.

== Public activities ==
- Chairman, Aden Jewry Community in Israel
- Founder and Vice-Chairman, Israel - Africa Friendship Association

== Published books ==
- Islam in Uganda: Islamization through a Centralized State in Pre-Colonial Africa, Israel Universities Press, Jerusalem, 1974
- Africa and the Middle East Conflict, Lynne Rienner Publishers, London, Colorado, 1987
- Religion and Politics in Uganda: a Study of Islam and Judaism, East Africa Publishing House, Nairobi, 1995
- Islam and Politics in Kenya, Lynne Rienner Publishers, London, Colorado, 2000
- Uganda and Israel: A Paradigm of Changing Relations between Israel and Africa (Hebrew), Israel-Africa Friendship Association, Jerusalem, 2002
- Judaism in Africa: The Abayudaya of Uganda (Hebrew), Israel-Africa Friendship Association, Jerusalem, 2003
- Africa and Israel: A Unique Case of Radical Changes in Israel's Foreign Relations (Hebrew), Magnes Press, Hebrew University, Jerusalem, 2011
- Judaism in Africa: The Abayudaya of Uganda (translated from the Hebrew and updated), Israel-Africa Friendship Association, Jerusalem, 2013
- Africa and Israel: A Unique Case of Radical Changes in Israel's Foreign Policy (translated from the Hebrew and updated). In print.
- Africa, the Palestine Liberation Organization and Israel, the Leonard Davis Institute for International Relations, the Hebrew University of Jerusalem. Policy studies no. 37, 1990
- King, N.Q., Kasozi, A., Oded, A. Islam and the Confluence of Religions in Africa, American Academy of Religion, Florida, 1973
- Yegar, M., Govrin, Y., Oded, A. (eds.) Ministry of Foreign Affairs – the First Fifty Years (Hebrew), Jerusalem, 2002
