= Dan Stav =

Israeli diplomat

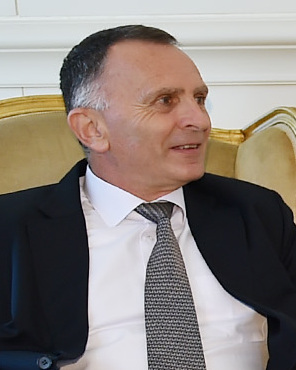
Stav, 2015

Dan Stav is an Israeli diplomat. He served as Israel's ambassador to Azerbaijan from 31 August 2015 until November 2019, and as ambassador to Nepal from 2005 until 2010.

== Biography ==
Dan Stav was born in Israel to a family of refugees from Germany. He studied International Relations at the Hebrew University of Jerusalem.

== Diplomatic career ==
As ambassador to Nepal, Stav organized a four-day environmental workshop attended by representatives of the UN's World Food Program and GTZ (German Technical Cooperation). As ambassador to Azerbaijan, he described the country as historically tolerant and welcoming of all citizens, including Jews. "There are strong ties between the Jewish and Azerbaijani people that were laid many centuries ago and today play an important role in further strengthening relations between our countries," he said."

== See also ==
- Israel-Azerbaijan relations
