= Aviva Raz Shechter =

Israeli diplomat

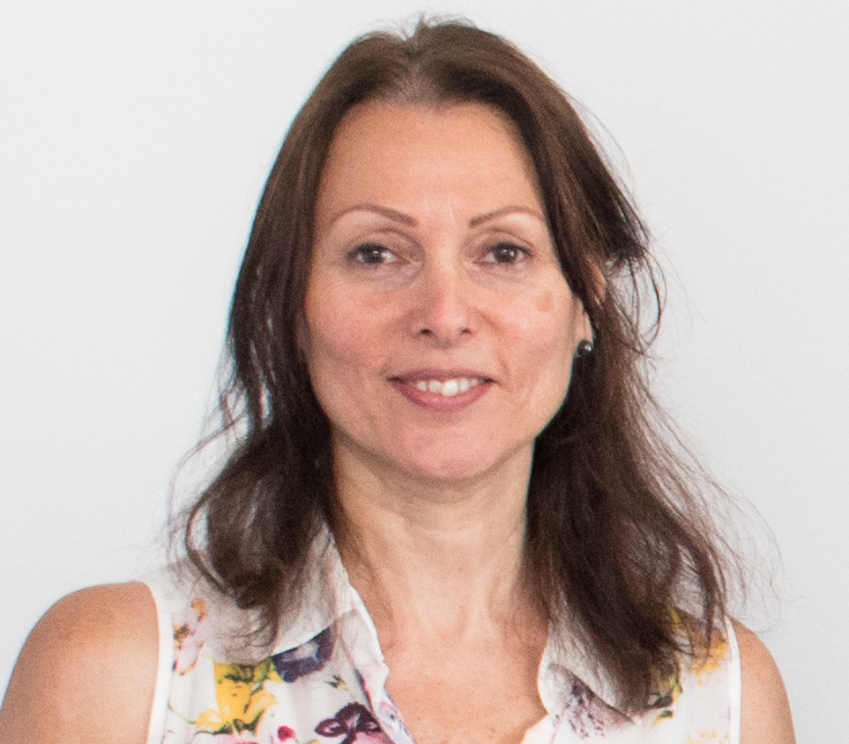
Aviva Raz Shechter, Israeli Ambassador

Aviva Raz Shechter (Hebrew: אביבה רז שכטר) was the Ambassador Extraordinary and Plenipotentiary, Permanent Representative of Israel to the United Nations and other International Organizations (the World Trade Organization and other International Organizations) in Geneva from 2016 to 2020, having presented her credentials on 22 August 2016.

In her farewell address on June 21, 2020, “Shechter, delivered a strong rebuke of the U.N. Human Rights Council ... (accusing) the council of unfairly targeting Israel and fostering ‘institutionalized anti-Semitism’ through its notorious Agenda Item 7”.

Raz Shechter has a degree from the Hebrew University of Jerusalem in Middle Eastern Studies.
