= List of ambassadors of Israel to Cuba =

== Lists of ambassadors ==
- Minister Jeonathan Prato 1960 - 1963
- Minister Yossef Keisari (Non-Resident, Mexico City), 1954 - 1956
