= Eliyahu Yerushalmi =

Israeli diplomat

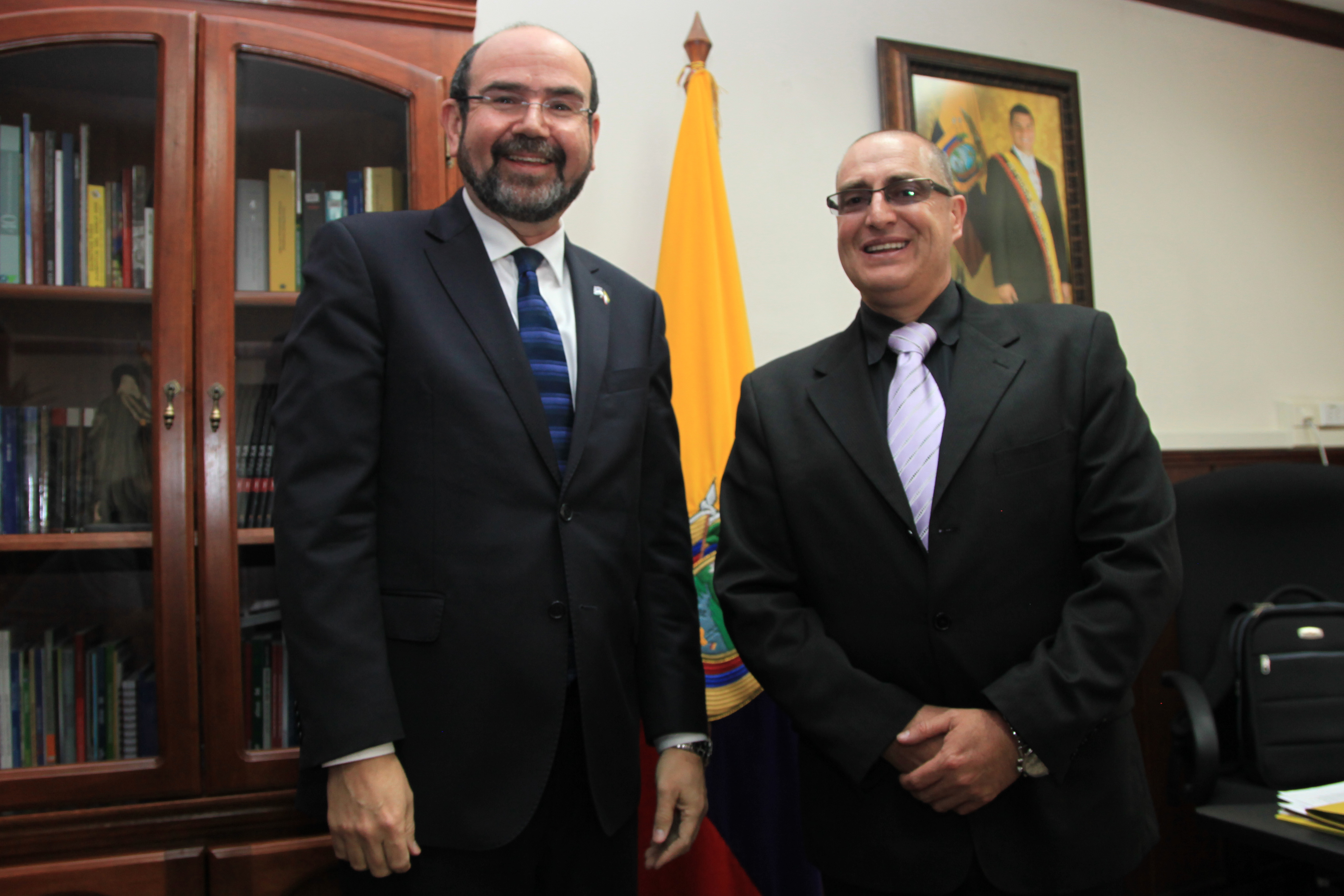
- Presentación de Cartas Credenciales del Embajador de Israel (7902369934)
- Born: July 24, 1954 (age 72); Haifa, Israel
- Education: University of Haifa
- Occupation: Diplomat
- Years active: 1979-2019

Eliyahu (Eli) Yerushalmi (Hebrew: אליהו (אלי) ירושלמי; Born 24 July 1954) is a retired Israeli diplomat who served as Ambassador to Ecuador, Armenia and Moldova at the Israeli Ministry of Foreign Affairs. He was the non-resident Israeli ambassador to Armenia (based in Jerusalem) from 2017 until 2018. He was also the non-resident ambassador to Moldova.

He also served as ambassador to Ecuador (2012–2016)

Yerushalmi earned his degree in political science at the University of Haifa.

== Biography ==
Yerushalmi was born in 1954 in Haifa, Israel, to Rabbi Simcha and Miryam Yerushalmi, Deputy Mayor of Rehovot, Israel and Principal of 'Tachkemoni' elementary school, accordingly.

He lived his childhood years in Israel, Argentina and the United States, due to his father's work for different Israeli institutions.

After his military service he completed his bachelor's degree in political science and Jewish history at Bar-Ilan University.

In 1979, Yerushalmi became the parliamentary assistant of the National Religious Party in the Knesset and after the 1981 election was appointed as head of the Deputy Foreign Minister's office at the Israeli Ministry of Foreign Affairs.

In 1984 he officially joined the Foreign Ministry and began his training process for diplomatic positions.

His extensive diplomatic career includes positions such as Vice Consul in Alexandria, Egypt (1985–1987), Consul to the southwestern United States-based in Houston, TX (1987–1990), assistant director of the Churches Division at the Ministry of Foreign Affairs (1990–1993), where he participated in the negotiations between Israel and the Holy See, which led to the establishment of diplomatic relations between Israel and the Vatican.

Yerushalmi served as the Minister Counsellor and later as the Charge d' Affairs at the Embassy of Israel in Ottawa, Canada (1993–1996), Minister Counsellor for Public Affairs at the Embassy of Israel in London, England (1998–2002) and Minister at the Embassy of Israel in Canberra, Australia, also dealing with the relations with New Zealand, Papua New Guinea and Fiji (2006–2010).

His service in Israel included positions such as Director of the Jewish Communities Department (2005–2006) and Chief of the OECD Directorate (2010–2012) at the Ministry of Foreign Affairs.

Yerushalmi graduated the Israel National Defense College and received his master's degree from Haifa University and then served as an instructor for high level Defense and Military officials at the college (1997–1998 and 2002–2005)

In 2012 Yerushalmi was appointed as Ambassador of Israel to Ecuador, serving there until 2016 and that year as the non- resident Ambassador of Israel to Armenia and Moldova, where he served until his retirement in 2019.

Currently Yerushalmi lectures on international relations in Israeli institutions and schools.
