= Nimrod Barkan =

Israeli diplomat (born 1952)

- נמרוד ברקן

18th Ambassador of Israel to Canada
- In office January 2016 – June 2022
- President: Reuven Rivlin
- Prime Minister: Naftali Bennett
- Preceded by: Rafael Barak

Personal details
- Born: September 1, 1952 (age 73)
- Citizenship: Israel
- Children: 2

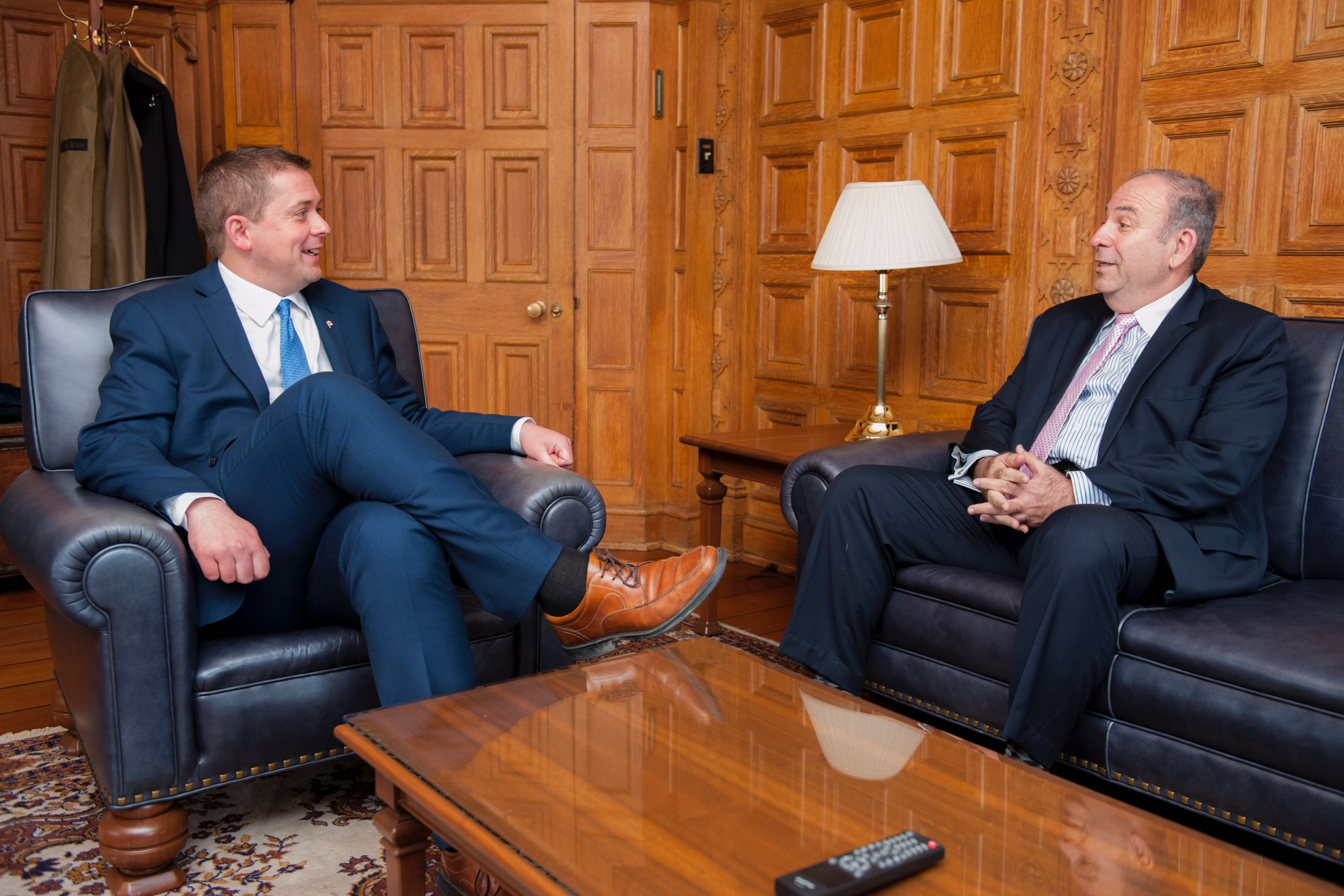
Barkan pictured with Canadian politician Andrew Scheer.

Nimrod Barkan (Hebrew: נמרוד ברקן; born September 1, 1952) is an Israeli diplomat and the Ambassador of Israel to Canada. Previously he was the consul general of Israel in San Francisco, Head of the Foreign Ministry Center for Policy Research and the Ambassador of Israel to UNESCO and the OECD, based in Paris. He has been a member of Israel's Foreign Service since 1977.

== Diplomatic career ==
Having completed his military service and academic studies, Barkan joined the Israeli Ministry of Foreign Affairs in 1977. His foreign assignments include serving as Consul of Israel for the Mid-Atlantic Region based in Philadelphia (1982–1985), Political Counselor in the Israeli Embassy in Cairo, Egypt (1985–1987), Minister for Public Affairs at the Embassy of Israel in Washington DC (1992–1995) and Consul General in the Pacific North West, based in San Francisco (1995–1997).

Barkan served at the Ministry's headquarters in Jerusalem as deputy director of the Minister Bureau and consultant to the Ministry of Defense on United States Congressional Affairs, Director of Egyptian Affairs (1988–1990), Director in the Department of Arms Control and Regional Security, Director of Palestinian Affairs Division and a member of the Negotiation Administration, participating in the Camp David Talks (1999–2000), Director of the Bureau of Strategic and Economic Affairs at the Foreign Ministry's Policy Research Center, Policy Adviser to the director general (2001–2002) and the director of the Bureau for World Jewish and Interreligious Affairs (2002–2006).

Barkan taught international relations while on the faculty of the National Defense College of Israel (1990–1992) and the Department of International Relations at the Hebrew University of Jerusalem.

He was the Head of the Foreign Ministry Center for Policy Research from January 2006 to January 2010, overseeing a major restructuring of the center.

From February 2010 to September 2014, Barkan was the Ambassador of Israel to Multilateral organizations in France (OECD, UNESCO, COE), based in Paris.

Between 2014 and 2016, Barkan was both an Abba Eban research fellow at the Truman Institute of the Hebrew University in Jerusalem and Ambassador for Special Assignments in the Bureau of International Organizations, representing Israel in the UN Third Committee Sessions.

In January 2016, the Israeli Government approved his appointment as the Ambassador of Israel to Canada.

Barkan announced his retirement on 11 November 2019. He plans to step down on the 29th. Prior to his retirement, Barkan accused Canada of voting in favor of Palestinian state.

== Personal life ==
Barkan is married and has two children.
