= Ilan Ben-Dov (diplomat) =

Israeli diplomat

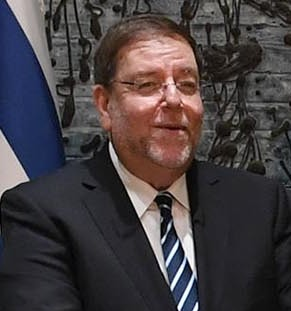
Ilan Ben-Dov

Ilan Ben-Dov (born 1959) is an Israeli diplomat. He was appointed Israel's Ambassador to Sweden in 2017.

== Early life and education ==
Ilan Ben-Dov was born in Tel Aviv, Israel in 1959. A Rothschild Scholarship recipient, he received his BA in Political Science, Sociology and Anthropology from Bar-Ilan University and earned his master's degree in International Relations from the Hebrew University of Jerusalem.

== Diplomatic career ==
At the completion of 3 years of service in the IDF and following a year as a political assistant in the Knesset during his studies, Ben-Dov joined the Israeli diplomatic service in 1986. In 1990-1995, Ben-Dov was responsible for public diplomacy at the Israeli Embassy in Germany. In this capacity, he was one of the first Israeli officials who started the new contacts with the former East Germany (DDR), a few months after Germany's unification. At the Israeli Embassy in Vienna, Austria, Ben-Dov started as Deputy Head of Mission and later served as Chargé d'affaires. In the year 2000, after Israel recalled its Ambassador to Vienna, Ben-Dov became Chargé d'affaires for a period of almost two years. Between 2005-2009, Ben-Dov served as Israel's Ambassador to Singapore, dealing mainly with promoting Israeli high-tech industry and relations in the fields of innovation and R&D with Singapore.

At the Ministry of Affairs in Jerusalem Ben-Dov has held several senior positions, most recently as the Director of the Central European Department.

== Personal life ==
Ben-Dov is married and has three children. He is fluent in Hebrew, English and German.
