= Israel–Thailand relations =

- Israel: Thailand

Diplomatic mission
- Embassy of Israel, Bangkok: Royal Thai Embassy, Tel Aviv

Envoy
- Ambassador Alona Fisher-Kamm: Ambassador Boonyarit Wichianphan

Israel–Thailand relations refers to diplomatic and cultural ties between the State of Israel and the Kingdom of Thailand. The countries have had official relations since June 1954. The Israeli embassy in Bangkok was established in 1958. Since 1996, Thailand has had an embassy in Tel Aviv.

== History ==
On 28 December 1972, a four-member commando of the Palestinian terrorist group Black September invaded the Israeli embassy in Bangkok and held the ambassador and several of his guests as hostages. Two Thai government members, Dawee Chullasapya and Chatichai Choonhavan, who was then deputy foreign minister and became prime minister in 1988, along with the Egyptian ambassador to Thailand, Mustapha el Assawy, negotiated the release of the hostages and instead offered themselves and a number of other Thai officials as surety for the terrorists' safe conduct to Cairo. Then-Israeli prime minister Golda Meir praised the Thai government for their diplomacy which made for a bloodless end of the crisis.

In January 2004, Princess Maha Chakri Sirindhorn inaugurated a joint Israeli-Thai agro-technology experimental farm for irrigation of high value crops at Khon Kaen University. There is a Thai-Israel Chamber of Commerce, Thai-Israel Friendship Foundation, as well as a small community of Israelis living in Thailand.

In 2011, Princess Chulabhorn Mahidol is involved in advancing scientific cooperation between the two countries.

In 2012, the two countries signed a trade agreement.

Thailand recognized Palestine in 2012. During 2014 Israel–Gaza conflict the Thai government supported a peaceful solution to the conflict and called on both sides to show restraint. It further stated that it will continue to support both Israel and Palestine, but will not condone terrorist activity by either side.

Thailand is one of the top tourist destinations for Israelis, and Israel became popular for Thai migrant workers. More than 20 thousand Thais are employed in Israel in agriculture and in Asian restaurants as cooks. They work legally under the aegis of the Thai–Israeli bilateral agreement, the Thai-Israel Cooperation on the Placement of Workers (TIC).

In September 2014, the two countries signed a cooperation agreement.

In July 2015, Israel and Thailand signed a medical cooperation agreement.

A delegation from the Thailand industrial association visited Israel in 2015.

The Thai public has historically been apathetic to the Israeli-Palestinian conflict, but the Muslim minority in the country, nearly 7.5 million, is generally sympathetic to Palestine.

=== Post October 7 attacks ===
The October 7 attacks resulted in the deaths of 46 Thai nationals and the abduction of 31 others to Gaza. Thai Prime Minister Srettha Thavisin expressed his condolences to Israel and mobilized resources for the emergency evacuation of Thai citizens. By early 2025, 23 of the 31 hostages had been released, while eight remained in captivity. However, by December 2025, the status of all 31 hostages was finally confirmed; 28 were released alive, and the remains of the final three victims were repatriated to Thailand, concluding the crisis for all Thai nationals.

In February 2026, Thai Foreign Minister Sihasak Phuangketkeow and Israeli Foreign Minister Gideon Sa'ar reaffirmed their strategic partnership during a high-level diplomatic call. They discussed the welfare of over 60,000 Thai workers currently in Israel and agreed to expand cooperation in medical diplomacy and cybersecurity.

Despite regional tensions in early 2026, including temporary airspace closures in March, both nations maintained strong consular ties to facilitate travel and ensure the safety of citizens.

=== Thai nationalist protests ===
In August 2026, Thai nationalist group Thai Mai Thon and others began a campaign to denounce the perceived misbehavior of Israelis in Thailand.

In September 2026, Thailand deported an Israeli who had threatened a zoo owner on the resort island of Ko Samui who had displayed a Palestinian flag. On September 10, 2026, a demonstration was led by Sondhi Limthongkul in front of the Israeli embassy in Bangkok. Protesters call on Israeli citizens to respect Thai laws and culture. They also called for an investigation into land ownership in Chachoengsao province and the activities of Chabad centers and related organizations. They stated in a letter to the Israeli ambassador to Thailand that Chabad centers are expanding and that these activities are an attempt to establish a territorial presence of Israelis in Thailand. Sondhi said the embassy and Israeli government should understand "generosity must never be mistaken for weakness, hospitality does not equate to submission to exploitation and courtesy is not an open license for anyone to act with impunity on our sovereign soil." A Rosh Hashanah celebration at the Chabad house in Phuket was canceled after Israeli officials warned of the risk of violence.

== Resident diplomatic missions ==
- Israel has an embassy in Bangkok.
- Thailand has an embassy in Tel Aviv.

== See also ==
- Foreign relations of Israel
- Foreign relations of Thailand
- History of the Jews in Thailand
- Israelis in Thailand
