= Darom =

Darom means 'south' in Hebrew.

Darom may also refer to:

== People ==
- Avraham Darom, former ambassador of Israel to Serbia (1961–63), Thailand (1965–68), and Mexico (1968–71)
- David Darom (1943-2021), Israeli marine biologist and nature photographer

== Places ==
- Daroma or Darom, historical region in southern Judeae/Palaestina Prima
- Bnei Darom, religious moshav in central Israel
- Deir al-Balah, known by Crusaders as Darom and by Arabs as Darum and Deir Darum in the past
- Gan HaDarom, moshav in southern Israel
- HaDarom, the Southern District - one of Israel's six administrative districts
- Kfar Darom, formera kibbutz in the Gaza Strip (1935-48, 1989-2005)
  - Battles of Kfar Darom (1947–1948)
- Ramah Darom, Jewish summer camp in Georgia, USA
- Shavei Darom, village in southern Israel
- Yesodot HaDarom, initial name of Sdei Avraham, a moshav in southern Israel

== Other ==
- Darom Adom ('Red South'), annual festival in southern Israel held during the anemone blossoming season
- Hapoel HaDarom Tel Aviv F.C. (2936-61), former Israeli football club based in Tel Aviv
- Pikud Darom ('Southern Command'), regional command of the Israel Defense Forces (IDF)
