= List of consuls general of Israel to the United States =

The following list of consuls general of Israel to the United States is arranged by the Israeli consulate's location in the United States. At each location the Israeli diplomats are listed in reverse chronological order.

== Consulates ==
=== Atlanta ===
- Anat Sultan-Dadon assumed her role as the consul general of Israel to the Southeastern United States in July 2019.
- Consul General Judith Varnai-Shorer 2015–2019
- Consul General Opher Aviran 2010–2015
- Consul General Reda Mansour 2006–2010
- Consul General Shmuel Ben-Shmuel 2002–2006
- Consul General Jacob Rosen 2000–2002
- Consul General Arye Mekel 1993–2000
- Consul General Yoel Arnon 1977–1982
- Consul General Nahum Astar 1975–1977
- Consul General Shlomo Levy 1973–1975
- Consul General Benjamin Bonney 1972–1973
- Consul General Moshe Gilboa 1969–1972
- Consul General Zeev Bone 1966–1969
- Consul General Nahum Astar 1956–1959

=== Boston ===
- Consul General Meron Reuben 2020–
- Consul General Zeev Boker 2018–2020
- Consul General Yehuda Yaakov 2014–2018
- Consul General Shai Bazak 2010–2013
- Consul General Nadav Tamir 2006–2010
- Consul General Meir Shlomo 2002–2006
- Consul General Itzhak Levanon 1997–2002
- Consul General Dan Kyram 1993–1997
- Consul General Yaakov Levy1989–1993
- Consul General Arthur Avnon 1986–1989
- Consul General Michael Shiloh 1983–1986
- Consul General Michael Bavly 1978–1981
- Consul General Shimshon Inbal 1972–1976
- Consul General Raanan Sivan 1976
- Consul General Yohanan Cohen 1965–1968

=== Chicago ===
- Consul General Yinam Cohen 2021–
- Consul General Aviv Ezra 2016– 2021
- Consul General Roey Gilad 2012–2016
- Consul General Orli Gil 2008–2012
- Consul General Barukh Binah 2005–2008
- Consul General Moshe Ram 2001–2005
- Consul General Tzipora Rimon 1997–2001
- Consul General Arthur Avnon 1992–1997
- Consul General Ori Brener 1988–1991
- Consul General Zvi Brosh 1985–1988
- Consul General Moshe Gilboa 1979–1981
- Consul General Ehud Avriel 1974–1977
- Consul General Shaul Ramati 1969–1974
- Consul General David Tesher 1957–1963
- Consul General Simcha Pratt 1956–1957
- Consul General Nahum Astar 1953
- Consul General Yerachmiel Ram Yaron 1952–1953

=== Houston ===
- Consul General Livia Link-Raviv 2021–
- Consul General Gilad Katz 2017–
- Consul General Eitan Levon 2015–2017
- Consul General Meir Shlomo 2010–2015
- Consul General Asher Yarden 2006–2010
- Consul General Yael Ravia-Zadok 2002–2005
- Consul General Zion Evrony 1995–2002
- Consul General Meir Romem 1992–1995
- Consul General Mordecai Artzieli 1988–1992
- Consul General Yoram Ettinger 1985–1988
- Consul General Zeev Dover 1983–1985
- Consul General Moshe Gidron 1979–1983
- Consul General Yitzhak Leor 1976–1979
- Consul General Benjamin Bonney1969–1972
- Consul General Yaacov Hess 1966–1969

=== Los Angeles ===
- Consul General Hillel Newman 2019–
- Consul General Sam Grundwerg 2016–2019
- Consul General David Siegel 2011–2016
- Consul General Jacob-Shaul Dayan 2007–2011
- Consul General Ehud Danoch 2004–2007
- Consul General Yuval Rotem 1999–2004
- Consul General Yoram Ben-Zeev 1995–1999
- Consul General Eytan Bentsur 1986–1988
- Consul General Binyamin Navon 1978–1986
- Consul General Zvi Brosh 1976–1978
- Consul General Hanoch Givton 1975–1976
- Consul General Yakov Aviad 1972–1975
- Consul General Yehezkel Carmel 1970–1972
- Consul General Mordechai Shalev 1961–1965
- Consul General Yaacov Avnon 1958–1961
- Consul General Avraham Biran 1955–1958
- Consul General Harry Beilin 1951–1954
- Consul General Reuven Dafni 1948–1951

=== Miami ===
- Consul General Maor Elbaz-Starinsky 2021–
- Consul General Lior Haiat 2016–2021
- Consul General Ofer Bavly 2007–2011
- Consul General Yitzhak Ben Gad 2005–2007
- Consul General Michael Arbel 2000–2004
- Consul General Shai Bazak 1998–2000
- Consul General Yoel Arnon 1982–1983

=== New York ===
- Consul General Ofir Akunis 2024–
- Acting Consul General Tsach Saar 2023–2024
- Consul General Asaf Zamir 2021–2023
- Consul General Daniel Dayan 2016–2020
- Consul General Ido Aharoni 2011–2016
- Consul General Asaf Shariv 2007–2010
- Consul General Arye Mekel 2004–2007
- Consul General Alon Pinkas 2000–2004
- Consul General Shmuel Siso 1997–2001
- Consul General Colette Avital 1992–1996
- Consul General Uriel Savir 1988–1992
- Consul General Yoseph Kedar 1978
- Consul General Uri Ben-Ari 1975–1978
- Consul General David Rivlin 1971–1975
- Consul General Rehavam Amir 1968–1971
- Consul General Micahel Arnon 1965–1968
- Consul General Katriel Katz 1962–1965
- Consul General Arie Eshel 1962
- Consul General Binyamin Eliav 1960–1961
- Consul General Simcha Pratt 1957–1960
- Consul General Semah Cecil Hyman 1955–1957
- Consul General Avraham Harman 1953–1955
- Consul General Arthur Lourie (diplomat) 1948–1953

=== Philadelphia ===
- Consul General Yaron Sideman 2012–2016
- Consul General Daniel Kutner 2008–2012
- Consul General Uriel Palti 2004–2008
- Consul General Giora Becher 2000–2004
- Consul General Dan Ashbel 1997–2000
- Consul General Eviatar Manor 1993–1996
- Consul General Pinchas Gonen 1981–1985
- Consul General Asher Naim 1976–1981
- Consul General Yissakhar Ben-Yaakov 1966–1969

=== San Francisco ===
- Consul General Shlomi Kofman 2017–
- Consul General Andy David 2012–2017
- Consul General Akiva Tor 2008–2012
- Consul General David Akov 2004–2008
- Consul General Yosef Amrani 2000–2004
- Consul General Daniel Shek 1999–2000
- Consul General Nimrod Barkan 1995–1997
- Consul General Jehudi Kinar 1993–1995
- Consul General Harry Kney-Tal 1988–1993
- Consul General Mordecai Artzieli 1977–1982
- Consul General Shlomo Tadmor 1976–1977
- Consul General Gideon Saguy 1963–1968

== See also ==
- Israel–United States relations
- List of ambassadors of Israel to the United States
