= Efrat Machikawa =

Israeli Activist

- אפרת מצ'יקווה
- Machikawa speaking at a hostage advocacy event
- Occupations: Activist, diplomat

Efrat Machikawa (Hebrew: אפרת מצ'יקווה) is an Israeli activist and former diplomat. She served as the Culture, Science and Innovation Attaché at the Israeli Embassy in Japan. Following the October 7 attacks, she began working on advocacy for Israeli hostages in Gaza. This work started after several of her own family members were taken during the attacks.

== Career ==
Machikawa holds a bachelor's degree from the Hebrew University of Jerusalem and a master's degree from the University of Edinburgh.

During her time in Japan, Machikawa handled cultural and scientific initiatives for the Israeli embassy.

Currently, she is a doctoral student at Ben-Gurion University of the Negev in the Medical Sciences department. Her research paper from 2022 looked at how nursing students use simulation training.

== Activism ==
Machikawa began campaigning for the release of the hostages after several of her family members were taken, including her uncle Gadi Moses, in the Kidnapping of Gadi Moses. She acts as a spokesperson for the Hostages and Missing Families Forum and has spoken at various public events. She was involved in efforts to get medicine to hostages and Palestinian children with cancer.

In July 2024, Machikawa spoke to around 100 U.S. lawmakers at the United States Capitol, before Prime Minister Benjamin Netanyahu's address to Congress.

In September 2024, Machikawa spoke as the representative of the Institute for NGO Research at the 57th regular session of the United Nations Human Rights Council.

On 7 October 2026, Machikawa gave remarks at the Bundestag during the opening of the exhibition Israel 733:02:35, commemorating the third anniversary of the October 7 attacks. She also led the exhibition's Anemone Field Community Project.

Her comments on the crisis have appeared in the BBC, Time, and The New York Times. She has also been interviewed by Deutsche Welle, ABC Radio National,CNN,PBS NewsHour, Haaretz, as well as a profile piece in The Japan Times.
