= History of the Jews in Thailand =

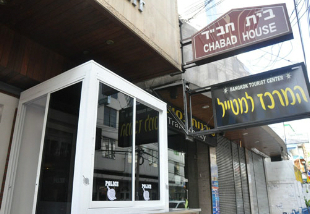
Chabad House in Bangkok. 2011

The history of the Jews in Thailand dates to at least the 17th century, when Jewish merchants employed by the English East India Company lived in the Siamese Ayutthaya Kingdom. Until the end of the 19th century there was not a permanent Jewish community in Thailand, around 1890, Eastern European Jewish families settled in Bangkok.

In the 1930s, approximately 120 German Jews fleeing Nazi persecution took refuge in Thailand with the help of local Jewish residents; they were admitted over the objections of the German government, which had pushed for their exclusion. Several Syrian and Lebanese Jews also settled in Bangkok during World War II and became established in local industries, particularly textiles. After Japan invaded Thailand in 1941, some Bangkok Jews were interned as enemy aliens, and at least 150 Allied Jewish soldiers were held in the Japanese prisoner-of-war camp at Kanchanaburi. Most of the German Jewish refugees who had arrived in the 1930s left Thailand at the war's end.

Thailand has had friendly diplomatic relations with Israel since 1954.

In the 1970s, United States military chaplains stationed in Thailand during the Vietnam War served as the community's first resident rabbis. During this period, a Jewish religious school and regular social and religious events were established. Israeli tourism also increased during this time, and several Israelis took up residence in Bangkok.

Yosef Chaim Kantor, a Chabad-Lubavitch Rabbi, sent under the mandate of the leader of the movement, Menachen Schneerson, in Brookllyn, arrived in 1993 at the request of the local Jewish community to become Bangkok's first permanent rabbi, presiding over the Beth Elisheva synagogue. He was joined in 1995 by Rabbi Nechemya Wilhelm, also of Chabad, who focused on serving Jewish travelers.

The contemporary Jewish community of Thailand is of both Sephardic and Ashkenazi descent. The Ashkenazi population descends largely from Russian Jews who fled Soviet persecution in the early 20th century. There are also Persian Jews who emigrated during the 1970s and 1980s, fleeing persecution and regime change.

The country's permanent Jewish community, with over 1,000 members, is mainly located in Bangkok (especially in the Khaosan Road area). There are also small groups of Jews with synagogues in Phuket, Chiang Mai, Ko Samui and Koh Pha-ngan. During Jewish holidays and weekly Shabbat services, they are joined by vacationing Jews, especially from Israel and the United States, leading to Shabbat dinners with close to 1,000 people most weekends.

== Chabad ==
Chabad of Bangkok is a Chabad House in Bangkok, catering primarily to Israeli tourists. It was an important center of disaster relief after the 2004 tsunami. It serves Sabbath meals to hundreds of Jewish travelers every week, including during Jewish religious festivals such as Passover. Due to security concerns in the aftermath of the 2008 Mumbai attacks, entry is restricted to the Jewish community.

== Jewish education ==
A complete range of Jewish education services is available in Bangkok, from kindergarten through high school. This includes a recently opened Orthodox yeshiva. After years of government refusal, permission has also been granted for the establishment of a Jewish cemetery next to the Bangkok Protestant Cemetery in Bang Kho Laem.

== See also ==
- Israelis in Thailand
