= Akiva Tor =

- עקיבא תור
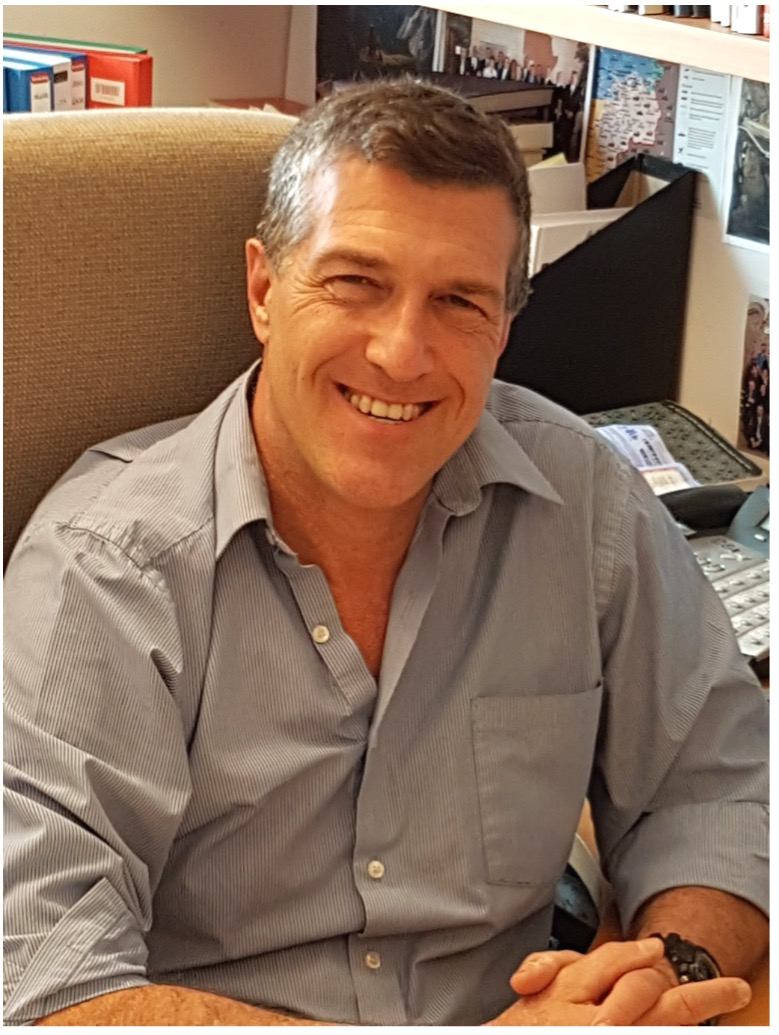

14th Israeli Ambassador to the Republic of Korea
- In office 2020–2024
- President: Isaac Herzog
- Prime Minister: Benjamin Netanyahu
- Preceding: Rafael Harpaz
- Preceded by: Chaim Choshen

Personal details
- Born: 17 December 1960 (age 65) Fort Jackson, South Carolina
- Education: Columbia University Hebrew University of Jerusalem Harvard University
- Occupation: Diplomat

Akiva Tor (Hebrew: עקיבא תור; born December 17, 1960) is an Israeli career diplomat. In his last position he served as Israel's Ambassador to the Republic of Korea. Previously he served as Consul General in San Francisco and the Pacific Northwest.

== Biography ==
Tor was born on Fort Jackson, South Carolina on December 17, 1960. His father Rabbi Gerald Turk was the first Hillel Director at Kent State University after the May 1970 Kent State shootings. His mother, Dr. Phyllis Turk, was a cultural anthropologist and university instructor of Hebrew.

In 1985 Tor made aliyah to Israel, and was drafted into the Israel Defense Forces where he served as a paratrooper and infantry officer until 1987. He served in the IDF reserves as an infantry captain until 2008.

=== Education ===
Tor was raised in Cleveland, Ohio. He received a Modern Orthodox Jewish education, and deferred his college studies in order to study in Israeli Yeshiva academies between 1979 and 1981.

Tor received his B.A. in analytical philosophy from Columbia University in 1985. He received his MA in Political Science and Contemporary Jewish Thought from the Hebrew University of Jerusalem, and a Master of Public Administration from the Harvard University Kennedy School of Government in 2003 with the support of the Wexner Foundation. He was a Goldman Fellow at Tel Aviv University in 2020.

== Diplomatic Career and Postings ==
Tor entered the Israel Foreign Ministry cadet course in November 1987. He served as Director of the Israel Economic and Cultural Office in Taipei in 1996. On return to Israel he served as Deputy Spokesman from 1998 to 2000 and deputy director of the Department for Palestinian Affairs from 2000 to 2002.

From 2003 to 2006, he was the World Jewish Affairs Adviser to the President of Israel, Moshe Katsav.

From 2008 to 2012, he served as the Israel Consul General in San Francisco and Pacific Northwest.

From 2013 to 2020, he was the Head of Bureau for World Jewish Affairs and World Religions in Ministry of Foreign Affairs.

In June 2020 Tor was named Israeli Ambassador to South Korea. He assumed post in November 2020, and held it until August 2024.

== Policy Positions and Initiatives ==
=== Israel’s Relations with World Jewry ===
==== Strengthening Ties with Liberal Jewry ====
As Consul General in San Francisco, Tor advocated for a wide tent, welcoming conversations with people critical of Israel but Jewishly engaged, while drawing the line at any active support of the Boycott, Divestment and Sanctions (BDS) movement. At the Berkeley University Student Senate divestment hearings in March 2010, Tor delivered the keynote address in defense of Israel and remained present in the hall with the Jewish and pro-Israel students throughout the entire two nights.

Tor is an advocate for proactive engagement with Jewish Reform and Conservative movements in the United States in order overcome tensions in their relationship with Israel. In 2015 Tor proposed the establishment of a Peace Corps of the Jewish People as a major philanthropic initiative which would give appropriate expression to the Jewish people's desire to contribute to the developing world and serve as an incubator for emerging Israeli and Diaspora Jewish leadership.

Between 2016 – 2018, his bureau carried out the Ministry of Foreign Affairs – Hebrew Union College Rabbinic Seminar in Israel in which the majority of graduating HUC rabbinical students took part, and prepared resources for Israel – Diaspora engagement in cooperation with the Shalom Hartman Institute.

==== Fighting anti-Semitism ====
As Head of Bureau for World Jewish Affairs and World Religions Tor directed much of his team's efforts to fighting anti-Semitism. During Tor's tenure in office Israeli diplomacy, in cooperation with major American Jewish organizations, launched a concerted effort to achieve international recognition of the International Holocaust Remembrance Alliance (IHRA) working definition of anti-Semitism. At the end of 2018, 28 countries had adopted the definition, as well as the European Union. The effort to achieve adoption in OSCE was blocked by objections from the Russian Federation.

In August 2021, during Tor's term as Ambassador to the Republic of Korea, it became the first Asian nation to adopt the IHRA working definition of anti-Semitism.

In 2015 and 2018 Tor's bureau convened the two largest gatherings of the Global Forum for Combating Antisemitism. Both focused on the emergence of online antisemitism, calling for social media companies to adopt universal guidelines against hate speech. They also dealt with threats of antisemitism in the progressive camp in the United States and in Europe's populist far right.

Tor advocated against Israeli diplomatic engagement with European political parties of the far right, including the Austrian Freedom Party, due to their antisemitism and hostility to local Jewish communities. In 2017 he proposed a three-tiered policy of cordon sanitaire. Despite opposition from some Israeli politicians and opinion makers, this has remained the official policy of subsequent Israeli governments: (1) A principled boycott of neo-Nazi or openly anti-Semitic parties; (2) Avoidance of engagement with parties with Nazi and/or fascist roots and seeking to formulate policy in coordination with the local Jewish communities; (3) Formulating informed policies towards populist right-wing parties on a case-by-case basis.

=== Strengthening Israel-Korea Relations ===
During Tor's tenure in Seoul, Israel carried out the first-ever bilateral COVID-19 vaccine swap, transferring over 750,000 Pfizer vaccines to Korea. In 2022 the Israel-Korea Free Trade Agreement was signed, marking Israel's first FTA in Asia and Korea's first FTA in the Middle East. In 2024 the Israel Education Research Center was inaugurated at Seoul National University. Tor also hosted a weekly radio program Bible Study with Israel Ambassador.

==== Technological and Economic Diplomacy ====
In September 2022 the Israeli embassy in Seoul launched the first embassy metaverse in the world, allowing Israelis and Koreans to interact in virtual space.

During Tor's term as Ambassador to the Republic of Korea, the Israel Industrial Research and Development Fund (KORIL) was doubled in size to eight million dollars annually. The Korea – Israel Technology Fund, which capitalized at 80 million dollars for joint technology investment was announced shortly after he concluded his term.

=== Controversies ===
==== Oct. 7th Hamas Attack on Seoul Video ====
The Israel Embassy in Korea came under heavy criticism in the Korean press for the production of a YouTube video depicting a Hamas attack in central Seoul which was understood as invoking public fear of a North Korean attack. Tor apologized for harming the public calm and the embassy removed the video from all its media.

==== Conflict with Korean progressive parties ====
Following repeated anti-Israel signage outside the Israeli embassy, Tor wrote to the chairpersons of the Green, Labor and Justice parties asking them to refrain from using the term "From the river to the sea Palestine will be free" as this terminology inferred the destruction of the Israeli state. Tor's letter was torn up on YouTube by representatives of the receiving parties.

==== Position against engagement with FPO, Austrian Freedom Party ====
Tor's position against dialogue with the Austrian Freedom Party was attacked by Member of Knesset Yehudah Glick and by Makor Rishon columnist Ariel Kahana, who accused Tor of intransigence and harming Israel's diplomatic relations in placing unwarranted restrictions on Israel's diplomatic engagement with an Austrian political party. The Israel Foreign Ministry however supported Tor's position.

==== Defense of San Francisco Jewish Film Festival ====
Following controversy over the San Francisco Jewish Film Festival screening of Rachel and its invitation to Cindy Corrie as guest speaker, Tor supported the decision of the San Francisco Jewish Federation not to cancel funding to the festival. Tor's position was criticized by conservative members in the Jewish community, some of whom complained to Foreign Minister Avigdor Lieberman. Tor criticized the decision of the festival to invite Cindy Corrie as inappropriate, but claimed the festival was too important a vehicle of Jewish and Israeli culture in the Bay Area to be destroyed because of a mistake, even a significant one.

== Personal life ==
Akiva Tor is married to Dr. Naomi Tor, a mediator and community social worker. They live in Beit Shemesh and have four children.

== Select Writings and Publications ==
- Genesis: The Beginning of Everything (in Korean), in Miraesa Publishing. 2024
- Interview With H.E. Akiva Tor, Ambassador of Israel to the Republic of Korea, in Asia Society. Published June 28, 2021
- Bridge Over Troubled Waters: A Peace Corps for the Jewish People, in Times of Israel. Published October 27, 2015
- The Jewish Blindness (Hebrew), in Eretz Acheret, January 2011
- BDS and Hopelessness, in Zeek. Published May 13, 2010
- Disengagement as Hope, in Sh’ma: A Journal of Jewish Responsibility, September 2004
- The Enlightened Foreign Ministry (Hebrew) in Rishumim, June 2000
- Tisha B'Av in the Age of the Third Temple in Midstream, August/September 1991
