= Alona Fisher-Kamm =

Israeli diplomat

Israeli Ambassador to Thailand
- Incumbent
- Assumed office May 2025
- President: Isaac Herzog
- Preceded by: Orna Sagiv

Alona Fisher-Kamm (Hebrew: אלונה פישר-קם) is an Israeli diplomat, serving as the Israeli Ambassador to Thailand since 2025.

== Career ==
Fisher-Kamm was previously the Israeli Ambassador to Serbia since 2016 and non-resident Ambassador to Montenegro from 2016 to 2020.

In September 2022, Fisher-Kamm was temporarily appointed head of the Israeli Liaison Office in Morocco amid investigations of sexual misconduct allegations against David Govrin.

=== Ambassador to Thailand ===
On 31 March 2025, Fisher-Kamm was appointed Ambassador of Israel-Designate to Thailand, succeeding Orna Sagiv.

On 8 September 2026, Fisher-Kamm met with Thai foreign minister and Deputy Prime Minister Sihasak Phuangketkeow to discuss recent incidents involving Israelis in Thailand, including tourists. After the meeting, Sihasak told reporters, "This was a frank, straight-to-the-point conversation," adding, "The issue is one that is causing real concern among Thai people – it concerns a series of incidents involving Israeli nationals in Thailand, whether they are tourists or those running businesses here."

In the aftermath of September 2026 anti-Israeli protests in front of the Embassy of Israel in Bangkok, Fisher-Kamm said, "We have to work together to make sure that the conflict in the Middle East is not imported here to Thailand."

== Education ==
- PhD. Political Science, Tel Aviv University “Israel in the Intellectual Discourse of the Left in Europe – The Framing of Israel in the Media in Spain, France and Britain”
- 2010-2015 PhD. Student, Political Science, Tel Aviv University
- 2009-2010 M.A. Studies, National Security College and Haifa University
- 1995-1998 M.A. Studies in Political Science, Tel Aviv University
- 1986-1989 B.A. Studies in Political Science, Tel Aviv University
