= Israel–Japan relations =

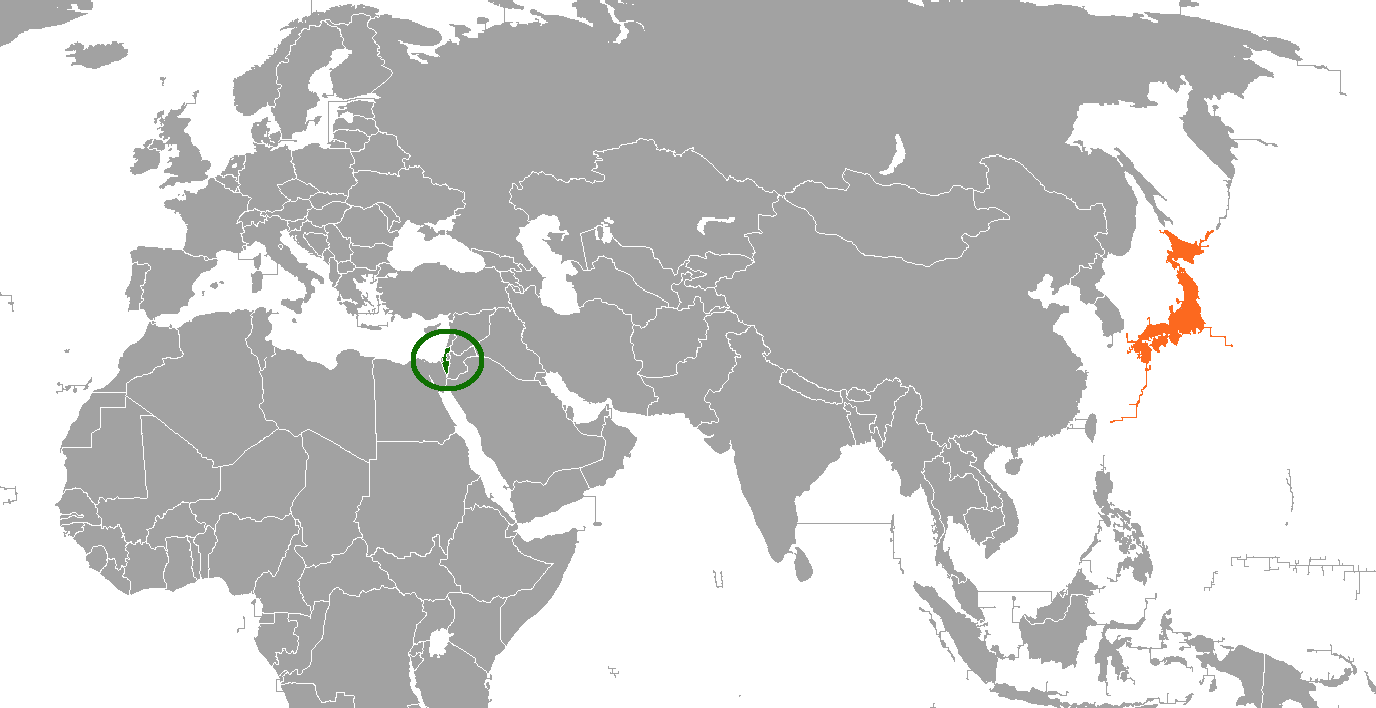
- Israel: Japan

Diplomatic mission
- Embassy of the State of Israel, Tokyo: Embassy of Japan, Tel Aviv

Envoy
- Ambassador Gilad Cohen: Ambassador Arai Yusuke

Israel–Japan relations (Hebrew: יחסי ישראל יפן; Japanese: 日本とイスラエルの関係) began on May 15, 1952, when Japan recognized Israel and an Israeli legation opened in Tokyo. In 1954, Japan's ambassador to Turkey assumed the additional role of minister to Israel. In 1955, a Japanese legation with a minister plenipotentiary opened in Tel Aviv. In 1963, relations were upgraded to Embassy level and have remained on that level since then. Today relations between the two countries have centered around economic and scientific partnerships which mutually benefit each country. The two countries also cooperated in defense.

Up until the 1990s, Japan's trade relations with Arab League members and most Muslim-majority countries took a precedence over those with Israel. However, due to the declining price of oil in early 2015, as well as internal political shifting in Japan, the two nations have sought to seek increased scientific, economic and cultural ties, particularly in the sphere of high-tech start-ups and defense contracting. Since the mid-2010s, ties between Israel and Japan have strengthened significantly, involving a myriad of mutual investments between the two nations. Former prime minister of Japan Shinzo Abe visited Israel twice – once in 2015 and a second time in 2018. Total volume of trade between the two countries is $3.574 billion as of 2022. In 2021, there were 1,156 Japanese citizens living in Israel and 589 Israelis living in Japan. In the 21st century, Israeli and Japanese relations have focused on collaboration on scientific and technological endeavours as well as defense cooperation. Japan has enjoyed an increased access to Israel's high-tech sector, securing benefits, Israeli human capital and talent for Japanese private commercial and public ventures. Israel also reaped significant investment in that same sector.

== History ==
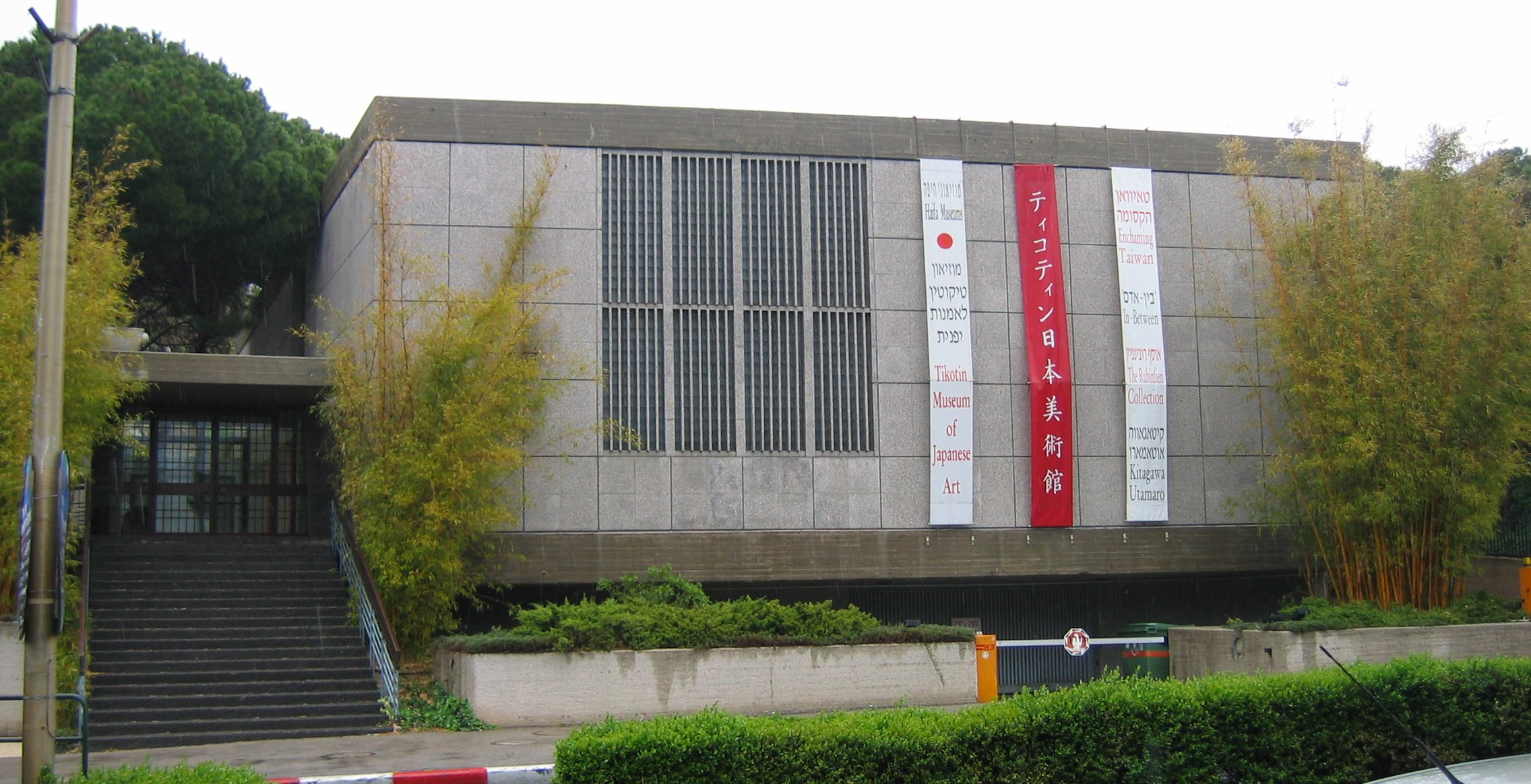
The Tikotin Museum of Japanese Art, first opened in 1960, in Haifa, Israel

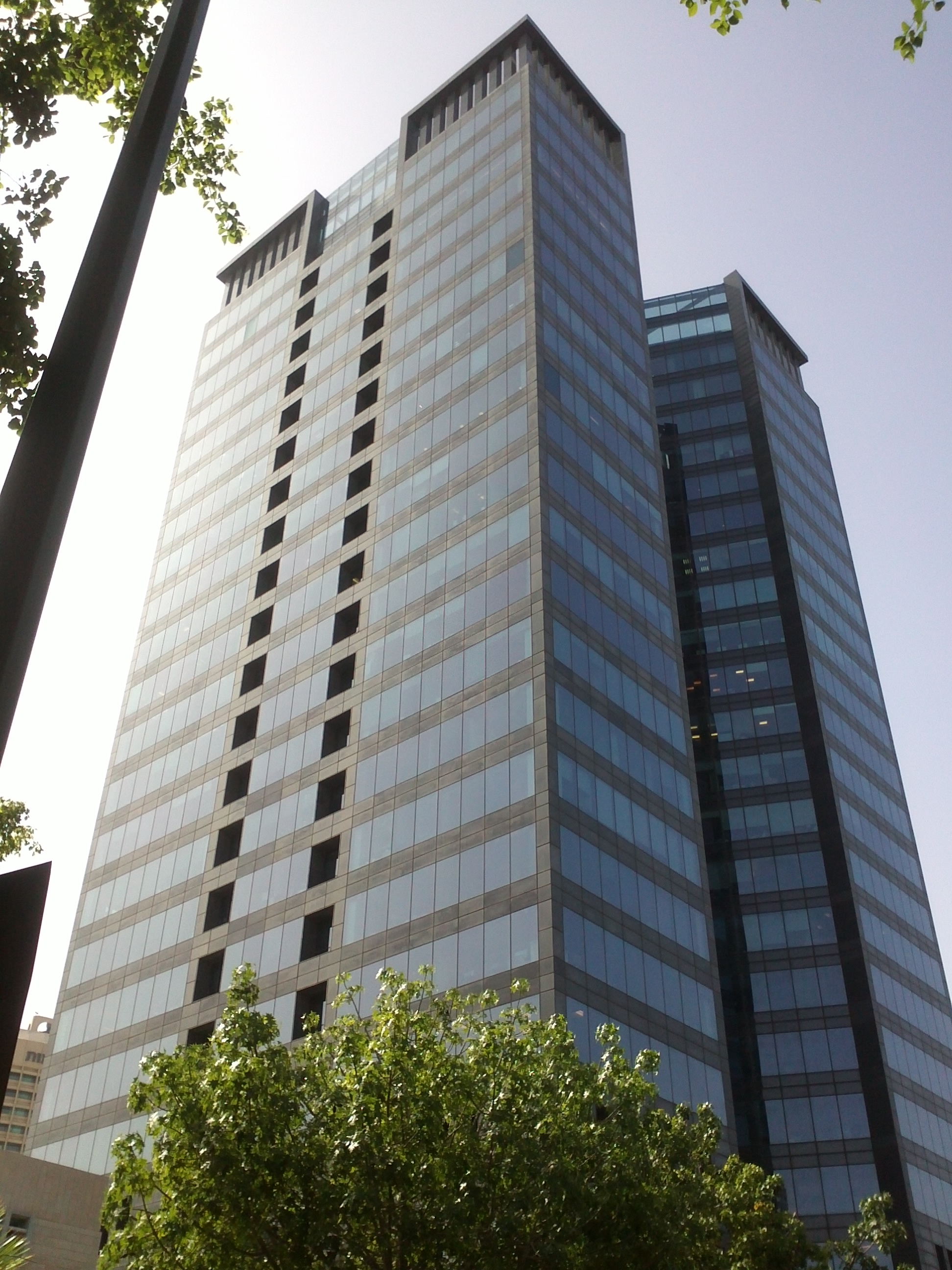
Japanese Embassy, Tel Aviv

In 1993 both nations signed the "Convention between Japan and the State of Israel for the Avoidance of Double Taxation and the Prevention of Fiscal Evasion with Respect to Taxes on Income." In 2000, the two nations signed the "Agreement between the Government of Japan and the Government of the State of Israel for Air Services." There were 708 Japanese nationals in Israel as of October 1999 and 604 Israeli nationals in Japan as of December 1998.

The Japanese government appointed Yoshinori Katori, press secretary at the Foreign Ministry, as ambassador to Israel on August 1, 2006. Katori previously served as minister to South Korea and director-general of the Consular Affairs Bureau before assuming the current post in August 2005. In September 2008, Katori ended his post to Israel and was replaced by ambassador Haruhisa Takeuchi, who presented his credentials on December 1, 2008.

In July 2006, Japan announced a plan for peace called "Corridor for Peace and Prosperity", which would be based on common economic development and effort by Israelis and Palestinians, rather than on continuous contention over land. Shimon Peres gave this idea much attention during his participation in an international conference in New York in September 2006 which was organized by former U.S. President Bill Clinton.

In July 2008, the Japanese government reiterated its support for the plan in meetings with Israelis and Palestinians, and urged the sides to continue working towards completion. Japan also indicated specific support for an agro-industrial park to be built near Jericho, and said it hopes to begin construction by 2009.

It was not until approximately 2014, when the governments of both respective countries pledged to each other to significantly upgrade the bilateral diplomatic and business ties between them. This rapid warming of relations is evidenced by the two countries entering into a number of important political and economic agreements – from a series of high-level dialogues on national security and cybersecurity to their first bilateral investment agreement – transforming their once limited bilateral relationship into one more characteristic of allied partners, a process that has been described as "rising sun relations" in Foreign Affairs magazine.

Since the mid-2010s, bilateral ties between Israel and Japan have strengthened significantly, creating enumerable mutual investments between the two nations. Japanese prime minister Shinzo Abe visited Israel twice – once in 2015 and a second time in 2018. In May 2014, Israeli Prime Minister Benjamin Netanyahu visited Japan.

In 2021, there were 1,156 Japanese citizens living in Israel and 589 Israelis living in Japan.

In 2024, Israel were not invited to Nagasaki's annual peace ceremony by the city's mayor Shiro Suzuki over "security risks and potential disruption".

In June 2025, Japan condemned Israeli strikes against Iran, calling them "completely unacceptable and deeply regrettable".

== Economy ==
Up until the 1990s, Japan was the sole industrialized East Asian nation that acquiesced most strongly to the Arab demands to boycott Israel. As a result, economic relations between Japan and Israel have been limited for much of the State of Israel's history.

Israeli exports to Japan, consisting primarily of polished diamonds, chemical products, machinery, electrical equipment, and citrus fruit are worth $810 million. Japanese exports to Israel, consisting primarily of motor vehicles, machinery, electrical equipment, and chemical products are collectively worth $1.3 billion.

Since the 2010s, trade between Israel and Japan have expanded considerably with economic relations between the two countries having increased significantly, particularly in the realm of high-technology, as well as the forging of partnerships between start-up companies and venture capitalists among the two nations. According to the Japan External Trade Organization (JETRO), 35 Japanese companies had subsidiaries in Israel by 2015 with as many as 50 by November 2016.

In 2021, data compiled by consulting firm Harel-Hertz shows a surge of $1.1 billion of Japanese investment in the Israeli high-technology industry. Total Japanese investment in Israel's high technology industry was $2.9 billion in 2021. Japanese investors accounted for 15.8% of all foreign investment in the Israeli economy. Total volume of trade is $3.574 billion.

As of 2022, Israel and Japan were negotiating a free trade deal. The move according to Times of Israel will help boost Japanese exports and make Japanese exports cheaper for Israeli consumers. About 90 Japanese companies worked in 2023 in Israel, triple the number in 2014.

In 2023, Israel and Japan signed a "Work-Holiday" agreement which allows citizens of either country to work for up to a year in the other country. This agreement came in part due to Japanese interest in Israel's high technology sector and in Israel's human talent. The agreement is aimed at citizens between the ages of 18 and 30. Direct flights between Tokyo and Tel Aviv commenced in 2023, operated by Israeli airline, El Al. Ambassador Gilad Cohen remarked following the signage of the agreement: "Israelis and Japanese [people] have never been closer. I am sure that our relations will continue to deepen and we will continue to collaborate for the benefit of the citizens of Israel and Japan."

== Defense ==
Israel and Japan signed in 2022 a defense cooperation deal, focused on equipment, defense technology and more. Japanese Defense Minister Yasukazu Hamada said the deal will help Japan advance a "free and open Indo-Pacific".

Following the Israeli invasion of the Gaza Strip and Gaza war, Japanese company Itochu Corporation announced in February 2024 that it will end its partnership with Israeli weapons manufacturer Elbit Systems by the end of February.

== Academic relations ==
Universities in both countries are making special efforts to conduct lively exchange of studies. In May 2012, a symposium to commemorate the sixtieth anniversary of the diplomatic relations was held at the Hebrew University of Jerusalem, to discuss issues of regional, bilateral, and cultural exchanges. The Israeli Association of Japanese Studies was also launched on that occasion.

== Public opinion ==
According to a 2025 Pew Research Center survey, 13% of people in Japan had a favorable view of Israel, while 79% had an unfavorable view; 10% had confidence in Israeli Prime Minister Benjamin Netanyahu, while 78% did not.

== Friendship leagues ==
- 1965 Japan-Israel Friendship Association
- 1984 Japan-Israel Parliamentary Friendship League
- 1996 Japan-Israel Chamber of Commerce

== Bilateral treaties and agreements ==
Year	Agreement
1971	Visa Exemption Arrangements
1993	Convention between Israel and Japan on "Avoidance of Double Taxation and the Prevention of Fiscal Evasion with Respect to Taxes on Income"
1994	Education and Culture Arrangements
1995	Agreement between the Government of Japan and the Government of the State of Israel on "Cooperation in Science and Technology"
2000	Agreement between the Israel and Japan regarding Air Services
2017	Agreement between Israel and Japan for Promotion, Protection and Liberalization of Investment

== Visits ==
Year	To Israel	To Japan
1985		Foreign Minister Yitzhak Shamir
1988	Foreign Minister Sousuke Uno	
1989		President Chaim Herzog, Foreign Minister Moshe Arens
1990		President Chaim Herzog
1991	Foreign Minister Taro Nakayama	
1992		Foreign Minister Shimon Peres
1994	Foreign Minister Koji Kakizawa, Special Envoy Kabun Muto	Prime Minister Yitzhak Rabin
1995	Prime Minister Tomiichi Murayama, Foreign Minister and Special Envoy Yohei Kono	
1996	Foreign Minister Yukihiko Ikeda	
1997		Foreign Minister David Levy, Prime Minister Benjamin Netanyahu
1999	Foreign Minister Masahiko Koumura, State Secretary for Foreign Affairs Nobutaka Machimura, Senior State Secretary for Foreign Affairs Shozo Azuma	Deputy Minister of Foreign Affairs Nawaf Massalha
2002	Foreign Minister Yoriko Kawaguchi	
2003	Foreign Minister Yoriko Kawaguchi	
2005	Foreign Minister Nobutaka Machimura	
2006	Prime Minister Junichiro Koizumi	
2008		Prime Minister Ehud Olmert
2013	Foreign Minister Fumio Kishida	
2014		Prime Minister Benjamin Netanyahu
2015	Prime Minister Shinzo Abe	
2018	Prime Minister Shinzo Abe	
2021	Foreign Minister Toshimitsu Motegi	
2023	Foreign Minister Yoko Kamikawa	
2025		Foreign Minister Gideon Sa'ar

== See also ==
- Foreign relations of Israel
- Foreign relations of Japan
- Antisemitism in Japan
- History of the Jews in Japan
- International recognition of Israel
- Japanese-Jewish common ancestry theory
- Lod Airport massacre
- Makuya
- Joseph Ivor Linton (first Israeli Minister in Japan)
