= List of ambassadors of Israel to Japan =

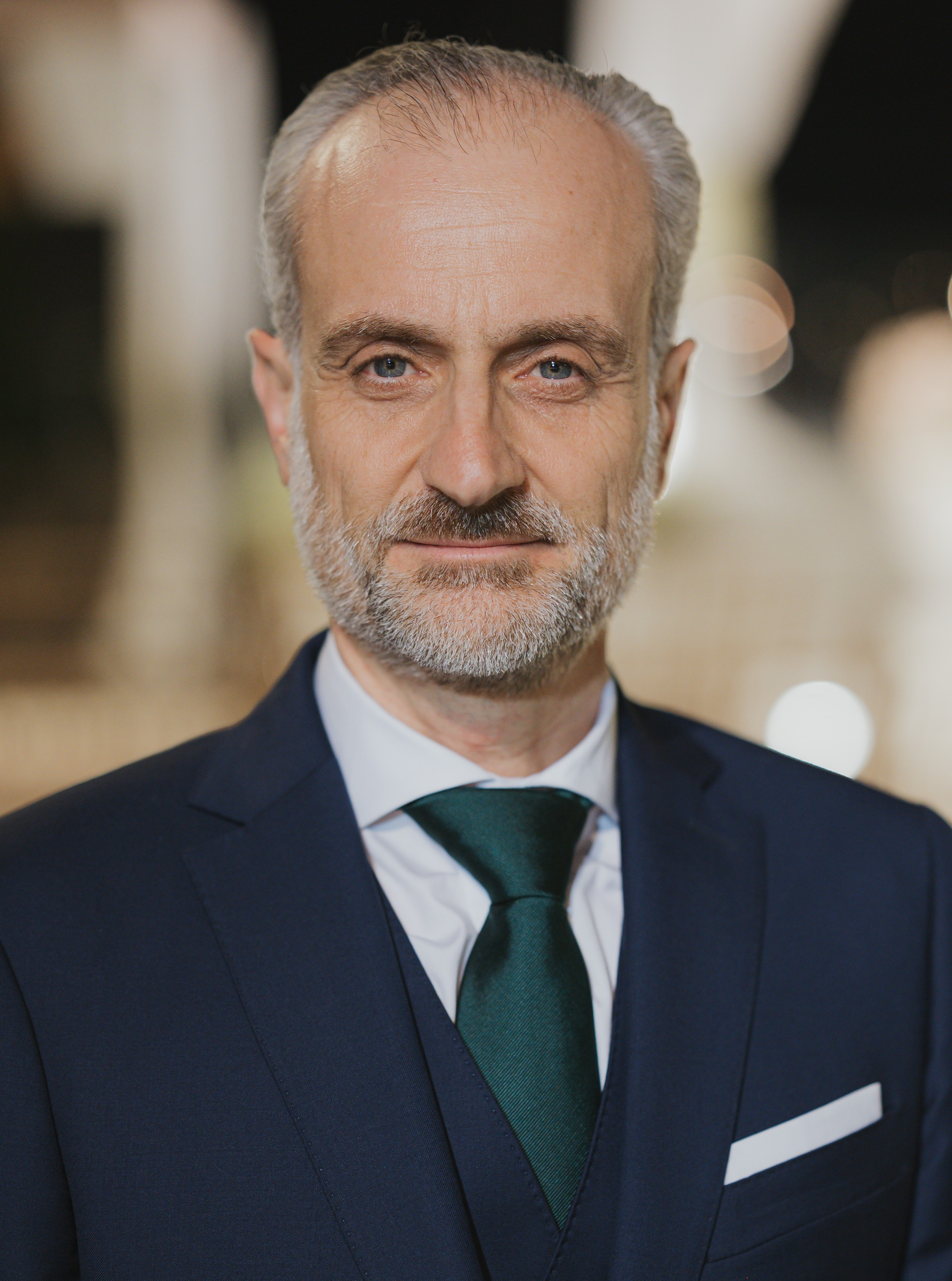
Current ambassador Dr. Emmanuel Navon

This is a list of Israel's ambassadors to Japan. The ambassadors are based in Tokyo.

== List of ambassadors ==
=== Ministers to Japan ===
- Joseph Linton (1952–1957)

=== Ambassadors to Japan ===
- Daniel Lewin (1960–1963)
- Mordechai Shneerson (1963–1966)
- Moshe Bartur (1966–1972)
- Shaul Ramati (1974–1977)
- Zvi Kedar (1978–1980)
- Amnon Ben-Yochanan (1980–1985)
- Yaacov Cohen (1985–1988)
- Nahum Eshkol
- Moshe Ben-Yaacov (1996–2000)
- Yitzhak Leor (2000–2003)
- Eli Cohen-Artzi (2004–2007)
- Nissim Ben-Shetrit (2007–2013)
- Ruth Kahanoff (2013–2017)
- Yaffa Ben-Ari (2017–2021)
- Gilad Cohen (2021–2026)
- Emmanuel Navon (2026–present), ambassador-designate
