= Opher Aviran =

Israeli diplomat

Opher Aviran (Hebrew: אופר אבירן) is a retired Israeli diplomat who served as the Consul General to Atlanta from 2010 until 2015. He was promoted to the rank of Ambassador after 31 years with the Ministry of Foreign Affairs in October 2014.

== Biography ==
Aviran earned a Bachelors of Arts degree in International Relations from the Hebrew University in Jerusalem and a Masters Degree in Political Science with a specialty in National Security Studies from the University of Haifa and National Defense College.

Previous posts include deputy ambassador in Rangoon, Burma, cultural and scientific affairs attache at the embassy in The Hague and deputy chief of mission at the embassy in Canberra, Australia.
