= List of ambassadors of Israel to Cambodia =

== List of ambassadors ==
- Orna Sagiv 2021–present
- Meir Shlomo (Non-Resident, Bangkok) 2017–2021
- Simon Roded
- Yael Rubinstein 2005–2009
- Shimon Avimor 1972–1975
- Emmanuel Galbar 1970–1972
- Rafael Benshalom 1967–1969
- Mordecai Kidron (Non-Resident, Bangkok) 1958–1963
