= David Darom =

Israeli photographer (1943–2021)

- דוד דרום
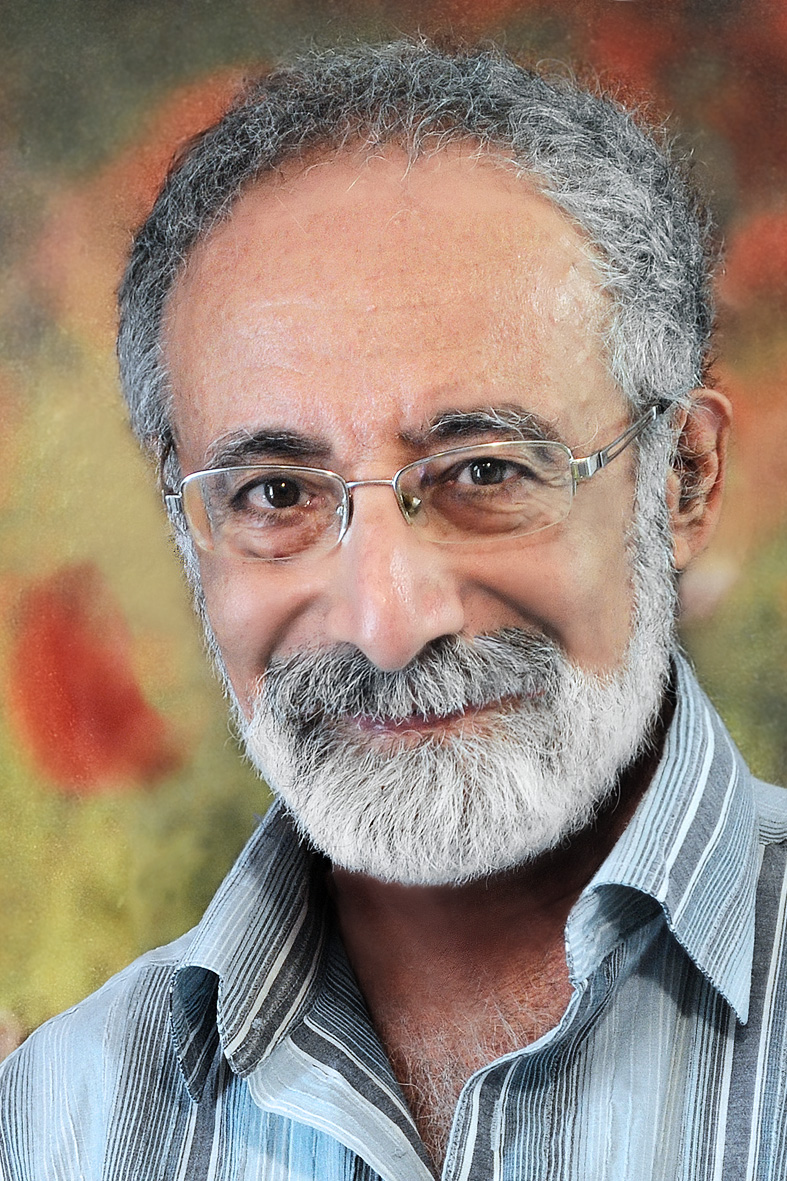
- Born: 1943; Bombay, India
- Scientific career
- Fields: Marine Biologist, Photographer

David Darom (Hebrew: דוד דרום; born 1943 in Bombay, India, died 28 April 2021 in Jerusalem, Israel), was an Israeli marine biologist and nature photographer. Until 2007, he was head of the Department of Scientific Photography at the Hebrew University of Jerusalem.

== Biography ==
David Darom was born in Bombay, India. His family immigrated to Israel in 1949 and settled in Jerusalem. In 1972, he received a PhD in Marine Biology.

== Nature photography career ==
Darom photographed the wildlife and wild flowers of Israel, with special attention to the documentation of the Plants of the Bible. Underwater he photographed hundreds of fish species as well as marine invertebrates from the Red Sea and the Mediterranean Sea. In 2001, Upeneus davidaromi, a species of goatfish found in the Red Sea, was named in his honour.

== Knife collecting ==
Darom was an avid collector of handmade (Custom) art knives. In 2002 he published a series of large format art books on the subject. In 2003, he published "Art and Design in Modern Custom Folding Knives", and in 2005, "Art and Design in Modern Custom Fixed-Blade Knives". In 2006 he published "The Art of Modern Custom Knifemaking" and in 2007 "Modern Custom Knives – The Great Collections". Several of these volumes have been translated into 5 languages.

In 2008 Darom published the first book in a new series "Custom Knifemakers of the World" with "Edmund Davidson, The Art of the Integral Knife". In 2009 Darom published the 2nd book in this series, "Tim Hancock, The Art of the Western Bladesmith" and a 3rd volume, "The Art Knives of Van Barnett & Dellana" was introduced in 2011.

In October 2010, Darom was awarded the Nate Posner Memorial Award by the Knifemakers' Guild at their annual meeting in Louisville, Kentucky (USA), recognizing his "Outstanding Service in the Promotion of Handcrafted Cutlery".

== Published books ==
=== Flora and fauna ===
- Darom D. (1976) "The Red Sea", Sadan Publishing House, pp 124, 105 u/w photographs (English +).
- Darom D., Fridman D., Levi E. (1977) "Coral World" A color guide, Sadan Publishing House, (English).
- Darom D., Baranes A. (1980) "The Shark", Massada Israel, pp 118, full color, Cat. No. 00-1505 (Hebrew).
- Plitman U., Heyn C., Danin A., Shmida A., photography: Darom D. (1983) "The Pictorial Color Guide to Wild Flowers Of Israel", Massada Israel, pp 342, 800 color photographs, Cat. No. 00-2506 (Hebrew).
- Darom D. (1984) "Life in the Red Sea", Massada Israel, pp 168, Cat. No. 00-1750 (Hebrew).
- Shmida A., Darom D. (1986) "Flowers of Jerusalem", Cana/ Carta, pp 250, full color OCLC 19238594 (Hebrew).
- Shmida A., Darom D. (1986) "The Photographic Color Guide to Wild Flowers of Israel" Part I, Keter, pp 308, Cat. No. 534522 (Hebrew).
- Shmida A., Darom D. (1987) "The Photographic Color Guide to Wild Flowers of Israel" Part II, Keter, pp 334, Cat. No. 535960 (Hebrew).
- Darom D. (1989) "The Color Guide to Nature Photography", Keter, pp 240, Cat. No. 536120 (Hebrew).
- Darom D. (1990), "Beautiful Plants of The Bible", Palphot Ltd, pp 48, ISBN 965-280-067-8 (English +).
- Shmida A., Darom D. (1991) "The Color Guide To Trees", Keter, pp 328, ISBN 965-07-0340-3 (Hebrew).
- Darom D., Tsurnamal M. (1992) "The Color Guide to the Seashores of Israel", Keter, pp 272, ISBN 965-07-0318-7 (Hebrew).
- Darom D. (1996) "Animals of the Bible" Palphot Ltd, pp 48, ISBN 965-280-106-2 (English +).
- Darom D. (1996) "Wildflower" Album format full color, Keter, pp 120, ISBN 965-07-0597-X (Hebrew).
- Golani D., Darom D. (1997) "Handbook of the Fish of Israel", Keter, full color, pp 270, ISBN 965-07-0668-2 (Hebrew).
- Golani D., Ozturk B., Basusta N., photography: Darom D. (2006) "Fishes of the Eastern Mediterranean", TUDAV, full color, pp 260, ISBN 975-8825-12-7 (English).

=== Knives ===
- Darom D. (2003) "Art and Design in Modern Custom Folding Knives", Saviolo Publisher, pp 256, ISBN 965-07-1174-0 (English +).
- Darom D. (2005) "Art and Design in Modern Custom Fixed-Blade Knives", Saviolo Publisher, pp 276, ISBN 965-07-1337-9 (English +).
- Darom D. (2006) "The Art of Modern Custom Knifemaking", Saviolo Publisher, pp 252, ISBN 965-90907-0-6 (English +).
- Darom D. (2007) "Modern Custom Knives The Great Collections", Saviolo Publisher, pp 288, ISBN 978-88-95125-04-6 (English +).
- Darom D. (2008) "Edmund Davidson The Art of the Integral Knife" Published by the author *, pp 144, ISBN 978-965-90907-1-6.
- Darom D. (2009) "Tim Hancock The Western Bladesmith", Published by the author, pp 152, ISBN 978-965-90907-2-3.
- Darom D. (2010) "The World of Art Knives", Published by the author, pp 272, ISBN 978-965-90907-3-0.
- Darom D. (2011) "The Art Knives of Van Barnett & Dellana" Published by the author, pp 152 full color, ISBN 978-965-90907-5-4.

== Gallery ==
=== Plants ===
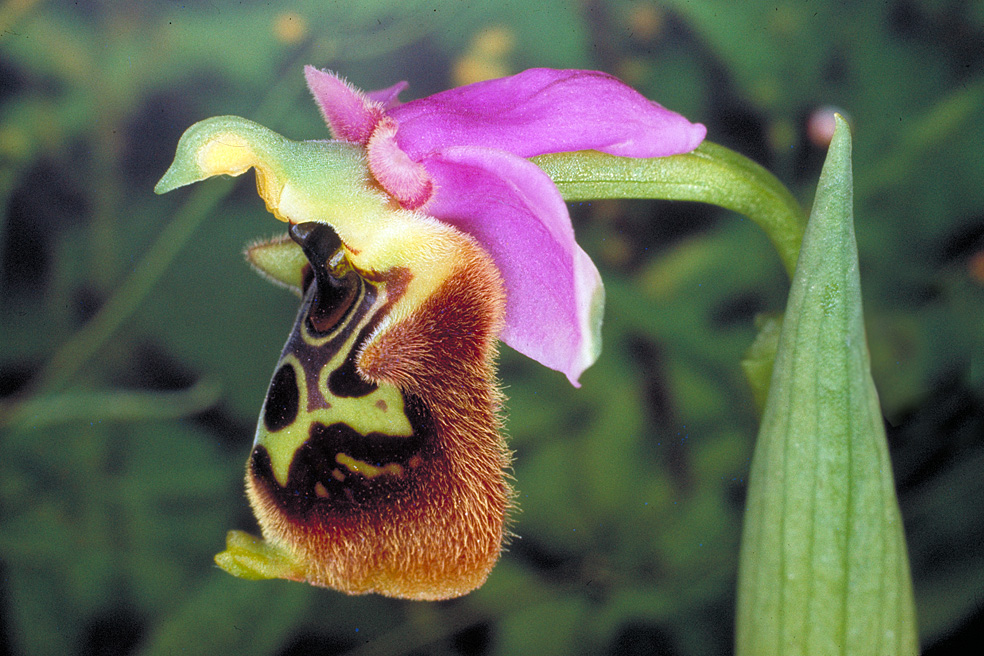
Ophrys holosericea

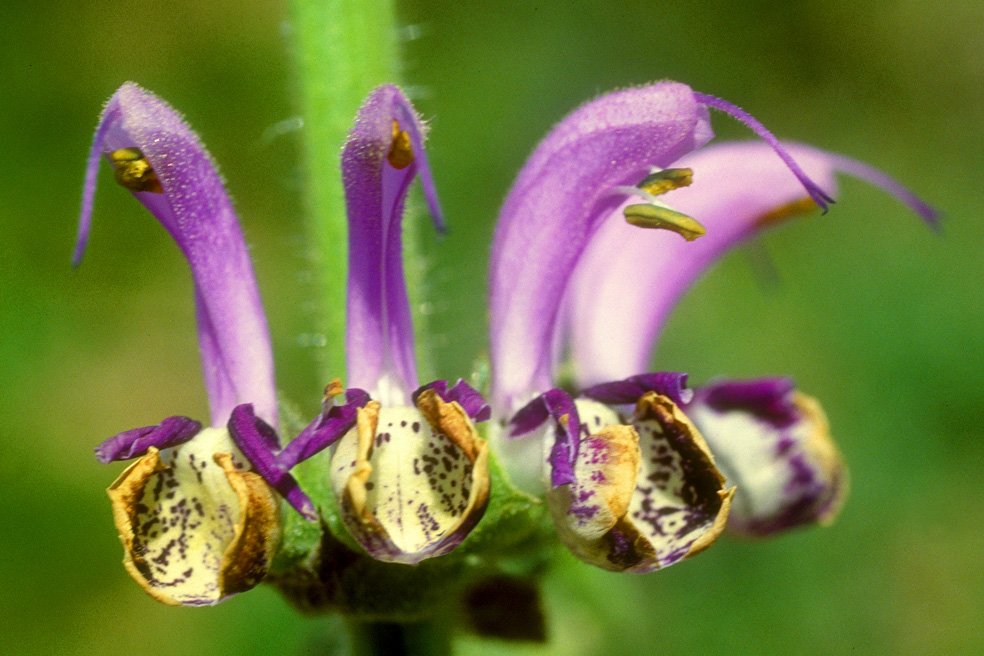
Salvia indica

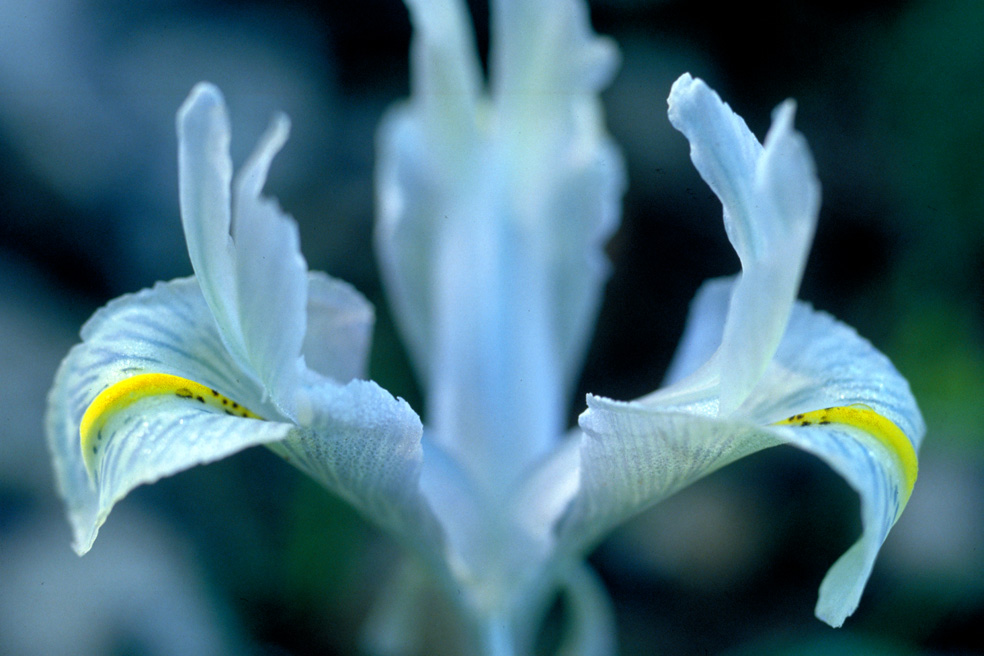
Iris palaestina

=== Marine fauna ===
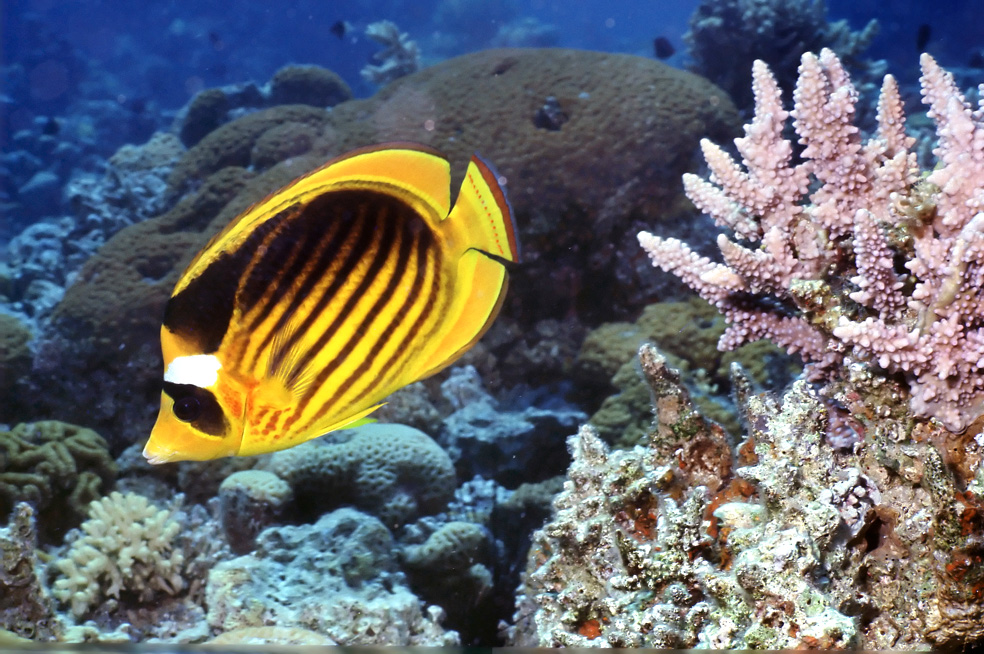
Diagonal butterflyfish

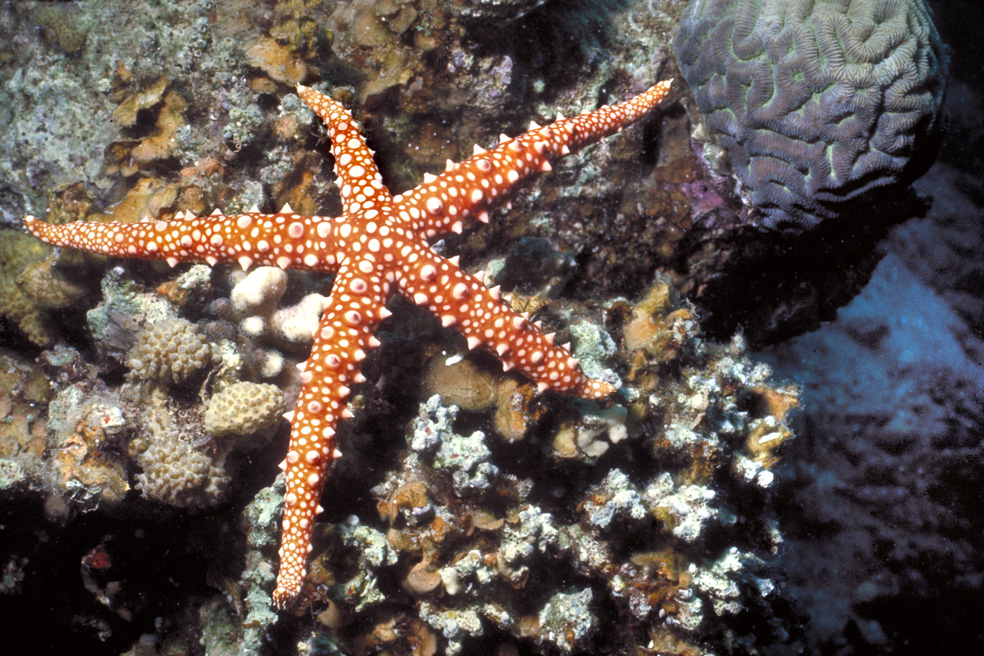
Gomophia egyptiaca

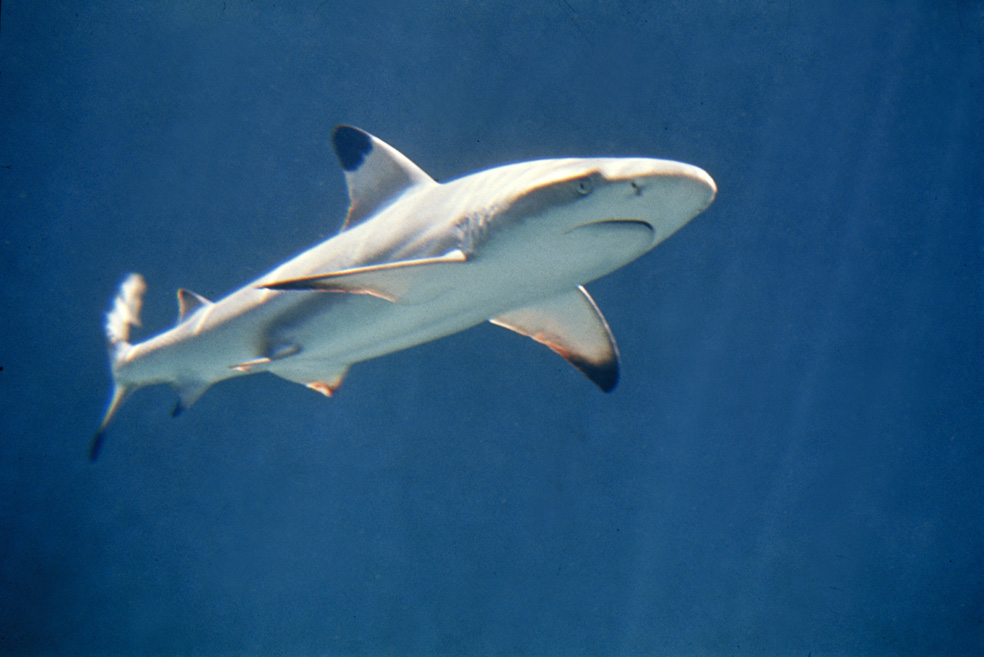
Blacktip reef shark
