= Tae Achiwa =

Thai activist

- เต้ อาชีวะ
- Born: Akkarawut Kraisrisombat; 1980 or 1981 (age 45–46)

Akkarawut Kraisrisombat (Thai: อัครวุธ ไกรศรีสมบัติ), commonly known as Tae Achiwa (Note: Other spellings include Te Acheewa, Tae Acheewa, and Tae Archeewa.) (Thai: เต้ อาชีวะ), is a Thai political activist and the chairman of Thai Mai Thon, an utra-royalist, nationalist political group.

== Early life and education ==
Tae attended a vocational school in Bang Na, Bangkok.

== Career ==
Tae told The Straits Times he formed the vigilante group Thai Mai Ton after witnessing a group of Burmese workers holding a meeting at a park in Bangkok and not allowing Thai citizens to enter the space in 2024.

Tae has an extensive social media presence and has posted numerous claims about Cambodians in Thailand, including that Cambodians are taking jobs from Thai citizens.

Tae has led several anti-immigrant protests in Thailand.

On 11 May 2025, Tae was identified along with social media influencer Kung Sor Por as attackers of two Cambodian men. According to the police report, Tae and Kung Sor Pro attacked the men at a mall in the Sam Rong area of Bangkok. Tae subsequently admitted the attack, claiming the men behaved rudely to Thai visitors at the mall.
