= Meir Shlomo =

Israeli diplomat

Meir Shlomo (Hebrew: מאיר שלמה; born 1954, Tel Aviv) is the Israeli Ambassador to Thailand with non-resident status in Cambodia. and was the Israeli Consul to both Houston (2010–2015) and New England (2002–2006).

== Biography ==
He was born and raised in Tel Aviv but his grandparents emigrated to Jerusalem in 1927 from Aden (later called the Democratic Republic of South Yemen).

Shlomo earned a Ph.D. in history and communication from the University of Paris VIII and a master's degree in mass communication from the Hebrew University of Jerusalem. He also has a bachelor's degree in political science from Tel Aviv University.
