= Brand Israel =

Israeli government public relations campaign

Brand Israel is a public relations campaign run by the Israeli government to improve the image of the State of Israel. The goal of the campaign is to establish Israel as a cosmopolitan, progressive, Westernized and democratic society, contrasting it with the Islamic, homophobic and repressive surrounding nations.

== History ==
The Brand Israel campaign is a joint project of Israel's Foreign Ministry, Tourism Ministry and Strategic Affairs Ministry.

Omar Barghouti, co-founder of Boycott, Divestment and Sanctions movement, argue that the Brand Israel campaign is designed explicitly to hide Israel's violations of human rights and international law under a guise of artistic and scientific glamour. Israel's efforts to rebrand itself began unofficially in 2003 at the initiative of American business people and media experts. One advertising executive suggested that Israel's bad reputation in the U.S. stemmed from a lack of knowledge about the state. At the same time, the Foreign Ministry set up a new hasbara department to promote Israel's achievements and positive activities. A brand survey from 2006 found that: "Israel is the worst brand in the world ... Israel's brand is by a considerable margin the most negative we have ever measured ... If Israel's intention is to promote itself as a desirable place to live and invest in, the challenge appears to be a steep one." 52% of respondents in a BBC survey from 2012 thought that Israel had a negative influence on the world and a 2003 Gallup poll among EU citizens found that Israel was seen as the biggest threat to world security. Israel has also, as a result of its policies against the Palestinians and the activities of the BDS movement, increasingly come to be associated with apartheid and war crimes. Rhys Crilley and Ilan Manor predicted that the right-wing government would worsen Israel's reputation.

The Brand Israel campaign was launched in 2005 and managed by Ido Aharoni at the Foreign Ministry. A conference was convened in Tel Aviv in 2007 which kicked off the campaign with a four million dollar budget awarded to the Foreign Ministry and an eleven million dollar awarded to the Tourism Ministry. In 2010, the Foreign Ministry allocated more than 26 million dollars in branding for the coming years.

Brand Israel's strategy is to use culture as the best form of propaganda and to promote Israeli culture overseas.

Artists and writers sign a contract to receive state funding as part of the campaign. The contract stipulates that: The service provider undertakes to act faithfully, responsibly and tirelessly to provide the Ministry with the highest professional services. The service provider is aware that the purpose of ordering services from him is to promote the policy interests of the State of Israel via culture and art, including contributing to creating a positive image for Israel. ...The service provider will not present himself as an agent, emissary and/or representative of the Ministry. ...The Ministry is entitled to terminate this contract, or a part thereof, immediately and at the Ministry’s sole discretion, if the service provider does not provide the Ministry with the services and/or does not fulfill his obligations under this contract ... and the service provider will make no claim, demand or suit based on the termination of the contract by the Ministry.

== Activities ==
A Brand Israel campaign in July 2007 showcased scantily clad female soldiers of the Israel Defense Forces in the American men's magazine Maxim. Under headlines such as "The Chosen Ones," Maxim approvingly described the women as "drop-dead gorgeous and can take apart an Uzi in seconds." The purpose was to show Israel in a context other than that of war.

In 2008, Brand Israel staged a $1 million campaign in the Greater Toronto Area. The campaign featured ads highlighting Israeli medical developments and technology, including testimonials from patients who had benefited from Israeli medical innovations. It specifically targeted Toronto's Asian communities. According to Israeli Consul General Amir Gissin, Toronto served as a test bed for the campaign. Brand Israel was also present on the 2009 edition of Toronto International Film Festival. Ken Loach, Jane Fonda, David Byrne, and John Greyson condemned the festival's cooperation with Brand Israel.

In 2010, Brand Israel launched "Out in Israel" in San Francisco, a month-long festival to showcase LGBT scene for Californians. As with the Maxim campaign, the stated aim was to show Israel in a context not related to politics or war. Another purpose was to counter negative perceptions stemming from the previous year's fatal gay centre shooting in Tel Aviv. Critics condemned it as a form of pinkwashing.

In 2016, 26 Oscar-nominated celebrities were offered 10-day trips to Israel funded by the Israeli government, among them Leonardo DiCaprio, Sylvester Stallone, Mark Rylance, Cate Blanchett, Jennifer Lawrence, Matt Damon, and Kate Winslet. The Israeli Tourism Minister said that the celebrities were "leading opinion-formers who we are interested in hosting" who would get the chance to "experience the country first-hand". According to media reports, the trip's value was about $55,000 each but Israeli officials said that it was only about $15,000 to $18,000. Pro-Palestinian activists urged the celebrities to refuse to take the gift bags. According to Catherine Rottenberg, not a single celebrity took advantage of the free trips.

The Round Tables Chef Series is an annual food festival in Tel Aviv sponsored by American Express in partnership with the Foreign Affairs Ministry which invites chefs from around the world. BDS activists have argued that Round Tables is part of the Brand Israel campaign to normalize its ongoing denial of Palestinian rights. In 2018 over 90 food industry professionals signed an open letter urging chefs to withdraw from the event.

== Related concepts ==
Crilley and Manor describes a branding strategy they call "un-nation branding" which they argue could serve as an alternative for Israeli entities. To avoid the state's tarnished reputation the entity downplay its associations with Israel.

== See also ==
- Homonationalism
- Femonationalism
- Pinkwashing
- Purplewashing
