= List of ambassadors of Israel to Serbia =

This is a list of Israel's ambassadors to Serbia and its predecessor countries. The ambassadors are based in Belgrade.

== List of ambassadors ==
Ministers to the Socialist Federal Republic of Yugoslavia

- 1951: Moshe Ishai
- 1954–1957: Arye Levavi
- 1957–1960: Avraham Darom
- 1961–1963: Aviezer Chelouche
- 1963–1965: Avraham Kidron
- 1965–1967: Avigdor Dagan

Ambassadors to the Federal Republic of Yugoslavia

- 2000–2003: Yoram Shani

Ambassadors to the State Union of Serbia and Montenegro

- 2003: Yoram Shani
- 2003–2006: Yaffa Ben-Ari

Ambassadors to the Republic of Serbia

- 2006–2007: Yaffa Ben-Ari
- 2007–2011: Arthur Koll
- 2011–2016: Yossi Avni-Levy
- 2016–2020: Alona Fisher-Kamm
- 2020–present: Yahel Vilan

== See also ==
- Israel–Serbia relations
- Foreign relations of Israel
