= Embassy of Israel, Bangkok =

- The Embassy of Israel in Bangkok
- Location: Bangkok Thailand
- Address: Ocean Tower II, 75 Sukhumvit Soi 19
- Coordinates: 13.74287°N 100.56135°E
- Ambassador: Alona Fisher-Kamm
- Website: embassies.gov.il/bangkok

The Embassy of Israel in Bangkok is the diplomatic mission of Israel in Thailand. The current ambassador of Israel to Thailand is Alona Fisher-Kamm, since 2025.

== History ==
=== 1972 hostage crisis ===
On 28 December 1972, 4 armed members of the pro-Palestinian "Black September" guerrilla movement seized the embassy and threatened to kill the 6 Israelis inside, and to blow up the building. On 29 December 1972, the attackers surrendered and released the hostages.

=== 2026 protests ===
On 10 September 2026, hundreds of demonstrators protested outside of the Embassy in Bangkok, led activist Sondhi Limthongkul. Rabbi Yehuda Kaploun, an American and Israeli dual citizen serving as the United States Special Envoy to Monitor and Combat Antisemitism, said on X he was "deeply concerned by rising anti-Semitic rhetoric in Thailand."

== See also ==
- Israelis in Thailand
