= List of ambassadors of Israel to South Korea =

Ambassador of Israel to South Korea
- 주한 이스라엘 대사
- Emblem of Israel

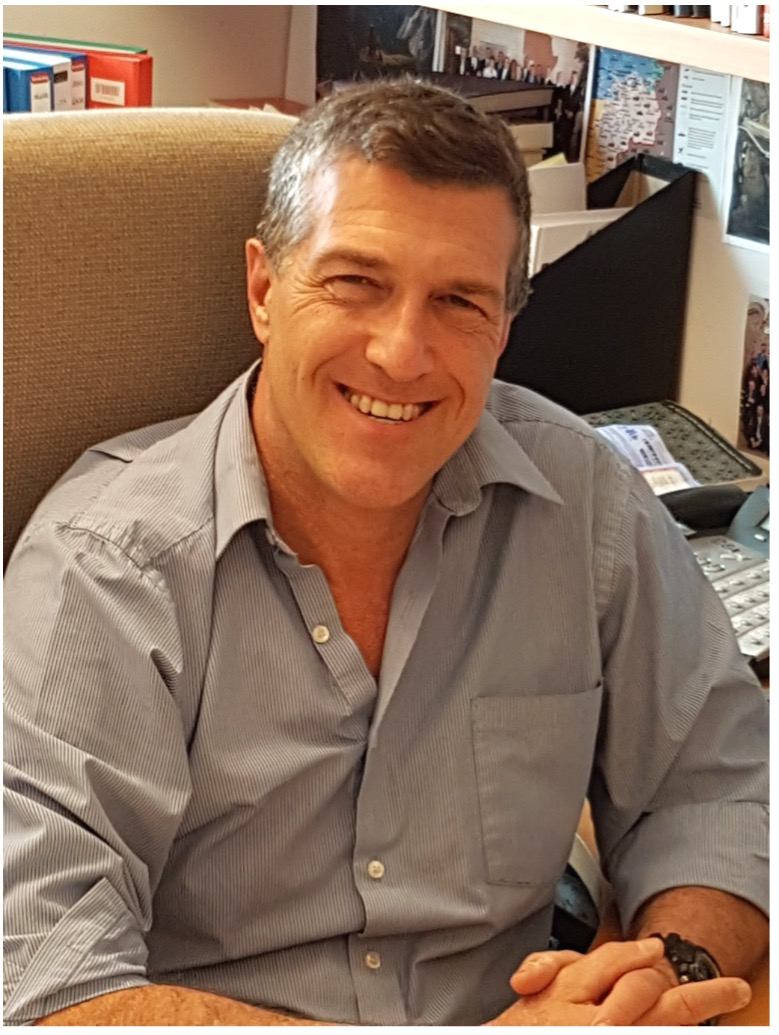
- Incumbent; Akiva Tor since 2020
- Inaugural holder: Yehuda Horam
- Formation: August 1969; 57 years ago

The ambassador of Israel to South Korea is the representative of the State of Israel in the Republic of Korea, commonly known as South Korea.

== List of ambassadors ==
- 1962-1963: Daniel Lewin (Non-Resident, Tokyo)
- 1963-1966: Mordekhai Shneeron (Non-Resident, Tokyo)
- 1969-1973: Yehuda Horam
- 1973-1977: Amnon Ben-Yochanan
- 1977-1978: Emmanuel Ron
- 1978-1980: Zvi Kedar (Non-Resident, Tokyo)
- 1992-1995: Asher Naim
- 1995-2000: Arie Arazi
- 2001-2005: Uzi Manor
- 2005-2009: Yigal Baruch Caspi
- 2009-2013: Tuvia Israeli
- 2013-2016: Uri Gutman
- 2016-2020: Chaim Choshen
- 2020-present: Akiva Tor
