= Orna Sagiv =

Israeli diplomat

Orna Sagiv (Hebrew: אורנה שגיב) is an Israeli diplomat who has served as Ambassador to Thailand and non-resident ambassador to Cambodia since 2021 and Consul General to Mumbai (2008–2013). Before she served as Ambassador to Thailand, she was Charge d’Affaires ad interim. She has also served as ambassador to Australia and New Zealand.

== Biography ==
Sagiv was born and raised in Kfar Saba. She completed her undergraduate work at Bar-Ilan University with majors in political science and criminology.
