= Asaf Shariv =

Israeli diplomat

- אסף שריב

Consul General
- In office August 2007 – 2010
- Preceded by: Arye Mekel
- Succeeded by: Ido Aharoni

Personal details
- Born: April 6, 1972 (age 54)
- Education: Interdisciplinary Center Ηerzliya
- Occupation: Diplomat

Asaf Shariv (Hebrew: אסף שריב; born April 6, 1972) was Israel’s Consul General in New York from August 2007 until 2010. He is the youngest diplomat to date that has ever been designated this position. Prior to his appointment, Shariv was the Director of Media and Public Affairs to Prime Ministers Ehud Olmert and Ariel Sharon, where his responsibilities included supervising the Government’s Press Office and Advertising Bureau. He was also the spokesman for various government agencies, such as the Institute for Intelligence and Special Operations (Mossad), the Atomic Energy Committee, the National Security Committee and the Counter-Terrorism Unit.

In 2002, when Shariv joined the Prime Minister’s Office as Senior Advisor to Ariel Sharon’s Chief-of-Staff, he sat on the Prime Minister’s committee that discussed strategic issues with the American government, and was instrumental in formalizing the MOU between Israel and the United States regarding the Road Map for Peace. He was also a member of the special task force that dealt with issues such as the route of the security fence, the disengagement from Gaza and the U.S. guarantees on Israeli bonds.

== Biography ==
Consul General Shariv got his start in Public Affairs in 1990, as a soldier in the IDF, during which time he was a reporter and senior editor for the weekly BaMachane, the official newspaper of the Israeli military. In 1993, Mr. Shariv was promoted to Acting Editor-in-Chief of BaMachane. From 1994–1995, he worked as a deputy editor at Globes newspaper.

== Education ==
In 1997, he earned a degree in law from The Interdisciplinary Center of Israel, and until 2002 practiced as an attorney at the Tel-Aviv firm of Weissglass-Almagor.
