= Yosef Chaim Kantor =

Formerly Chief Rabbi of Thailand

Yosef Chaim Kantor is an American and formerly Thai religious leader serving as the Chief Rabbi of Thailand. Kantor has led Chabad of Thailand since 1993.

== Career ==
Kantor moved to Thailand in 1993 with his wife and eldest daughter and became a Thai citizen in 2013.

In October 2026, Thai prime minister Anutin Charnvirakul issued an order revoking Kantor's Thai citizenship, citing a Department of Special Investigation (DSI) report showing Kantor's continued use of his United States passport as a travel document on 16 occasions to Australia. The DSI and Thailand's Interior Ministry subsequently opened an investigation into Kantor's descendants along with 19 companies linked to him.

== Personal life ==
Kantor has 8 children.
