= Ido Aharoni =

Israeli diplomat

Ido Aharoni Aronoff
- עידו אהרוני ארונוף
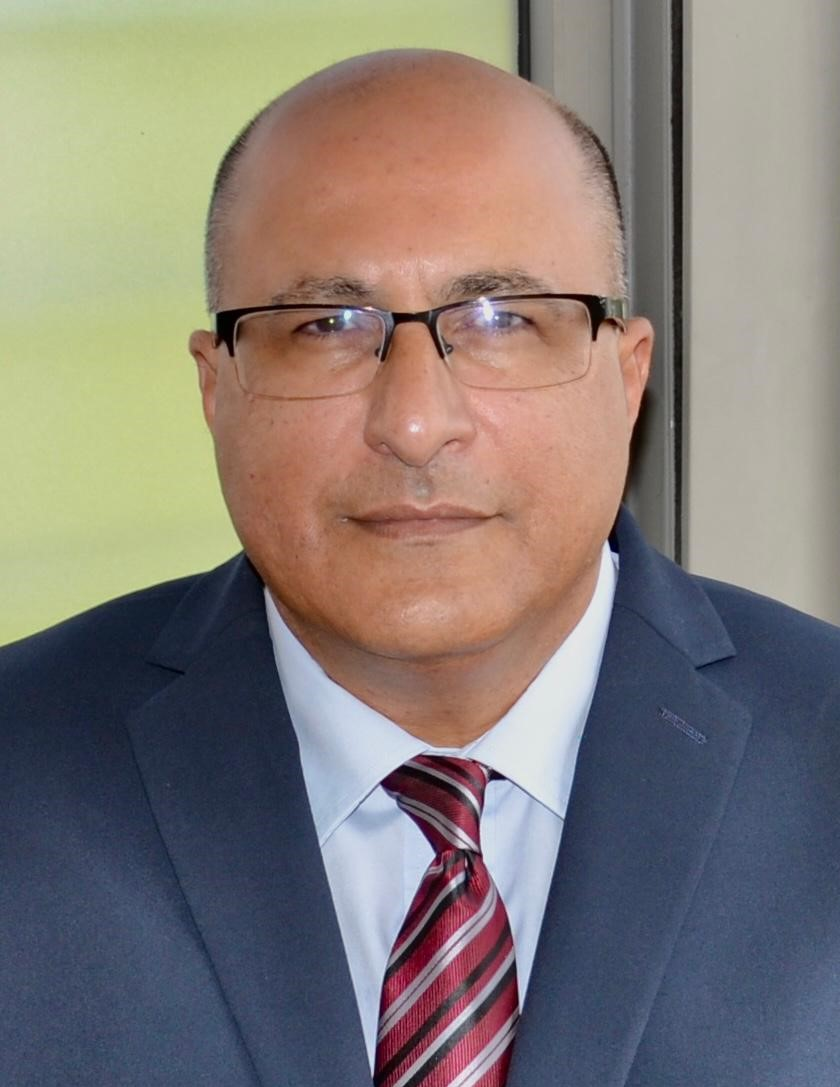

Ambassador, Consul General of Israel in New York, and the Tri-State Area
- In office August 23, 2010 – August 1, 2016
- Preceded by: Asaf Shariv
- Succeeded by: Dani Dayan

Personal details
- Born: 21 August 1962 (age 64) Tel Aviv, Israel
- Spouse: Julie Goodman (since 1985)
- Children: 3
- Education: Tel Aviv University (BA), Emerson College (MA)

Ido Aharoni Aronoff (Hebrew: עידו אהרוני ארונוף; born 21 August 1962) is an Israeli career diplomat, advisor to international companies, public speaker and university lecturer, writer and investor. He was born in Jaffa (Tel Aviv), Israel. Aharoni spent his entire diplomatic career in the United States. He is a 25-year veteran of Israel's Foreign service. He is a public diplomacy specialist, founder of the Brand Israel Program, and a place positioning practitioner. Aharoni has served as a member of the Board Governors of Tel Aviv University and its cabinet since 2015 and as a lecturer at the university's Coller School of Management since 2018 and is the host of TAU Unbound, the official English language podcast of Tel Aviv University. In April 2024, Aharoni, was appointed a Global Distinguished Professor of Business at Touro University and in August 2024 he was appointed as a Visiting Professorship at San Diego State University (SDSU) School of Business and University of California San Diego (UCSD) School of Global Policy. He is the co-founder and Global Ambassador for the Genius 100 Visions community and serves as a consultant to international companies such as MasterCard APCO Worldwide, The Libra Group, Bank Leumi USA and Value Base, He is a co-founder of Israel-based consultancy Emerson Rigby Ltd. and of British-Israeli investment company EA2K.

== Early life ==
Ido Aharoni Aronoff was born in Tel Aviv in 1962 and raised in Holon. He attended CH.N. Bialik Elementary School and H. Kugel High School, both in Holon. His mother, Ahuva Aharoni (née Madar), was a kindergarten teacher. She was born in Tel Aviv in 1932. Her Parents came from Yemen in 1912 and settled in the Yemenite section of Tel Aviv known as Kerem HaTeimanim, and later moved to Hatikva neighborhood of Tel Aviv where Aharoni spent significant time with his grandparents.:

His father, Emanuel Aharoni Aronoff, was a scholar, author, expert on the country's geography, lecturer and one of the early environmentalists in Israel. He was of Bukharan family and was born in Mersin, Turkey in 1926 to Rabbi Avraham Aronoff (b. 1888) and his wife Hanna Aronoff (ne’e Yohananoff). Aharoni's great-grandfather, Rabbi Emanuel Aronoff, settled in Jerusalem in 1874 and was one of the founders of the Bukharan Quarter. He was known as the “first Bukharan to move to Jerusalem by foot”. Aharoni's father was a member of the Haganah and participated in the 1948 War of Independence where he was injured twice in battle. In 2001 he was given the Honorary Citizen Award by the City of Holon.

== Education ==
Aharoni obtained a Bachelor of Arts degree from Tel Aviv University with a joint-major in Film and Television, Sociology and Anthropology. In 1990, he earned a master's degree in Mass Communications from Emerson College in Boston. In 1993 Aharoni attended the Hebrew University special program for foreign service cadets in Government and Diplomacy.

== Diplomatic career ==
Aharoni was a member of Israel's Foreign Service from 1991 to 2016 and held positions in Los Angeles and New York. He was Israel's longest-serving Consul-General in New York and the Tri-State Area, from 2010 to 2016, where he oversaw Israel's largest diplomatic mission worldwide.

Prior to his arrival in New York, Aharoni served as a policy advisor to the Director-General of the Ministry of Foreign Affairs in Jerusalem.:

In the Spring of 2006, he became Senior Advisor and Press Secretary to Israel's Foreign Minister and Deputy Prime Minister. In that capacity, he introduced nation branding methods and country positioning strategies as pillars of Israel's public diplomacy.

From 1994 to 1998, Aharoni served as Israel's Consul for Communications and Public Affairs in Los Angeles, working extensively with the entertainment industry and top American markets (Greater Los Angeles, San Diego, Las Vegas, Phoenix, Tucson, Salt Lake City and Denver.):

In 1993, Aharoni served under then-Foreign Minister Shimon Peres, as policy advisor to Israel's chief negotiator with the Palestinians, in which capacity he took part in back-channel negotiations in Europe and the Middle East. This led to the signing of The Declaration of Principles and the Mutual Recognition Agreement, known as the Oslo Accords. Aharoni was a member of the Israel's delegation to the White House.

=== Brand Israel ===
In 2002, Aharoni initiated the Brand Israel program after meeting with advertising executive David Sable, then with Wunderman, and introduced him to the general concept of place branding. Aharoni facilitated the inclusion of Israel in the Brand Asset Valuator (BAV), the world's largest brand database maintained by Young and Rubicam (now VMLYR), thus launching Israel's national branding program.

In 2002–2003, Aharoni convened the Brand Israel Group in New York, an independent group of marketing and branding specialists. Their work laid the foundation for the official Brand Israel Program, which was subsequently launched by the Foreign Minister in October 2006. In 2018, Harvard Business School published a case study report on Israel's place positioning based on the initiative's.

In 2007, Aharoni was appointed as Israel's first Head of Brand Management team, designed to enhance Israel's positioning in various areas, including tourism, investment, commerce, culture, political, and reputation management. The program aimed to showcase Israel's global relevance by leveraging its advantages.

In 2015, Aharoni presented the idea of creating a global index to rank countries as brands, to publisher Mort Zuckerman and then to advertising executive David Sable, then the CEO of Y&R. This introduction resulted in partnership that produced the Best Countries Index by U.S. News & World Report. The data is collected by BAV (Brand Asset Valuator) and analyzed and presented by U.S. News & World Report. This venture was later joined by Wharton School of Business and unveiled in Davos, Switzerland, at the World Economic Forum of 2016

=== Brand Albert Einstein ===
In 2007 Aharoni presented the Brand Israel plan to Israel's government, including an entire section devoted to Albert Einstein, aiming to connect Brand Israel to creativity and innovation. The plan included the creation of the Albert Einstein National Hall in Jerusalem. In 2017, Aharoni recruited art collector Jose Mugrabi to implement the idea. Mugrabi committed all the resources to the creation of the museum and then commissioned architect Daniel Libeskind to design the 64M NIS building. In June 2023 Jose and Marie Mugrabi broke ground in Jerusalem. The Albert Einstein House is expected to open in 2025.

== Career ==
Since September 2016 he has been a Global Distinguished Professor of International Relations at New York University's in the Graduate School of Arts and Sciences. His publications are listed on Google scholar

Aharoni is an active public speaker, having delivered numerous lectures on the Middle East affairs, nation branding and other public matters at institutions in Israel and the US, including Carnegie Mellon University (2007), the Interdisciplinary Center Herzliya (2010), Barnard College (2012), Emerson College (2012), San Diego State University (2012), Colgate University (2013), Duke University’s Fuqua School of Business (2013), Haas School of Business at UC Berkeley (2013), Boston University (2014), University of Haifa (2014), University of Tulsa (2014), Wharton Business School (2015), Yale School of Management (2015), Johnson School of Management at Cornell University (2016), Columbia Law School (2016), Florida Atlantic University (2018), Stony Brook University (2019), and many others.

Aharoni has frequently been invited as an analyst and article author in US and Israeli news media and newspapers, mainly covering Israel's international affairs and nation branding. In 2013, he was invited by Google to take part in their speakers’ series Talks at Google. He has been a public advocate to the branding of Israel by increasing the visibility of its better perceived traits (diversity, democracy, agriculture, science, high technology, history and culture) rather than by the more demanding attempting to improve the public's understanding and complexity of its international conflicts and related policies.

Since 2015, he has been member of the Board of Governors (and the global campaign cabinet) at Tel Aviv University. He was a facilitator to a ten million dollar gift by Hollywood producer and NFL owner Steve Tish to Tel Aviv University's Department of Film and Television.

In 2016 Aharoni became Global Ambassador of Maccabi World Union, a Jewish sporting organization. In 2017 Aharoni became Ambassador for the Genius 100 Vision Foundation, which he helped establish in the spirit of Albert Einstein. In 2018 Aharoni became the Chairman of the Charney Forum for New Diplomacy, the forum is academically affiliated with the University of Haifa and focused on training the new generations on advanced practices of diplomacy. In 2021 Aharoni became Chairman of GMFF, an Israeli film and TV fund dedicated to multiculturalism.[X] He is also a member of the advisory bodies of companies APCO Worldwide, and Value Base.

Published interviews to Aharoni on his subjects of expertise can be readily found online.

== Honors ==
In 1998, Aharoni was given the Community Leadership Award in Los Angeles by the American Friends of the Rabin Medical Center. In 2005, a communications studies scholarship, ‘Wings of Hope,’ was named after him by the Yemenite-Jewish Federation of North America. In 2013, Algemeiner Journal named him among the ‘Top 100 People Positively Influencing Jewish Life,’ commonly known as the Jewish 100. In 2015 he was designated Honorary Governor by Tel Aviv University. In 2016, New York City Mayor Bill de Blasio announced July 29, 2016, as “Ambassador Ido Aharoni Day” in New York while expressing: I don't know anyone who's done more to bond New York City and Israel, and the people of the United States and Israel. In 2019, he was selected by Hello Israel TV as one of the “Global Jewish 100”, recognizing his contributions as an Israeli diplomat.

== Military Service ==
Aharoni served in the Israel Defense Forces as an infantry company commander during the first Lebanon War.
