= Rafael Harpaz =

Israeli diplomat

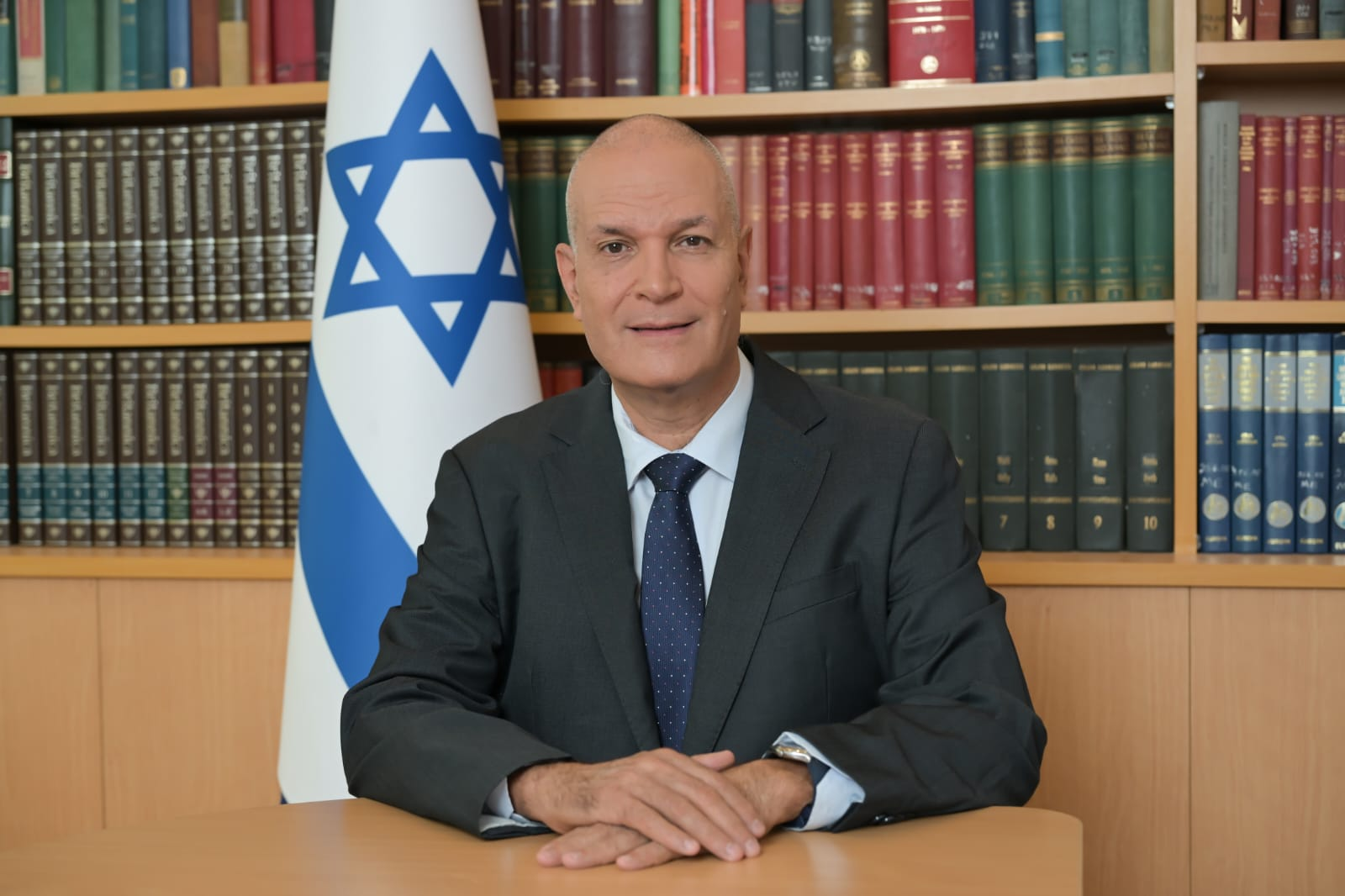

Israel Ambassador to South Korea
- Incumbent
- Assumed office September 2024

Personal details
- Born: 8 January 1962 (age 64) Jerusalem, Israel
- Education: Tel Aviv University and Hebrew University of Jerusalem

Rafael Harpaz (Hebrew: רפאל הרפז) (born January 8, 1962) is an Israeli diplomat in the Israeli Foreign Service.

Since September 2024 Harpaz is serving as Israel's ambassador to the Republic of Korea. From September 2021 until August 2024 Harpaz was serving as Deputy Director General for Asia and the Pacific at Israel Ministry for Foreign Affairs. From 2018 to 2021 Harpaz served as the Israeli ambassador to the Philippines. From 2012 to 2015, he served as the Israeli Ambassador to Azerbaijan.

== Biography ==
Rafael Harpaz was born in Jerusalem. As a child, he lived for one year in Milan, Italy, where his family was in a mission at the Jewish community.

Harpaz's father, Nissan Harpaz, was the Secretary General of the Histadrut Trade Union in Jerusalem and won the prestigious honor of the city of Jerusalem for his activities in the field of education. His father also served as a member of the Jerusalem City Council.

On June 7, 1967, the day of the liberation of the Western Wall by Israel during the Six-Day War, his father, being a reserve education officer, brought the first Torah scroll to the Wall. There is a street named after his father in Jerusalem. His father's family was originally from Poland and Belarus.

Harpaz's mother, Rachel Harpaz (maiden name Avisar) was a piano teacher, painter, writer and poet. Her family originated from Iraq and Russia.

Harpaz grew up in the Beit HaKerem neighbourhood of Jerusalem and was a member and councilor of the Scout Movement. Harpaz attended Beit HaKerem Elementary School in Jerusalem (1968–1976). He studied at the Boyar High School in Jerusalem (1976–1980). He served in the Israel Defense Forces from 1980 to 1983.Harpaz graduated from the Department of International Relations at Hebrew University in 1987 with a B.A. degree in international relations. From 1987 to 1989, Harpaz participated in the Bank Hapoalim Management Training Course. Harpaz studied in the academic course of the Rothschild Foundation at Hebrew University in 1991 during a special semester dedicated to the Israeli Ministry of Foreign Affairs cadets. In 2004, he attended a senior course at the Near East South Asia (NESA) Center of the National Defense University (NDU) in Washington, D.C., United States.Harpaz obtained an M.A. Degree in 2017 in the Executive Program on Diplomacy and Security Studies at Tel Aviv University with distinction.

Harpaz worked for the Education Center of the Youth and Hechalutz Department of the World Zionist Organization and served as a counselor at the Year Course program of the Young Judaea movement in the United States. In addition, he worked as a counselor at Jewish summer camps in Toronto, Canada and Hartford, Connecticut, United States.

Harpaz is married to Shulamit (née Moshel) and is the father of three children: Assaf, Yoav, and Gil.

== Public service and diplomatic career ==
In 1987, he served as the assistant to the Chairman of the Jerusalem Trade Association. From 1987 to 1989, he participated in the Bank Hapoalim management training course. In 1989, he was admitted to the Foreign Ministry cadet course and, upon completion, joined the Israeli Foreign Service. He served as the Deputy Chief of Mission of the Israeli Embassy in Abidjan, Ivory Coast (1991–1993).

=== Switzerland ===
Harpaz served as the Deputy Chief of Mission in Bern, Switzerland (1993–1997).

He coordinated the efforts of the Embassy regarding the assets held by Swiss banks that belonged to Holocaust victims as well as the commemoration of the 100th anniversary of the First Zionist Congress in Basel (1997).

Harpaz also coordinated the efforts of the Israeli government to obtain from the Swiss National Archive the names of Jewish refugees whose entry into the country was denied during WWII.

=== Sweden ===
Harpaz served as the Deputy Chief of Mission in Stockholm, Sweden (1999–2003).

He coordinated Prime Minister Ehud Barak's visit to Sweden (January 2000) for the first meeting of the International Holocaust Forum. It was the first visit of an Israeli Prime Minister to Sweden in 38 years.

In December 2002, as the chargé d'affaires of the Israeli Embassy while in Sweden, Harpaz served as the official escort at the Nobel Prize ceremony of Israeli-American Professor and Nobel Prize laureate for Economy Daniel Kahneman. The ceremony took place in the Stockholm City Hall.

=== Washington, D.C. ===
Harpaz served at the Israeli Embassy in Washington, D.C. as the minister for public diplomacy and was in charge of the bilateral relations between Israel and the states of Maryland and Virginia, as well as the District of Columbia (2005–2009).

He coordinated Israel's 60th Independence Day Celebration (2008), the highlight of which was the event at Washington National Mall attended by approximately 70,000 people.

=== Ambassador to Azerbaijan ===
Harpaz served as the Israeli ambassador to Azerbaijan from 2012 to 2015. He presented his credentials to the President of Azerbaijan Ilham Aliyev on September 5, 2012.

He accompanied Azerbaijani Foreign Minister Elmar Mammadyarov on a visit to Israel in 2013. This was the first official visit of an Azerbaijaini foreign minister to Israel since the establishment of diplomatic relations in 1993. He signed an agreement in September 2013 on health cooperation between Azerbaijan and Israel's International Development Cooperation Agency MASHAV. He coordinated the visit of Israel's foreign minister Avigdor Lieberman to Baku in 2014. In media interviews, he defined Israel-Azerbaijan relations as "strategic relations", with cooperation in many areas. He coordinated the visit of Israeli defense minister Moshe Yaalon to Azerbaijan, the first such visit ever, in September 2014. He toured the United States, accompanied by Azerbaijan's ambassador to the U.S. Elin Suleymanov at the end of September 2014. The tour included meetings and lectures with government officials, members of Congress, organizations, media, and Jewish communities in Washington D.C., Philadelphia, and New York. The joint tour of the two ambassadors was coordinated by the American Jewish Committee (AJC).

He signed the visa waiver agreement for holders of official passports between the two countries in December 2014.

=== Ambassador to the Philippines ===
In November 2017, Harpaz was appointed as the Israeli Ambassador to the Philippines.

He presented his credentials to the president of the Philippines, Rodrigo Duterte, on August 31, 2018.

Immediately after the credentials ceremony, he accompanied President Duterte during his September 2018 visit to Israel. It was the first visit by a sitting Filipino President to Israel. During the visit, Harpaz accompanied President Duterte in his meetings with President Reuben Rivlin and Prime Minister Benjamin Netanyahu.

In July 2019, Harpaz signed a framework agreement of cooperation between the Department of Agriculture of the Philippines and Israel's International Development Cooperation Agency, MASHAV. According to the Philippine Department of Agriculture, the implementing arrangement was intended to support cooperation using Israeli technologies and expertise in areas including modern dairy farms and irrigation systems.

On August 19, 2019, Harpaz was the keynote speaker at the annual celebration of former President Manuel Quezon's birthday. President Quezon is known as the one who opened the doors of the Philippines to Jewish refugees during the Holocaust. Approximately 1,300 Jews took refuge in the Philippines during World War II. During the war, President Quezon opened his house in the city of Marikina to the Jewish refugees who came to the Philippines. In recognition of this, Harpaz, together with Marikina Mayor Marcelino Teodoro, planted six trees at the site of President Quezon's home on September 25, 2019, to commemorate the six million Holocaust victims.

On June 2, 2020, Harpaz delivered an Israeli donation of medical supplies to the Philippine government to help combat the coronavirus. An official turnover ceremony was held at the Philippine Air Force headquarters attended by Defense Secretary Delfin Lorenzana.

=== Ambassador to the Republic of Korea ===
Harpaz has served as Israel’s ambassador to South Korea since September 2024. He presented his credentials to the president of Korea Yoon Suk Yeol on October 28, 2024. He visited the National 18.5 Cemetery in Buk-gu, Gwangju on November 28, 2024 to lay a wreath in honor of the Korean citizens that lost there life in the struggle for democracy.

Harpaz was followed and attacked by anti-Israel protestors on April 23, 2025 while having dinner with his family at a restaurant in Seoul. The Israeli embassy to South Korea condemned the attack in a statement, and thanked the many Koreans who expressed support. He attended and spoke at the opening of South Korea’s first dedicated Holocaust Museum in Paju on May 19, 2025. The event, led by the Korea Israel Bible Institute (KIBI), marked a significant milestone in Holocaust education and remembrance in the region. He emphasized in his speech that Holocaust remembrance isn’t optional, but a moral imperative. “Never again” must transition from slogan to actionable promise. In addition he warned against denial and distortion, stating that confronting these threats is essential to preserving justice, memory, and human dignity

== Awards and recognition ==
President Rodrigo Duterte conferred the Order of Sikatuna with Rank of Datu (Grand Cross) Silver Distinction on outgoing Ambassador of Israel to the Philippines Rafael Harpaz during his farewell call on the President at the Malacanang Palace on June 16, 2021. The award is a diplomatic merit for his exceptional and meritorious services to the Republic of the Philippines and tireless work in advancing cooperation between Israel and the Philippines in the areas of defense, business and innovation, agriculture, and labor migration. The Order of Sikatuna is an award given by the Republic of the Philippines to heads of state, diplomats and public figures for their unique contribution in promoting and strengthening relations between their country and the Philippines. Among the recipients of this award are US President Barack Obama, Japanese Emperor Hirohito, Hillary Clinton, Greek President Stefanopoulos, and more.
