= Thai Mai Thon =

Nationalist movement in Thailand

Thai Mai Thon (Thai: ไทยไม่ทน; ทมท; TMT), also known in English as the Impatient Thais, Thais Won't Tolerate It Group or Thai Intolerance Team is the name of a series of Thai political movements.

The first iteration of Thai Mai Thon was formed by former Red Shirts leader Jatuporn Prompan, and led protests campaigning for the resignation of Prayut Chan-o-Cha and focused on domestic governance issues.

The second iteration Thai Mai Thon is led by activist Tae Achiwa, and has described itself as "Thailand first". The group has staged several anti-migrant protests, including in 2025 against a Thai cabinet resolution expediting citizenship and permanent residency applications for long-term migrants and ethnic minority children. In 2026, the group began a campaign to denounce the perceived misbehavior of Israelis in Thailand.

== History ==
=== First movement ===
In 2021, the group campaigned for the resignation of Thai Prime Minister Prayut Chan-o-cha, criticizing his response to the COVID-19 pandemic. Thai Mai Thon led demonstrations in front of Government House and led a march from Jetsadabodin Royal Pavilion on Ratchadamnoen Avenue to the City Pillar Shrine. Jatuporn subsequently faced charges related to the protest.

=== Second movement ===
In March 2026, Thai Mai Thon submitted a petition with over 86,000 signatures to the Ministry of Education advocating for suspending a 2025 regulation allowing the enrollment of undocumented students in Thailand.

In August 2026, Thai Mai Thon was among 9 civic groups that advocated for stricter criminal sentencing for serious murder and sexual-violence offenses, including the death penalty. Other groups included the Santi Prachatham Club, Pen Nueng Foundation, Saimai Survive, Do D Foundation, People for People Group, Ja King Saphan Mai Group, Muslim Volunteers for Social Development, and the Win Win Foundation.

On 24 August 2026, the group attempted to deliver a letter to the Ambassador of Israel to Thailand demanding Israeli tourists and residents in Thailand respect Thai laws. The embassy refused to accept the letter.

On 29 August 2026, Tae met with Thailand's Deputy Interior Minister Polpeera Suwannachawi to present a report on allegations of illegal foreign businesses in Koh Samui.

== Reception ==
The second iteration of Thai Mai Ton was described by Taiwanese leftist magazine New Bloom writer Micah Rieder as "Thailand’s own Proud Boy-esque nationalist goon squad", writing the group was known for assaulting pro-democracy activists.
