= Joseph Ivor Linton =

Israeli diplomat

Joseph Ivor Linton (also referred to as Ivor Joseph Linton) (July 2, 1900 – March 1, 1982) was an Israeli diplomat.

Born in Russia, he immigrated to England in 1919, where he engaged in Zionist activities on behalf of the Jewish Agency for Palestine. Following the establishment of the State of Israel, he served as Israeli Minister Plenipotentiary in Australia (December 6, 1950 – May 9, 1952) concurrently with New Zealand, Japan (December 26, 1952 – August 1, 1957), Thailand (non-resident, 1954-1958) and Switzerland (1958-1961). In 1961 served as head of the Israeli delegation to the United Nations Conference on Diplomatic Intercourse and Immunities, held in Vienna. He retired from diplomatic service in 1963.

Linton was a personal friend of Israel's first President, Chaim Weizmann, whom he had known in England. Linton disapproved of the Israeli reprisal policy against civilians in neighboring Arab countries.

Linton was a highly unusual diplomat. Not fluent in Hebrew, he wrote all his diplomatic reports in English. He was also very temperamental, which was the result of the mistrust shown towards him by his superiors in the Israeli Ministry of Foreign Affairs.

== See also ==
- Israel–Japan relations
