= Gilad Cohen =

Israeli diplomat

- גלעד כהן
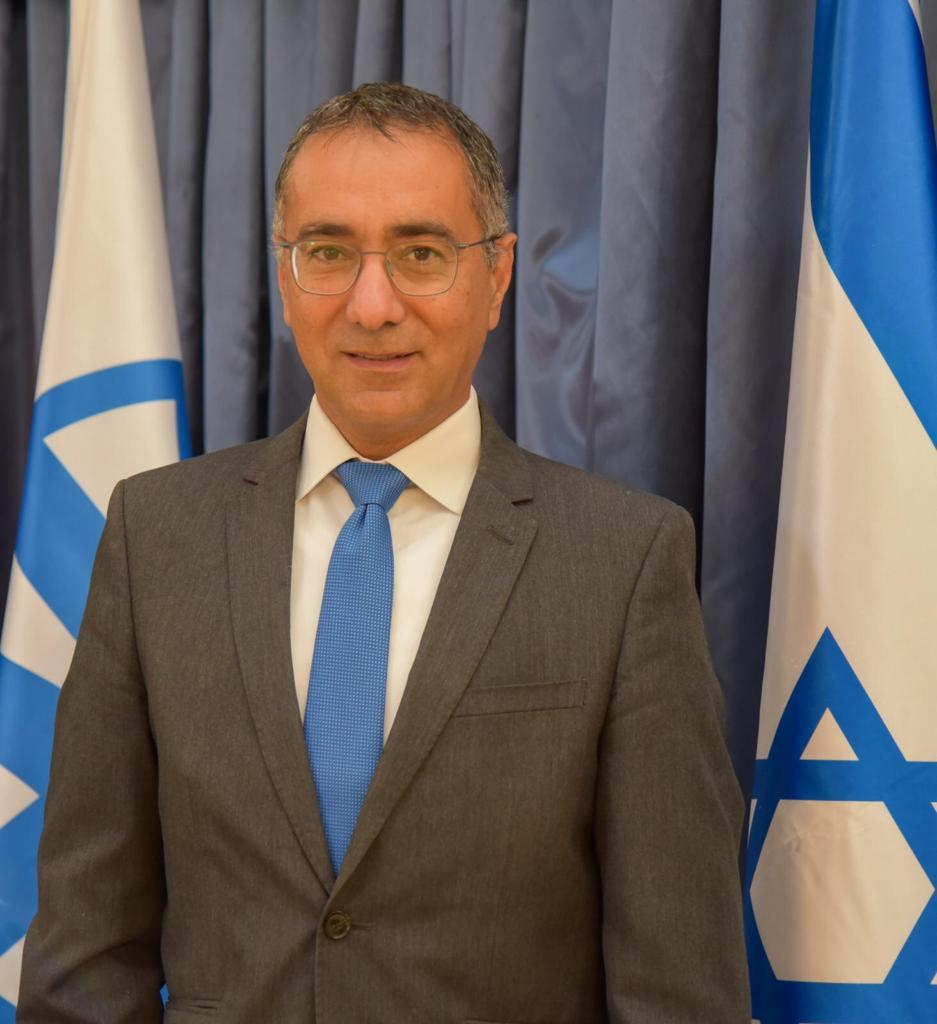

Ambassador of Israel to Japan
- Incumbent
- Assumed office October 2021

Deputy Director General for Asia and Pacific Division
- In office October 2017 – October 2021

Deputy Director General for Coordination and Policy Planning
- In office May 2014 – October 2017

Personal details
- Born: October 11, 1967 (age 58) Jaffa, Israel
- Education: Hebrew University of Jerusalem, Tel Aviv University
- Occupation: Diplomat

Gilad Cohen (Hebrew: גלעד כהן; born October 11, 1967) is an Israeli diplomat in the Israel Ministry of Foreign Affairs. Cohen serves as the Ambassador of Israel to Japan since October 2021. From 2017 to 2021, he served as the Deputy Director General for Asia and Pacific division at the Israel Ministry of Foreign Affairs. From 2014 to 2017, he served as the Deputy Director General for Coordination and Policy Planning, in the Israel Foreign Ministry.

== Personal background ==
Gilad Cohen was born in 1967 in Jaffa, Israel.

Cohen is fluent in Hebrew, English, and Portuguese. He is married, and has three children. Cohen graduated with a B.A. Degree in Political Science and International Relations from the Hebrew University of Jerusalem. He received his M.A. Executive studies in Security and Diplomacy from Tel Aviv University.

== Career ==
=== Early years ===
In 1994, Cohen was accepted to the Foreign Ministry (Diplomatic) cadet course. Upon completion, he joined the Foreign Service. From July 1996 to August 1999, he served as the Political Secretary and Spokesperson in the Embassy of Israel in Brasilia, Brazil.

=== Service in Turkey ===
From August 1999 to August 2001, he served as the Political Secretary and Spokesperson for the Embassy of Israel in Ankara, Turkey. During those years, Cohen engaged in intensive diplomatic efforts during a period considered to be the “golden age” of Israel-Turkey relations. These include Israel’s humanitarian support to Turkey after the 1999 Izmit earthquake and high level official visits by Prime Minister Ehud Barak and Prime Minister Ariel Sharon to Turkey.

=== Service in the Bureau of Coordination (first term) ===
From August 2001 to March 2004, he served as the Political Counselor for the Director General of Israel Foreign Ministry.

=== Service in Israel's Permanent Mission to the United Nations ===
From August 2004 to August 2008, Cohen was appointed as Political Counselor in Israel's Permanent Mission to the United Nations in New York. He served as one of the key diplomats who led the efforts which resulted in the conclusion of UN General Assembly resolution, which designated January 27 as the International Holocaust Remembrance Day Cohen was also involved in the acceptance of UN Security Council Resolution 1701, which brought an end to the 2006 Lebanon war. For his outstanding work at the UN, Cohen received the Civil Service award of Excellence.

=== Service in the Bureau of Coordination (second term) ===
From August 2008 to July 2011, Cohen returned to the Bureau for Coordination as Director, and from July 2011 to May 2014, he served as Head of the Bureau for Coordination. Cohen became Deputy Director General for the Coordination and Diplomacy Planning from May 2014 until October 2017. During his second tenure in the Bureau for Coordination, Cohen was responsible for the establishment of representative offices and discreet relations with the Gulf states which ultimately resulted in the normalization of relations in 2020 and the signing of the Abraham Accords.

=== Deputy Director General for Asia and Pacific Division ===
From October 2017 to 2021, Cohen served as the Head of Asia and Pacific Division. During this term Cohen was the highest ranking Israeli official to visit Bhutan and was responsible for the efforts towards establishing diplomatic relations between Israel and Bhutan in 2020. He also contributed in reaching to a Free Trade Agreement with South Korea in 2021. As DDG for Asia and the Pacific, Cohen designed and led the "Israel Looks East" policy which channels the Israeli foreign policy more towards Asia & the Pacific and resulted in numerous bilateral agreements i.e. the Free Trade Agreement signed with South Korea in 2021.

=== Ambassador to Japan ===
On June 20, 2021, the Israeli government approved Cohen’s appointment as the Ambassador of Israel to Japan. He took office in October of the same year. On November 5, he called on General Shunji Izutsu, Chief of Staff, Japan Air Self-Defense Force, and they formally shared the importance of strengthening bilateral defense cooperation and exchanges.

Cohen presented his letter of credence to Emperor Naruhito on November 25, 2021.

On 2 August 2024, the Nagasaki city government announced that Cohen would not be invited to the ceremony marking the 79th anniversary of the atomic bombing of Nagasaki due to concerns over potential protests related to the Gaza war. In response, the ambassadors of the United States and the United Kingdom chose not to attend the event on 9 August and sent lower-ranked diplomats instead. The ambassadors of Russia and Belarus were also not invited to the ceremony, while the Palestinian ambassador was invited.
