= List of ambassadors of Israel to Thailand =

== List of ambassadors ==
- Alona Fisher-Kamm 2025-Present
- Orna Sagiv 2021-2025
- Meir Shlomo 2017 - 2021
- Simon Roded 2012 - 2017
- Itzhak Shoham 2009 - 2012
- Yael Rubinstein 2005 - 2009
- Gershon Zohar 2002 - 2005
- David Matnai 1997 - 2002
- Mordechay Lewy 1994 - 1997
- Uzi Manor 1991 - 1994
- Benad Avital 1988 - 1991
- Itzhak Navon 1984 - 1988
- Avraham Cohen 1981 - 1984
- Mordehai Lador 1979 - 1981
- Reuben Dafni 1975 - 1979
- Rehavam Amir 1971 - 1975
- Daniel Levine (diplomat) 1969 - 1971
- Abraham Darom 1965 - 1968
- Yehiel Ilsar 1963 - 1965
- Ambassador Mordechai Kidron (some sources say Mordecai) 1958 - 1963
- Minister Joseph Ivor Linton (Non-Resident, Tokyo) 1954 - 1957
