= Israelis in Thailand =

Total population
- 31,892 Israeli nationals in Thailand (March 10, 2026 Immigration Technology Centre report)

Regions with significant populations
- Ko Pha-ngan, Phuket, Ko Samui

Languages
- Hebrew

Israelis in Thailand or Israeli Thais are citizens or residents of Thailand who were originally from Israel or are of Israeli descent.

== Demographics ==
Thailand is a popular tourist destination for Israeli nationals, with 508,181 Israelis reported visiting Thailand from January to May 2026.

In Islands such as Phuket, Ko Samui, and Ko Pha-ngan, there are numerous businesses operated by Israeli nationals.

== Contemporary issues ==
In February 2025, internet rumors circulated about over 30,000 Israelis living in Pai in Mae Hong Son province in Northern Thailand, leading to a police investigation into foreign nationals living in Pai for alleged illegal activities and public disturbances.

In March 2026, Thailand's immigration bureau denied reports that up to 425,000 foreign nationals, primarily Israelis, were living in Thailand. On March 10, 2026, the Immigration Technology Centre released a report showing approximately 31,892 Israeli nationals were in Thailand, including "both visa-exempt tourists and those holding visas for various reasons, such as business, study and accompanying family members."

On 2 June 2026, ten Israeli nationals were deported from Thailand after suspected of operating illegal businesses in Ko Pha-ngan. On 4 June, an Israeli businessman was detained by Thai authorities after allegedly operating an illegal studio business in the Pai district through nominee arrangements and provided false information in official registration documents. On 6 July, an Israeli was arrested for operating a childcare center without a work permit on Ko Pha-ngan. On 20 August, an Israeli man was fined 5,000 baht by the Ko Samui Provincial Court for making death threats to a Thai woman who was operating a zoo on the island.

== Protests against Israeli tourists ==
In 2026, Thai nationalist group Thai Mai Thon and others began a campaign to denounce the perceived misbehavior of Israelis in Thailand. In August 2026, 150 to 200 people in Patong, Phuket staged a "Save Phuket" protest against misbehaving tourists, including Israelis. The protesters' demands included limiting Israeli tourists to visa-free stays of up to 15 days in Thailand. On 10 September, hundreds of Thais gathered outside of the Israeli Embassy in Bangkok to protest against the behaviour of Israeli tourists, with demonstrators declaring that the country was "not for sale" and held signs saying, "Save Thailand" and "This is Not the Promised Land."

== See also ==
- History of the Jews in Thailand
- Israel–Thailand relations
