= List of ambassadors of Israel to Australia =

The Ambassador from Israel to Australia is Israel's foremost diplomatic representative in Australia.

== List of ambassadors ==
- Minister Joseph Ivor Linton 1950 – 1952
- Minister Mordekhai Nurock 1953 – 1958
- Moshe Yuval 1958 – 1963
- David Tesher 1956 – 1957
- Simcha Pratt 1967 – 1970
- Moshe Erell 1970 – 1974
- Michael Elizur 1974 – 1979
- Avraham Kidron 1979 – 1982
- Yissakhar Ben-Yaakov 1983 – 1987
- Tzvi Kedar 1987 - 1992
- Yehuda Avner 1992 – 1995
- Shmuel Moyal 1995 – 1999
- Gabby Levy 1999 – 2004
- Naftali Tamir 2005 – 2007
- Irit Lillian, acting Ambassador
- Yuval Rotem 2007 – 2013
- Shmuel Ben-Shmuel 2013 – 2017
- Mark Sofer 2017 – 2020
- Amir Maimon 2022 – 2026
- Hillel Newman 2026 – present

== Consulate (Sydney) ==
- Consul General Nahum Astar 1961 – 1964
- Consul General David Marmor 1969 – 1973
- Consul General Zvi Gabay 1986 – 1990
- Consul General Raphael Goren 1990 – 1994
- Consul General Mordechai Yedid 1994 – 1998
- Consul General Ephraim Ben-Matityahu 1999 – 2003
