= Hand in Hand – Bridge over the Wadi =

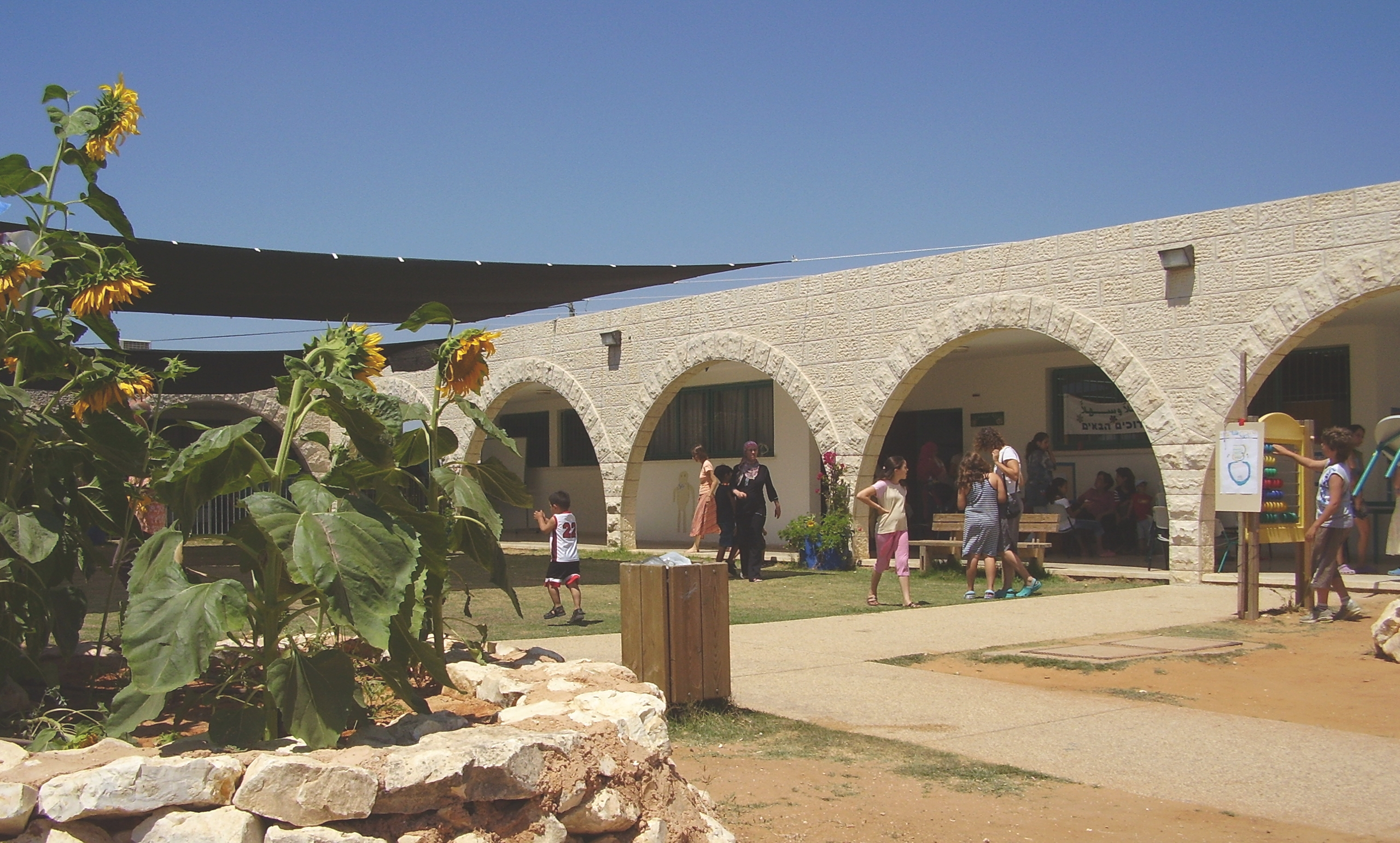
The schoolyard

Hand in Hand – Bridge over the Wadi (Arabic: يداً بيد – جسر عبر الوادي; Hebrew: יד ביד – גשר על הוואדי) is the third joint Arab-Jewish primary school in Israel, founded in 2004 by the Hand in Hand: Center for Jewish Arab Education in Israel, which also runs three other bilingual schools in Israel. It is located in Kafr Qara, an Arab village in the Wadi Ara area.

== History ==
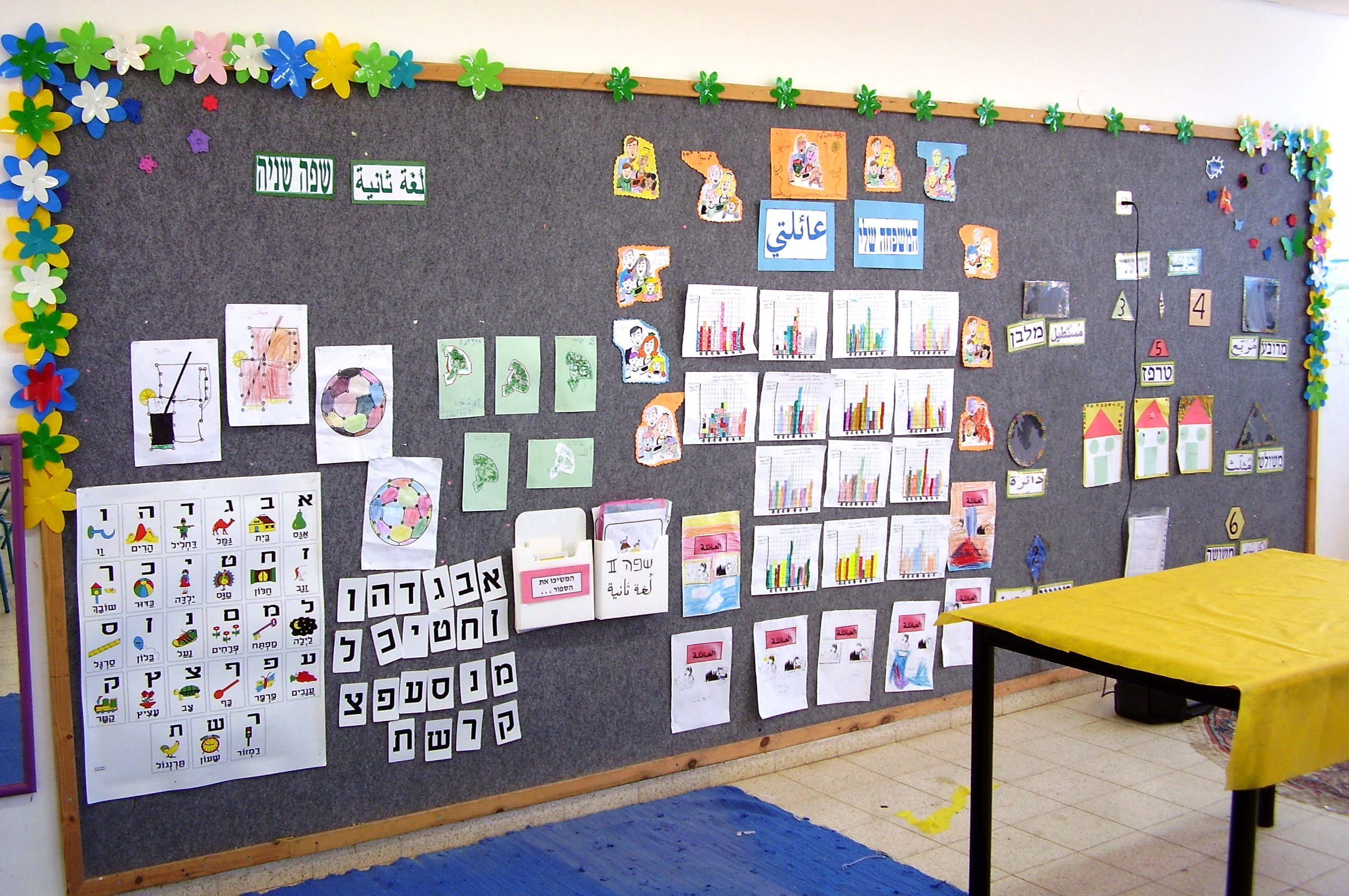
Inside the grade 1 classroom

The idea of the school started with a group of 10 Arabs and 10 Jews from the Wadi Ara area, as a reaction to the October 2000 riots. They assumed that joint education for their children would be an effective way to overcome violence and hatred.

The Head of the Local Council of Kafr Qara offered the group a building at the end of the village, originally built for the local high school. In 2004 the Israeli Ministry of Education approved the founding of the school at that location.

The school's students come from many settlements in the area, including Kafr Qara, 'Ara, Ar'ara, Baqa al-Gharbiyye, Katzir-Harish, Pardes Hanna-Karkur, Ein Iron, Givat Ada, and others. The school is the subject of a 2008 documentary, "Bridge Over the Wadi."

In its first year, 2004–2005, the school had 105 students, from kindergarten to grade 3; in the 2005–2006 year, there were 180 students, from kindergarten to grade 4. 50% of the students were Arabs, and 50% Jewish.

The number of Jewish students has declined since 2011, allegedly due to the political situation and high crime in the Arab sector.

== Educational model ==
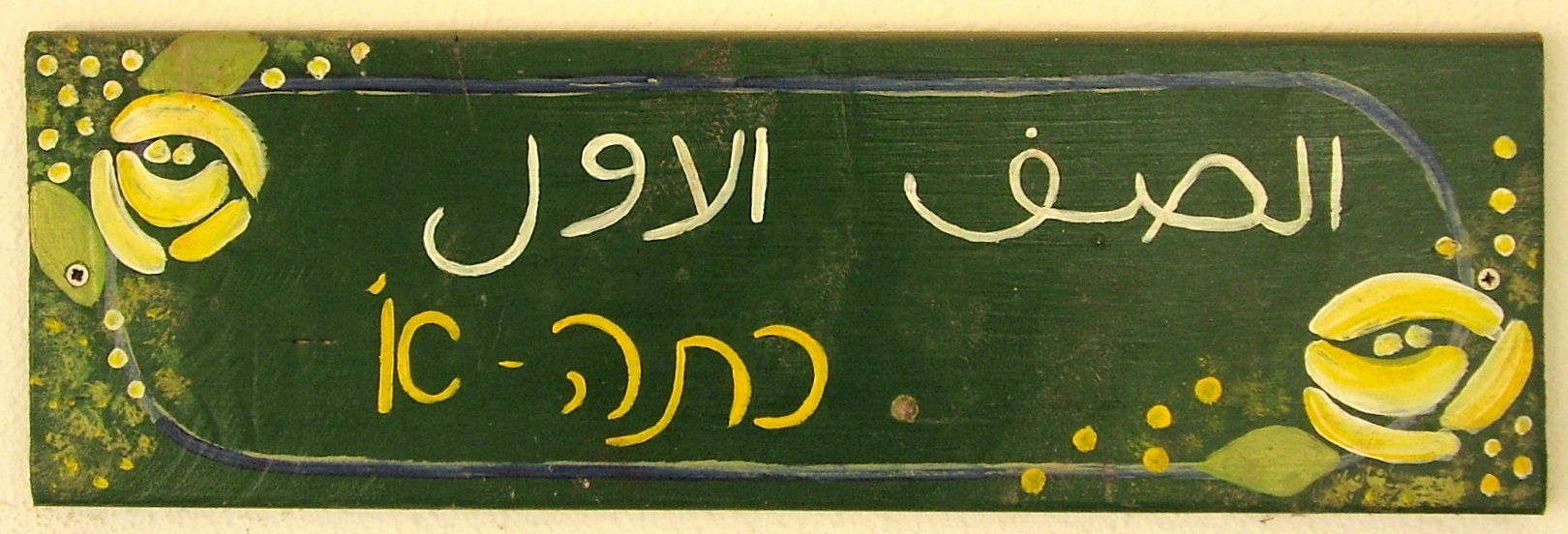
The sign at the entrance to the grade 1 classroom

As in all Hand in Hand schools, Bridge over the Wadi has an equal number of Arab and Jewish students; each class has two teachers, one Arab and one Jewish, the school has two co-principals, Arab and Jewish (currently Nuha Khatieb and Yohanan Eshchar).

The school teaches bi-lingually, in Arabic and Hebrew; the students' achievements in both languages are comparable to the achievements of students in single-language schools in Israel.

The school exposes the students to the three cultures: Jewish, Islamic and Christian, and demonstrates in a straightforward and practical way the principles of democracy and social equality.
