= Eitan Na'eh =

Israeli diplomat (1963–2026)

- איתן נאה
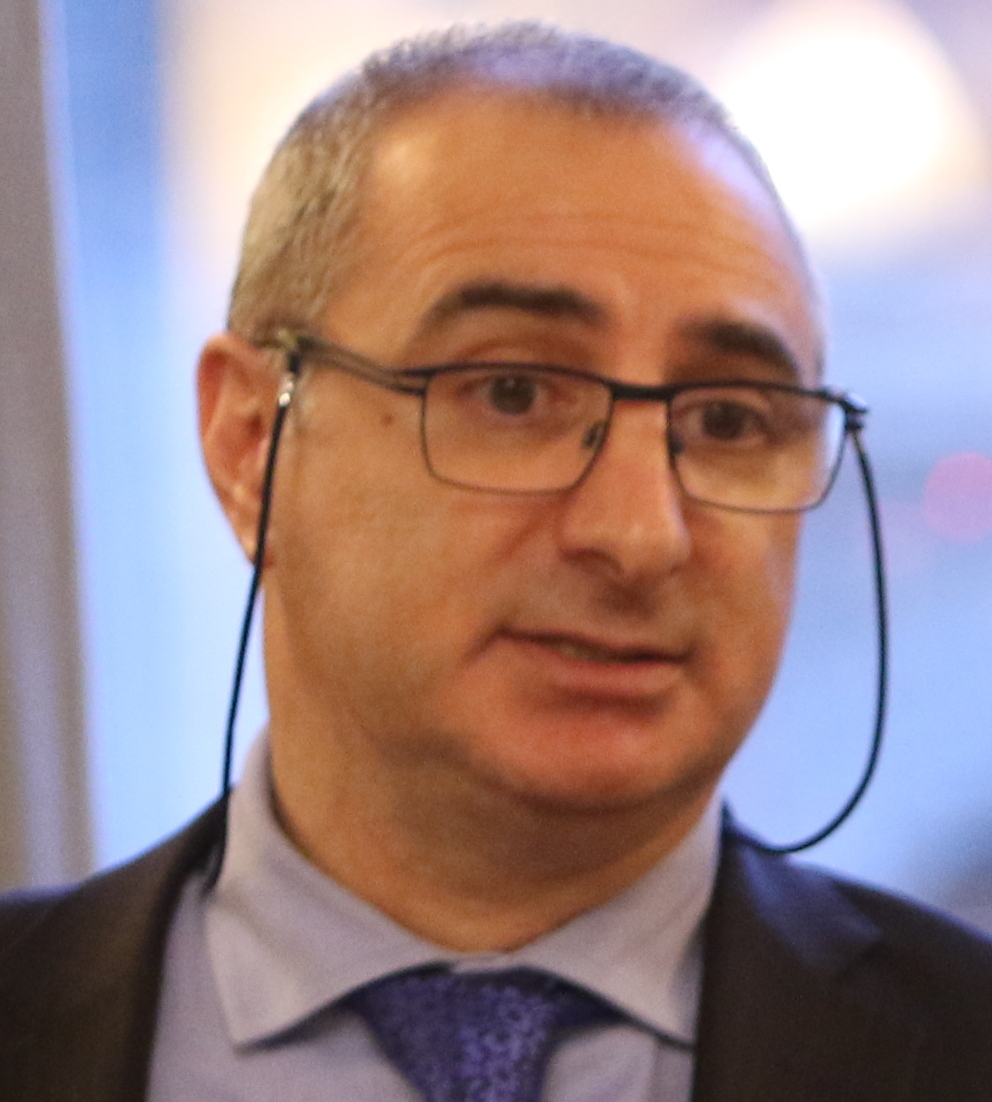
- Na'eh in 2016

Ambassador of Israel in Bahrain
- In office 28 December 2021 – 2 November 2023
- Preceded by: Office created

Head of Mission of the Embassy of Israel in the United Arab Emirates
- In office 24 January 2021 – 11 October 2021
- Preceded by: Office created
- Succeeded by: Amir Hayek (as ambassador)

Ambassador of Israel in Turkey
- In office 5 December 2016 – 15 May 2018
- Preceded by: Amira Oron
- Succeeded by: Irit Lillian

Personal details
- Born: 17 September 1963
- Died: 19 January 2026 (aged 62)
- Citizenship: Israel
- Education: Tel Aviv University

Eitan Na'eh (Hebrew: איתן נאה; 17 September 1963 – 19 January 2026) was an Israeli diplomat who served as ambassador to Turkey, the United Arab Emirates, and Bahrain. He was the first Israeli ambassador to the UAE and Bahrain after the signing of the Abraham Accords.

== Diplomatic career ==
=== Turkey ===
Na'eh was appointed Israel's ambassador to Turkey on 15 November 2016. He presented his credentials to President Recep Tayyip Erdoğan on 5 December 2016, at the Presidential Complex in Ankara.

In May 2018, the Turkish Ministry of Foreign Affairs expelled Na'eh in response to the killing of 60 Palestinians by Israeli forces. The Turkish government invited journalists to film a security check conducted on Na'eh as he left the country. The Israeli Ministry of Foreign Affairs protested the check.

=== UAE ===
Relations between the United Arab Emirates (UAE) and Israel were normalized by the Abraham Accords. In January 2021, Israel opened an embassy in Abu Dhabi in the UAE, with Na'eh serving as head of the mission until 11 October 2021.

=== Bahrain ===
Relations between Bahrain and Israel were normalized by the Abraham Accords. On 2 September 2021, it was reported that Na'eh was appointed Israel's ambassador to Bahrain, subject to government approval. On 28 December 2021, he submitted his letter of accreditation to King Hamad, officially starting his tenure as the first ambassador of Israel to Bahrain. On 2 November 2023, Bahrain announced his departure and recalled its ambassador to Israel.

== Personal life and death ==
Na'eh's wife is from Manchester, England. Na'eh died on 19 January 2026.
