= Israel–New Zealand relations =

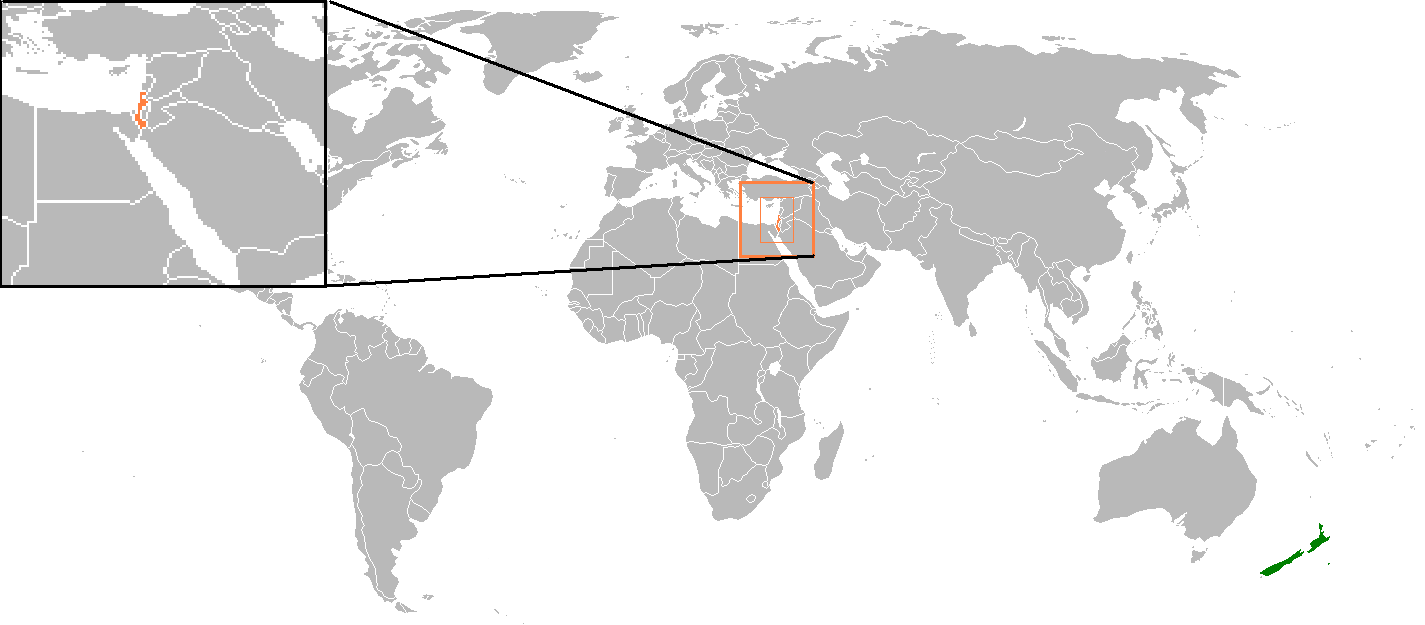

- New Zealand: Israel

Israel–New Zealand relations are the foreign relations between the State of Israel and New Zealand. While Israel has an embassy in Wellington, New Zealand's embassy in Ankara, Turkey is accredited to Israel. Diplomatic relations between the two countries date back to January 1949. New Zealand has exported a mixture of agricultural and manufactured goods to Israel. In return, Israel has exported a range of manufactured goods to New Zealand. Bilateral relations between the two countries have been complicated by issues such as the 2004 Israel–New Zealand passport scandal, United Nations Security Council Resolution 2334, and the Israel-Palestine conflict.

== Diplomatic representation ==
Israel has an embassy in Wellington with an honorary consulate in Auckland.

New Zealand's embassy to Turkey in Ankara is accredited to Israel. In addition, New Zealand has an honorary consulate in Tel Aviv.

== History of bilateral relations ==
=== 20th century ===
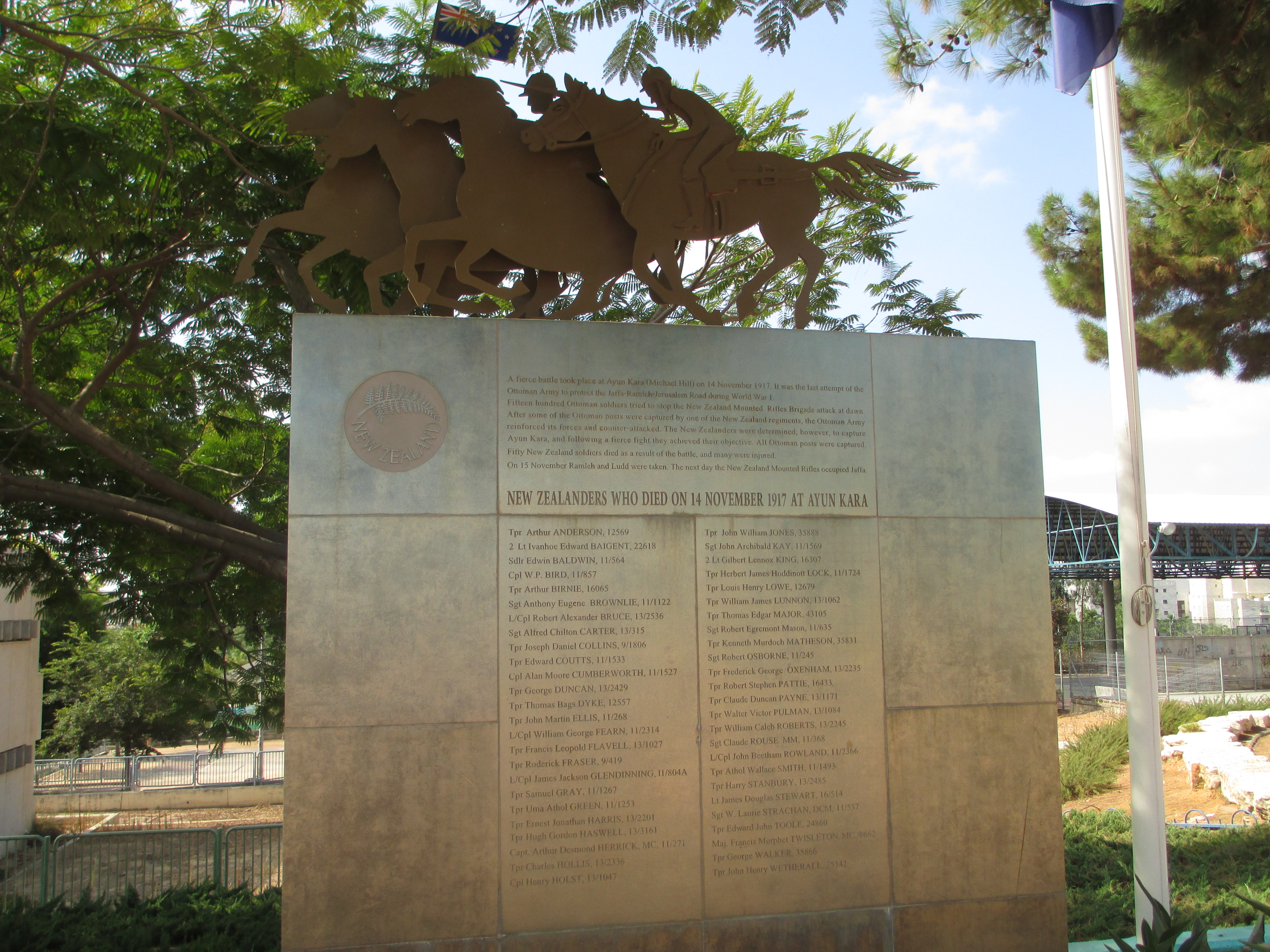
Memorial to New Zealand soldiers who died at the battle of Ayun Kara, Palestine, on 14 November 1917

New Zealand forces serving with the Australian and New Zealand Army Corps (ANZACs) participated in the Allied Sinai and Palestine campaign of the First World War. In November 1917, these New Zealand soldiers came into contact with Jewish settlers in Rehovot and Rishon. While New Zealand forces maintained cordial relations with the Jewish community, they had tense relations with local Palestinian Arabs, which culminated in the Surafend affair which saw ANZAC forces kill the male inhabitants of Sarafand al-Amar in retaliation for the killing of a New Zealand soldier. These contacts plus the New Zealand Jewish community's interest in Zionism influenced the New Zealand Government's support for the Balfour Declaration's promise of creating a Jewish homeland in Palestine.

New Zealand voted in favour of the 1947 United Nations partition resolution, which led to the creation of the State of Israel, despite heavy pressure from the United Kingdom on all Commonwealth nations to abstain on the resolution. New Zealand gave de facto recognition to the State of Israel at the same time as the United Kingdom on 29 January 1949, and de jure recognition on 28 July 1950. The incumbent Prime Minister Peter Fraser, who also served as Minister of External Affairs, had extensive contacts with the New Zealand Jewish community and local Zionists including the Zionist Federation of New Zealand. He also expressed sympathy for the Jewish people following the Holocaust, supported a Jewish homeland in Palestine, and called for peace between Jews and Arabs.

In January 1973, Prime Minister Norman Kirk approved the establishment of an Israeli Embassy in Wellington following overtures by the Israeli government. Following Kirk's death in August 1974, his successor Bill Rowling facilitated the opening of the Israeli Embassy in July 1975. To demonstrate New Zealand's policy of "even-handedness" towards Israel and Arab states, Rowling accepted credentials from both the Israeli and Egyptian Embassies on the same day. In addition, New Zealand voted to designate permanent observer status to the Palestinian Liberation Organisation in the United Nations. When the Israeli Charge d'Affairs Yosef Hassin protested, Rowling responded that New Zealand had voted to extend a voice to Israel in 1974 and was now extending the same right to the Palestinians.

=== 21st century ===
New Zealand and Israel maintained an active diplomatic relationship over the start of the 2000s, which was complicated by later disputes. New Zealand's Minister for Research, Science and Technology, Pete Hodgson, visited in November–December 2000. A Knesset delegation visited New Zealand in August 2001. New Zealand Foreign Minister Phil Goff visited Israel in May 2003. A delegation of four senior Israeli Foreign Ministry officials traveled to New Zealand for the inaugural New Zealand-Israel Foreign Ministry Consultations in September 2003.

The Israeli embassy in Wellington closed in October 2002 due to financial reasons, but reopened in 2010 with Shemi Tzur appointed as the Ambassador to New Zealand. In June 2013 he was replaced by Ambassador Yosef Livne.

==== 2004 passport scandal ====
On 15 July 2004, New Zealand imposed diplomatic sanctions against Israel, and in July 2005 suspended high-level contacts between the two countries, after two Israeli citizens, Uriel Kelman and Eli Cara, were accused of passport fraud in Auckland. They denied belonging to the Mossad, but received a six-month sentence for trying to enter the country illegally and working with organised criminal gangs. Prime Minister Helen Clark cancelled a planned visit to New Zealand by Israeli President Moshe Katzav, delayed approval for a new Israeli ambassador to New Zealand, and called the case "far more than simple criminal behaviour by two individuals" which "seriously strained our relationship."

Jewish graves in Wellington were vandalised with Swastikas and Nazi slogans carved into and around 16 Jewish graves. David Zwartz, a leader in the Jewish community in New Zealand who was appointed as the Honorary Consul from Israel to New Zealand in 2003, said:"...there is a direct connection between the very strong expressions against Israel and people here feeling they can take it out on Jews. It seems to me Israel-bashing one day, Jew-bashing the next day."

The Israeli Deputy Chief of Staff, Gabi Ashkenazi, was denied permission to visit New Zealand to speak at a private fund-raising event in March 2005 because of the freeze on visits from Israeli officials.

On June 26, 2005 Foreign Minister Shalom sent a letter of apology to the New Zealand government, and said that Israel would take steps to prevent a recurrence of similar incidents.

Diplomatic relations were reinstated on August 30, 2005. Naftali Tamir presented his credentials to Governor-General Dame Silvia Cartwright before a guard of honour. Amos Nadav, the Israeli Foreign Minister's deputy director for Asia and the Pacific said "We are happy the crisis is behind us and look ahead to the future."

==== 2015 diplomatic accreditation dispute ====
In 2015 Israel and New Zealand settled a diplomatic dispute that had arisen when New Zealand assigned an ambassador to Israel who was also slated to be the ambassador to the Palestinians. In September 2014 Israel would not allow Ambassador Jonathan Curr to present his credentials, saying that would violate Israel's "well-known policy" of not receiving diplomats who are also received by the Palestinian Authority. New Zealand ended the conflict by appointing separate diplomats to Israel and the Palestinian authority, a move viewed as motivated by its recent election as a non-permanent member of the United Nations Security Council and increasing impatience within the council over failure to agree on a UN stance in the Israeli-Palestinian peace process.

==== UNSC Resolution 2334 ====
On 23 December 2016, New Zealand was a co-sponsor on Resolution 2334, which condemned the ongoing building of Israeli settlements in occupied Palestinian territories. New Zealand's Foreign Minister Murray McCully defended his Government's actions as being in line with New Zealand's "established policy on the Palestinian question" and emphasised New Zealand's willingness to "engage constructively with all parties on this issue".

In December 2016 Israeli Prime Minister Benjamin Netanyahu instructed Israel's ambassador in New Zealand to return to Israel for consultations, in response to NZ's support for United Nations Security Council Resolution 2334. Immediately after the vote, Netanyahu ordered a series of diplomatic steps against countries that co-sponsored the resolution and with whom Israel has diplomatic relations. Israel–New Zealand relations had not been this fraught since 2004, when New Zealand imprisoned 'Mossad spies' for attempting to fraudulently obtain a New Zealand passport. In February 2017, Israel decided not to return its ambassador to New Zealand and downgraded its diplomatic relations with New Zealand to the level of chargés d'affaires, which is the lowest level of diplomatic relations. In addition, the New Zealand Ambassador (who is based in Ankara, Turkey) was barred from entering Israel.

On June 14, 2017, the NZ Foreign Minister Gerry Brownlee confirmed that full bilateral relations had been restored following discreet high-level contacts between the Israeli and New Zealand governments. These contacts involved a telephone conversation between Prime Minister Netanyahu and his New Zealand counterpart Prime Minister Bill English. English also penned a letter expressing regret at the fallout from UN Resolution 2334. Following the letter and phone conversation, the Israeli Foreign Ministry's director-general Yuval Rotem announced that the Israeli Ambassador Itzhak Gerbeg would be returning to Wellington to assume his duties. The New Zealand Labour Party leader Andrew Little and the Green Party's foreign affairs spokesperson Kennedy Graham criticised the government for backtracking on its previous support for the resolution and sending mixed messages.

==== 2025 foreign ministers' conversation ====
On 13 February 2025, New Zealand Foreign Minister Winston Peters spoke with Israeli Foreign Minister Gideon Sa'ar via phone about the January 2025 Gaza war ceasefire including the release of all hostages and the resumption of humanitarian aid to the Palestinians. Sa'ar also thanks Peters for New Zealand designating Hamas and the Houthis as terrorist organisations, and extended an invitation for Peters to visit Israel.

== Economic relations ==
In 1994 Israel opened a trade office in Auckland and the New Zealand and Israel Trade Association, known as NZITA, was established. Since 2001, Fonterra, New Zealand's largest dairy company, has been involved in a joint venture with the Israeli cooperative Tnuva. As of 2007, New Zealand agricultural exports to Israel had been hampered by a tariff on foreign agricultural exports imposed by Israel.

By 2008, New Zealand had exported NZ$52 million worth of exports to Israel. New Zealand exports to Israel have included machines, equipment, software, cut diamonds, agricultural products, chemicals, textiles and apparel, military equipment, and food. Imports into New Zealand from Israel were worth NZ$120 million and have included turbo equipment (10%), machine parts (9%); auxiliary plant equipment (8%), electrical products including insulated wire (8%), and diamonds (3%).

== Tourism ==
New Zealand and Israel also have a visitor visa waiver programme. By late 2008, 10,000 Israelis had visited New Zealand.

In April 2011, Israel and New Zealand signed a reciprocal deal that allows tourists to work for three months without an additional visa. The deal was signed by the Speaker of the Knesset, Reuven Rivlin and his New Zealand counterpart Lockwood Smith, when Rivlin was visiting New Zealand.

== Issues and controversies ==
=== 2011 Christchurch earthquake ===
A combination of unusual events immediately following the death of Israeli backpacker Ofer Mizrahi in the 2011 Christchurch earthquake caused the New Zealand government to investigate whether he and his companions had links to Israeli intelligence. The story gained media attention in July 2011 due to Mizrahi having five foreign passports on his person when being examined at the morgue, and his companions all leaving New Zealand within 12 hours of the earthquake and their companion's death. Israeli Prime Minister Netanyahu called Prime Minister John Key four times following the earthquake, and dispatched the Israeli ambassador to the South Pacific and Israel's civil defense chief to Christchurch. A search and rescue team funded by the families of 2 other Israelis missing in the quake was turned away by recovery officials due to the lack of UN accreditation. The search and rescue team was later found in the cordoned off "red zone", and removed by armed police officers.

New Zealand security officials suspected Mizrahi and his companions were Mossad agents attempting to infiltrate the state's computer databases to gain sensitive information. An investigation that involved the New Zealand Security Intelligence Service concluded that there was no evidence of such an operation, or their involvement with Israeli intelligence.

=== Israel–Palestine conflict ===
Like most Western countries New Zealand has not officially recognised Palestine as a sovereign state. New Zealand has condemned the Israeli occupation of the West Bank and has rigorously promoted a United Nations-backed two-state solution. While it regularly votes for pro-Palestinian measures at the UN, New Zealand is yet to formally challenge only Israel when tensions erupt into significant violence, as with the May 2021 hostilities.

Although the New Zealand Government under Jacinda Ardern has advocated a placative diplomatic policy towards both Israel that defends its right to exist, a poll from 2022 show that 21% of New Zealanders believe Israel to be an apartheid state, even though there is no racial segregation in Israel since Arabs that are Israeli have full right in Israel as Jewish and citizens, while Israeli Jews are not allowed to enter the Palestinian territories.

==== 2021 Israel–Palestine crisis ====
In response to the 2021 Israel–Palestine crisis that broke out in May 2021, Foreign Minister Nanaia Mahuta called on Israel to "cease demolitions and evictions" and for "both sides to halt steps which undermine prospects for a two state solution". Mahuta's statements were echoed by Prime Minister Jacinda Ardern, who condemned "indiscriminate rocket fire" from Hamas and "what looks to be a response that has gone well beyond self-defence on both sides." She also stated that Israel had the "right to exist" but Palestinians also had a "right to a peaceful home, a secure home." In mid-May, Prime Minister Ardern also sought an assurance from the Ministry of Foreign Affairs and Trade that a shipment of firearms suppressors being sent to an Israeli firm for evaluation purposes was not being used in the current conflict between Israel and Hamas.

On 19 May, the Green Party MP Golriz Ghahraman sponsored a motion calling for Members of Parliament to recognise the right of Palestinians to self-determination and statehood. This motion failed to pass due to opposition from the centre-right National and ACT parties. The governing Labour Party also declined to support the motion while the Māori Party was the only other parliamentary party to support the Greens' motion. In response to criticism by ACT Party deputy leader Brooke Van Velden, Ghahraman also defended fellow Green MP Ricardo Menéndez March's tweet that said "From the river to the sea, Palestine will be free!." Ghahraman claimed that March was defending the rights of both Arabs and Jews to having equal rights in their homeland.

==== Gaza war ====
On 8 October, Foreign Minister Nanaia Mahuta expressed deep concern in response to the Hamas attack on the Israeli communities on the 7 of October 2023. She called for an immediate halt to violence, the protection of all civilians, and the upholding of international humanitarian law. Mahuta was criticized for not condemning the Hamas attacks. Prime Minister Chris Hipkins confirmed that New Zealand unequivocally condemned Hamas' terror attacks, stating that the target of civilians and hostage taking violated fundamental international humanitarian principles. Hipkins also stated Israel had the right to defend itself.

On 17 October, the Government contributed NZ$5 million to the International Committee of the Red Cross's (ICRC) and the United Nations' World Food Programme's humanitarian relief efforts. On 25 October Carolyn Schwalger, New Zealand's Permanent Representative to the United Nations, delivered a statement from Hipkins to the United Nations Security Council calling for a "humanitarian pause" to allow Gazan civilians to receive aid and for the creation of safe zones for civilians during the 2023 Israel-Hamas war. Hipkins authored the statement in consultation with incoming Prime Minister Christopher Luxon. On 28 October, New Zealand voted in favour of United Nations General Assembly Resolution ES-10/21.

On 7 December 2023, Foreign Minister Winston Peters successfully moved a motion calling for a ceasefire in the Israel-Hamas conflict. The motion also condemned Hamas' terror attack on 7 October, called for the release of all hostages, recognised Israel's right to defend itself in accordance with international law, and called for civilians to be protected from armed conflict. The government's motion also incorporated an amendment by Labour MP Phil Twyford calling for the establishment of a State of Palestine in accordance with a two-state solution. Peter's motion was criticised as being insufficient by Labour MP Damien O'Connor and Green MP Ghahraman.

In late February 2024, the New Zealand Government designated the political wing of Hamas as a terrorist entity. Previous governments had only designated the military wing of Hamas as a terrorist organisation. In addition, New Zealand issued travel bans targeting several extremist Israeli settlers who had committed violent acts against Palestinians in the West Bank.

In early December 2024, Prime Minister Christopher Luxon confirmed that New Zealand would comply with an International Criminal Court (ICC) arrest warrant in the event that Israeli Prime Minister Benjamin Netanyahu visited the country. During a press conference, he stated, "We believe in the international rules-based system, we support the ICC, and we would be obligated to do so."

In late January 2025, The Times of Israel reported that Immigration New Zealand was requiring Israelis applying for visitor visa to complete detailed questionnaires about their military service, association with intelligence services or law enforcement organisations, and involvement in war crimes, crimes against humanity and human rights abuses. The newspaper reported that at least one Israeli had been denied entry since he had served in Gaza during the Israel-Hamas war. According to Immigration NZ, the government department had received 944 visitor and residency applications from Israeli nationals between 7 October 2023 and 14 January 2025; approving 809 applications and declining 37. During the same period, Immigration NZ received 259 applications from Palestinians; approving 177 applications and declining 53.

In response to media coverage, Immigration NZ denied that it had declined a visitor visa to an Israeli national on the basis of their Israeli military service. They also said that visas had been denied on other grounds such as providing proof of their ties to their home countries, reasons for their stay or evidence of travel plans. Immigration NZ also affirmed that New Zealand's visa-free agreement with Israel remained intact. Immigration NZ also refused to confirm whether Israelis were being asked to disclose details of their military service. In response to a Haaretz report, United States Senator Ted Cruz accused New Zealand of discriminating against Israeli citizens in an X (formerly Twitter) post. This prompted Foreign Minister Winston Peters, the New Zealand Embassy in the United States and cabinet minister David Seymour to issue statements clarifying that Israelis entering New Zealand did not have to apply for visitor visas or declare their military service.

On 20 May 2025, Peters joined 22 European, Australian, Canadian and Japanese foreign ministers and the European Union in issuing a joint statement calling on Israel to allow a full resumption of aid to Gaza. Israel has imposed a full-scale blockade on humanitarian aid in March 2025. Peters said: "We believe the excuse Israel's got has long since evaporated away, given the suffering that's going on. Many countries share our view - that's why overnight we put out the statement.

On 11 June 2025, New Zealand joined the United Kingdom, Australia, Canada and Norway in imposing travel bans on Israeli National Security Minister Itamar Ben-Gvir and Finance Minister Bezalel Smotrich for allegedly inciting "extremist violence" against Palestinians in the West Bank. Peters released a statement stating:

Our action today is not against the Israeli people, who suffered immeasurably on October 7 and who have continued to suffer through Hamas' ongoing refusal to release all hostages. Nor is it designed to sanction the wider Israeli government. Rather, the travel bans are targeted at two individuals who are using their leadership positions to actively undermine peace and security and remove prospects for a two-state solution."

On 30 July 2025, New Zealand joined 15 other countries including France, Canada and Australia in signing the "New York Call" which proposed recognising Palestinian statehood at the United Nations General Assembly in September 2025. This announcement was criticised by both the US and Israeli governments for "rewarding" Hamas' terrorism. On 9 August 2025, the NZ, Australian, German, Italian and British Foreign Ministers issued a joint statement condemning Netanyahu's plan to militarily occupy Gaza City. That same day, Luxon and Australian Prime Minister Anthony Albanese reiterated calls for a ceasefire in Gaza and opposed Israeli plans to occupy Gaza City.

On 17 September 2025, Peters said that the New Zealand would not support the UN report that described the situation in the Gaza Strip as genocide but would instead wait for the ICJ's decision. On 26 September, Peters clarified New Zealand's decision not to recognise Palestinian statehood during the 80th session of the United Nations General Assembly, stating "that it would encourage Hamas to resist negotiation in the belief it was winning the propaganda war." On 29 October, the New Zealand Defence Force sent a liaison officer to inform the New Zealand government about the Israel-Hamas peace process. The officer would be based at the United States-led "Civil Military Coordination Centre."

On 2 June 2026, Foreign Minister Winston Peters announced a travel ban against three extremist Israeli settlers, Itamar Yehuda Levi, Harel David Libi, and Eliav Libi, who have "actively worked to expand illegal settlements in the West Bank, including through violence." Peters also stated that the ban does not target the Israeli people or government and continue to call for a two-state solution that "will secure peace, safety, and prosperity for Israelis and Palestinians alike."

== See also ==
- History of the Jews in New Zealand
- International recognition of Israel
