= List of ambassadors of Israel to New Zealand =

== List of ambassadors ==
- Ran Yaakoby 2020 - present
- Itzhak Gerberg 2016 - 2020
- Yosef Livne 2013 - 2016
- Shemi Tzur 2010 - 2013
- Yuval Rotem 2007-2013
- Naftali Tamir 2005-2007
- Ruth Kahanoff 2001 - 2002
- Lydia Chokron 1998 - 2001
- Nissan Krupsky 1993 - 1998
- Shmuel Ovnat 1989 - 1993
- Efraim Eldar 1986 - 1989
- Zvi Zimmerman 1983-1986
- Yaakov Moris 1977 - 1982
- Haim Raphael 1974 - 1977
- Moshe Erell (Non-Resident, Canberra) 1970 - 1974
- Simcha Pratt (Non-Resident, Canberra) 1967 - 1970
- Moshe Yuval (Non-Resident, Canberra) 1958 - 1963
- Mordekhai Nurock (Non-Resident, Canberra) 1953 - 1958
- Minister Joseph Ivor Linton 1950 - 1952
