= Miryam Shomrat =

Israeli diplomat

- מרים שמרת

Israel Ambassador to Finland
- In office 2015–2019
- Preceded by: Naftali Tamir
- Succeeded by: Shemi Tzur

Israel Ambassador to Norway
- In office 2005–2008
- Preceded by: Liora Herzl
- Succeeded by: Michael Eligal

Personal details
- Occupation: Diplomat

Miryam Shomrat (Hebrew: מרים שמרת) was the Israeli ambassador to Norway from 2005 until 2008 and ambassador to Finland from 2000 until 2003.

== Diplomatic career ==
While ambassador to Norway, Shomrat publicly criticized King Harald, Queen Sonja and Prime Minister Jens Stoltenberg for not supporting the cause of the Jews. In a televised interview she said: "I think a gesture from the royal household to the Jewish community on the eve of the (Jewish) New Year would have been in place anyway, certainly a show of solidarity after the shooting incident would have been in place. Forgive me for saying it so openly, but I do think it is a very important gesture which should be taken." Shomrat was reacting to a shooting in September 2006 at a synagogue in Oslo and her response was seen as inappropriate, including from the local Norwegian Jewish community.
