= Dan Ashbel =

Israeli ambassador

Dan Ashbel (Hebrew: דן אשבל; born 1949 in Tel Aviv, Israel) is a retired Israeli ambassador.

== Biography ==
Dan Ashbel was born in Tel Aviv in 1949. He studied Geography and English Literature at the University of Haifa. At a later stage he completed his Master in Political Science with a focus on the Middle East.

Dan Ashbel is married to Zehava and they have three sons.

== Professional career ==
From 1973 to 1975 Ashbel worked as a teacher at the Kfar HaNoar HaDati High School in Kfar Hasidim near Haifa. In 1975 he joined Israel's diplomatic service, and in 1978 became First Secretary for press and cultural affairs at the embassy of Israel in Bonn, Germany. This post ended in 1983. From 1983 to 1986, he held the posts of head of the director's office for the Center for Political Research and deputy press spokesman of the Ministry of Foreign Affairs in Jerusalem. Between 1986 and 1989 he was counselor and DCM at the Israeli embassy in Austria. In 1989, he took up a three-year post as press counselor at the Israeli embassy to the United Kingdom in London. During that period he participated in the Madrid Peace Conference of 1991.

Upon his return from London in 1992, Ashbel took over the responsibility for the Israeli cooperation program for Central Asian countries. Later, he became the director of the Training Division and Europe II Division in the Ministry of Foreign Affairs, Jerusalem. From 1994 to 1996 he was an instructor at Israel's National Defense College. This was followed by the post of Israel's Consul General for the Mid-Atlantic region in the USA, based in Philadelphia between 1997 and 2000. Ashbel then became director of the division of European Multilateral Institutions and coordinator for the Euro-Mediterranean Partnership (Euromed) in the Israeli Foreign Ministry. From March 2005 to October 2009, he was Israel's ambassador to Austria. This post included also the representation of Israel in the Organization for Security and Cooperation in Europe and the United Nations International Organizations in Vienna. From 2006 to 2009, he was also the non-resident ambassador of Israel to Slovenia. Since November 2009, Ashbel has been the Political Advisor to the Knesset (Israel's Parliament). From September 2011 to April 2016 Dan Ashbel served as Israel's Ambassador to Finland and Estonia.
