= List of ambassadors of Israel to Cyprus =

== List of ambassadors ==
- Oren Anolik 2021-
- Shmuel (Sammy) Revel (2017-2021)
- Yael Ravia-Zadok 2015 - 2017
- Michael Harari (diplomat) 2010 - 2015
- Avraham Haddad 2006 - 2010
- Zvi Cohen-Litant 2004 - 2006
- Michael Eligal 2000 - 2004
- Shemi Tzur 1993 - 2000
- David Granit 1992 - 1993
- Aharon Lopez 1987 - 1992
- Amos Shtibel 1986 - 1987
- Meir Gavish 1984 - 1986
- Zeev Dover 1981 - 1983
- Avraham Giladi 1979 - 1981
- Nahum Eshkol 1977 - 1979
- Nissim Yosha 1974 - 1977
- Charge d'Affaires a.i. Mordechai David Palzur
