= Yael Ravia-Zadok =

Israeli diplomat

- יעל רביה-צדוק

Ambassador to Cyprus
- In office 2015–2017

Yael Ravia-Zadok (Hebrew: יעל רביה-צדוק) is the deputy director-general and head of the Economic Diplomacy Division at the Israel Ministry of Foreign Affairs, who served as the Ambassador to Cyprus from 2015 until 2017.
