= List of ambassadors of Israel to Turkmenistan =

== List of ambassadors ==
- Ismail Khaldi, 03/2023–to present
- Beth-Eden Kite, 06/2020–02/2023
- Moshe Kimhi, 2017–09/01/2020
- Itzhak Carmel-Kagan, 2015–2017
- Shemi Tzur, 2013–2015
- Ehud Gol (Non-Resident, Jerusalem), 2007–2008
- David Granit (Non-Resident, Ankara), 1995
