= Dov Segev-Steinberg =

Israeli diplomat

- דב שגב-שטיינברג
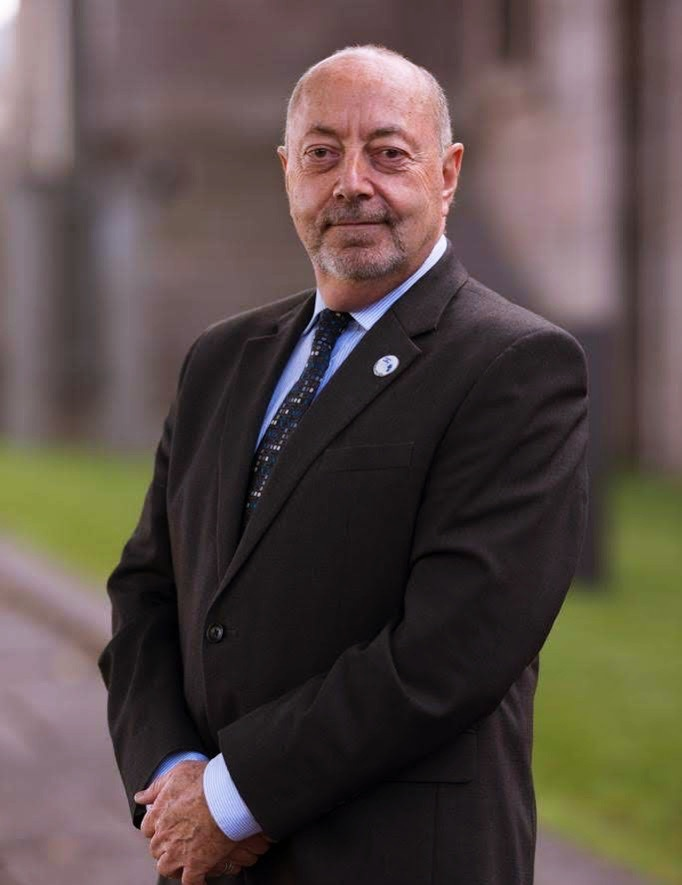
- Born: 1956 (age 69–70); Tel Aviv, Israel
- Education: Tel Aviv University (Arabic Literature and History of the Middle East)
- Occupation: Diplomat
- Known for: Israeli Ambassador to Finland, Estonia, South Africa, and Consul General in Mumbai

Dov Segev-Steinberg (Hebrew: דב שגב-שטיינברג; born 1956 in Tel Aviv) was an Israeli diplomat who lastly held the position of Chargé d'affairs at the Israel embassy in Myanmar. In his previous diplomatic position he was the Israeli Ambassador to Finland and non-resident Ambassador to Estonia. He was also Ambassador to South Africa from 2008 until 2013 and Consul General in Mumbai. In 2022, he became Chargé d'affaires in Myanmar.

The ambassador earned a combined degree in Arabic Literature and History of the Middle East from Tel Aviv University. He has been described as a “first-class cook.”
