= Naftali Tamir =

Israeli diplomat

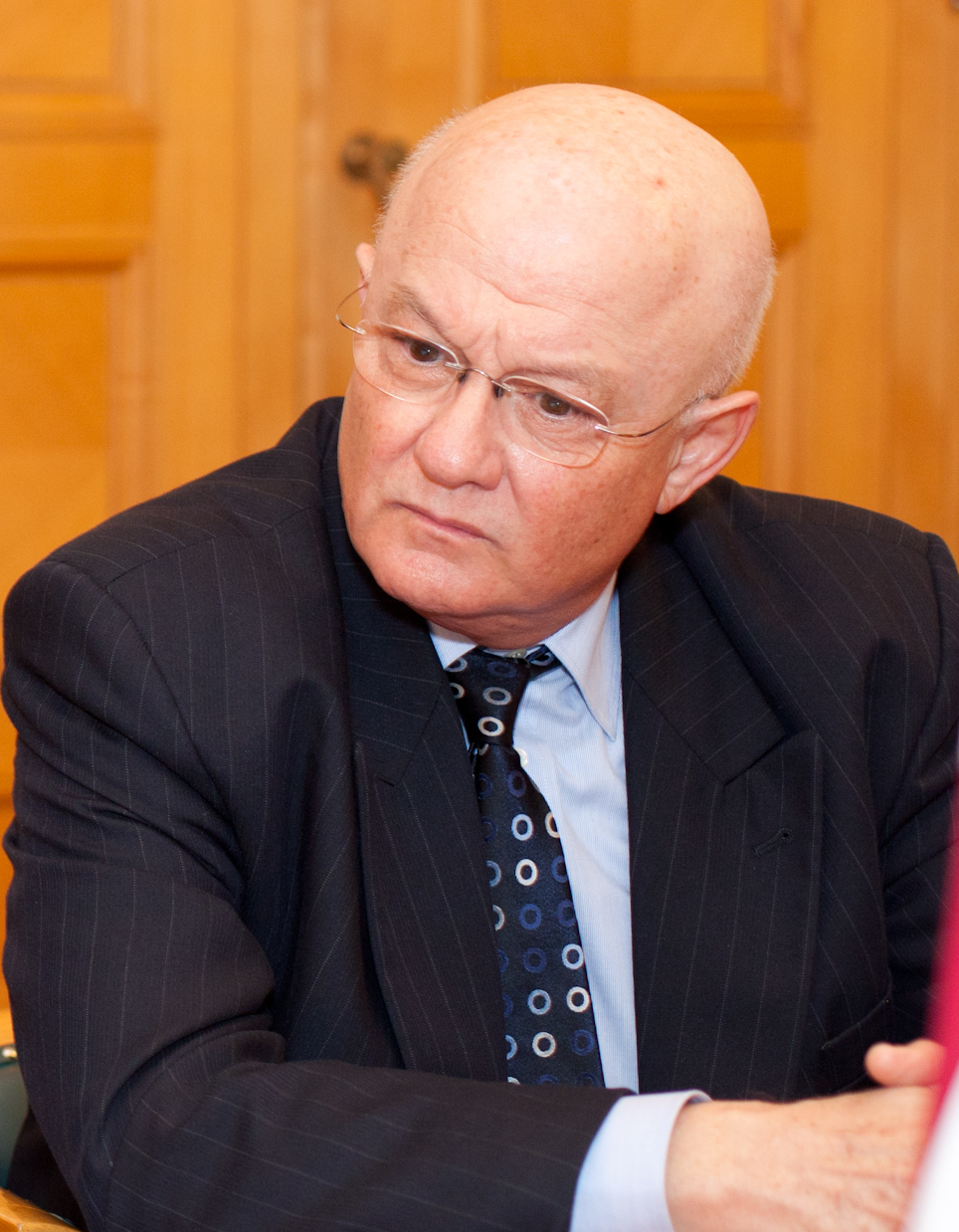

Israel Ambassador to New Zealand
- In office 2005–2007
- Succeeded by: Yuval Rotem

Israel Ambassador to Australia
- In office 2005–2007
- Preceded by: Gabby Levy
- Succeeded by: Irit Lillian

Israel Ambassador to Finland
- In office 1999–2000
- Preceded by: Ali Yahya
- Succeeded by: Miryam Shomrat

Personal details
- Occupation: Diplomat

Naftali Tamir (Hebrew: נפתלי תמיר) is an Israeli diplomat.

Naftali Tamir served as Ambassador to Australia and the non-resident ambassador to New Zealand from 2005 until 2007.

Tamir was recalled after commenting that Israel and Australia are "like sisters" because both are in Asia but their people do not have "yellow skin and slanted eyes" and Asia is "basically the yellow race". Tamir later said his remarks were taken out of context. He was cleared by the Foreign Ministry.

From 1999 until 2000, he was Ambassador to Finland.
