= Shmuel (Sammy) Revel =

Israeli politician

Shmuel (Sammy) Revel (Hebrew: שמואל (סמי) רבל; born 1963) is an Israeli diplomat who has served as Israel's ambassador to Bahrain since 2025. He previously served as the Israeli Ambassador to Cyprus from December 2017 to 2021.

Revel began his career with the Ministry of Foreign Affairs in 1987, serving in Manila, Philippines, the first Head of Mission of the Trade Representation Office of Israel in Doha, Qatar (for which he received the Foreign Ministry's Director General's Award of Excellence). His book "Israel at the Forefront of the Persian Gulf – The Story of an Israeli Mission in Qatar" was published in 2009.,

Revel earned a B.A. in Computer Science and Mathematics and an M.A. in philosophy, History and Sociology of Science from the Hebrew University of Jerusalem.,
