= Jamal Zahalka =

Israeli Arab politician

- جمال زحالقة
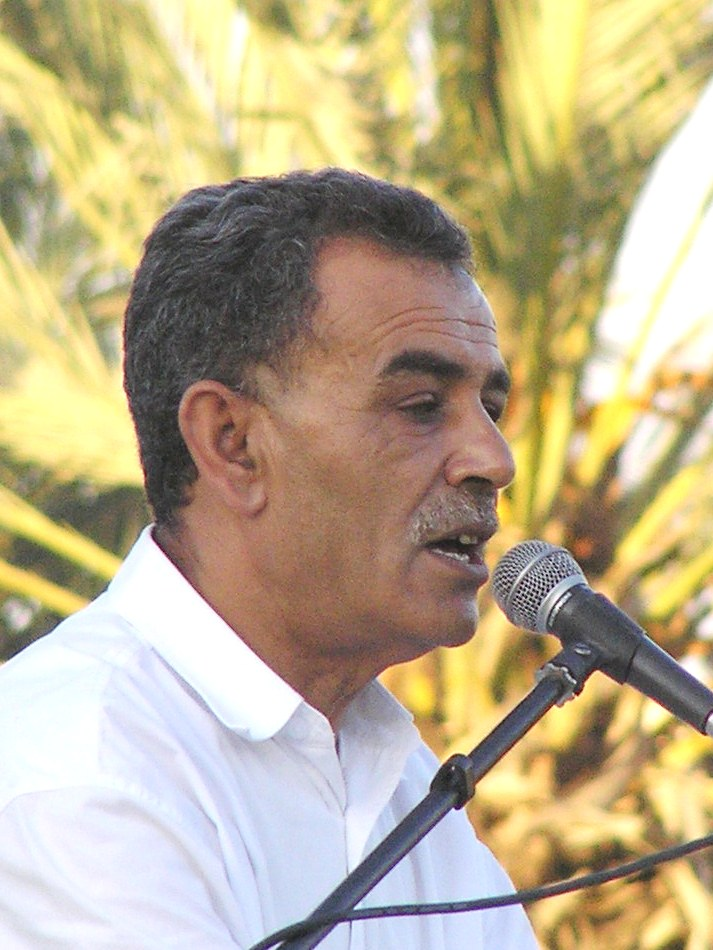

Faction represented in the Knesset
- 2003–2015: Balad
- 2015–2019: Joint List

Personal details
- Born: 11 January 1955 (age 71) Kafr Qara, Israel

Jamal Zahalka (Arabic: جمال زحالقة, romanized: Jamāl Zaḥalqa, Hebrew: ג'מאל זחאלקה; born 11 January 1955) is an Arab-Israeli politician. He served as a member of the Knesset for Balad between 2003 and 2019, and was leader of the party between 2007 and 2019.

== Biography ==
Zahalka was born in Kafr Qara. As a teenager, he participated in PLO activities in the town. He attended a Jewish high school in nearby Haifa. While in the middle of 12th grade, he was arrested over his PLO activities, as at the time the PLO was an outlawed organization. He was subsequently convicted and imprisoned for two years. He completed his matriculation in prison. After his release from prison, he studied pharmacy at the Hebrew University of Jerusalem. He earned a BA, MA and PhD. His doctoral thesis was on the physiological properties of hashish. He worked as a pharmacist prior to his entry into politics.

Zahalka was active in Arab and left-wing groups, and in the communist Maki party. For a time, he studied in East Germany, and returned to Israel in 1989. He later joined the Balad party, having met its founder Azmi Bishara at university in 1977. He was elected to the Knesset on Balad's list in 2003, and was re-elected in 2006. After Bishara fled the country, Zahalka became party leader in 2007. He was subsequently re-elected in 2009, 2013 and 2015. He stepped down as party leader prior to the April 2019 elections and left the Knesset. In 2025, he was elected chairman of the Higher Arab Monitoring Committee.

Zahalka lives in Kafr Qara and is married with five children. He is an atheist.

== Views on the treatment of Palestinians by Israel ==
Zahalka describes Israel's political discourse about the Palestinians as revolving around the ideas of separation, apartheid, and transfer. He argues that an apartheid system is already in place, with the West Bank and Gaza Strip separated into "cantons," and Palestinians required to carry permits to travel between them.

== See also ==
- List of Arab members of the Knesset
