= List of ambassadors of Israel to Finland =

The Ambassador from Israel to Finland is Israel's foremost diplomatic representative in Finland

== List of ambassadors ==
- Hagit Ben-Yaakov 2020 -
- Dov Segev-Steinberg 2016 - 2020
- Dan Ashbel 2011 - 2016
- Avi Avraham Granot 2007 - 2011
- Shemi Tzur 2003 - 2007
- Miryam Shomrat 2000 - 2003
- Naftali Tamir 1999 - 2000
- Ali Yahya 1996 - 1999
- Moshe Gilboa 1994 - 1996
- Yosef Haseen 1990 - 1994
- Asher Naim1988 - 1990
- Mordechai Lador 1985 - 1988
- Yehuda Horam1981 - 1985
- Rehavam Amir 1979 - 1981
- Yohanan Cohen 1976 - 1979
- Arieh Eilan 1973 - 1977
- Katriel Katz 1972 - 1973
- Moshe Avidan 1964 - 1968
- Yehuda Gaulan 1960 - 1964
- Charge d'Affaires a.i. Eytan Ruppin
- Charge d'Affaires a.i. Avigdor Shoham
- Minister Avraham Nissan (Non-Resident, Stockholm) 1950 - 1956
