= 'Ara =

'Ara: עָרָה, עארה; عاره
- Local council
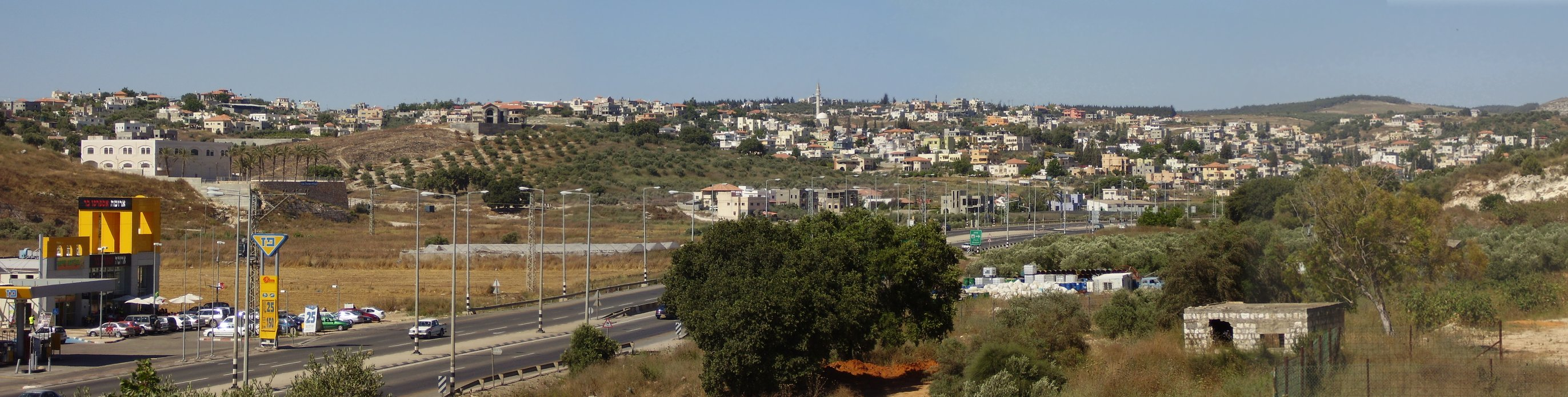
- Panoramic view from the west, photographed from a hill to the south of highway 65.

- Location within Haifa region of Israel Location within Israel
- Coordinates: 32°30′20″N 35°04′41″E
- Grid position: 157/212 PAL
- Country: Israel
- District: Haifa
- Name meaning: "Khurbet Arah": the ruin of ’Arah (personal name)

'Ara (Hebrew: עָרָה; Arabic: عاره) is a village in the Haifa District in northern Israel, located in the Wadi Ara valley. Since 1985, 'Ara has been part of the Ar'ara local council. It is located north of highway 65, between Ar'ara and Kfar Qara. Its population of 4,600 (as of 2004) is almost entirely Muslim.

== History ==
Burial caves along with white mosaic pavements have been excavated at the village.

Pottery remains from the Middle Bronze IIb and forward have been found here.

Some of the burial caves have been dated to the Middle and Late Bronze Ages and the Roman era. Byzantine lamps, glass vases and ceramics have also been found.

A building from the Umayyad era have been excavated in the village. It included many pottery objects and a glass jar, all from the same period.

=== Ottoman Empire ===
'Ara, like the rest of Palestine, was incorporated into the Ottoman Empire in 1517, and in the census of 1596, the village appeared in the tax registers as being in the Nahiya of Shara of the Liwa of Lajjun. It had a population of 2 Muslim households and paid a fixed tax rate of 25% on wheat, barley, vines, and goats or beehives; a total of 1,800 akçe.

In 1882, PEF's Survey of Western Palestine noted "traces of ruins on a prominent mound with a well."

=== British Mandate ===
In the 1922 census of Palestine conducted by the British Mandate authorities, 'Arah had a population 372, all Muslims

This had increased at the time of the 1931 census to 673 Muslims, in 115 occupied houses.

In the 1945 statistics, 'Ara was counted with Ar'ara, together they had a population of 2,290 Muslims, of which 800 were in 'Ara.

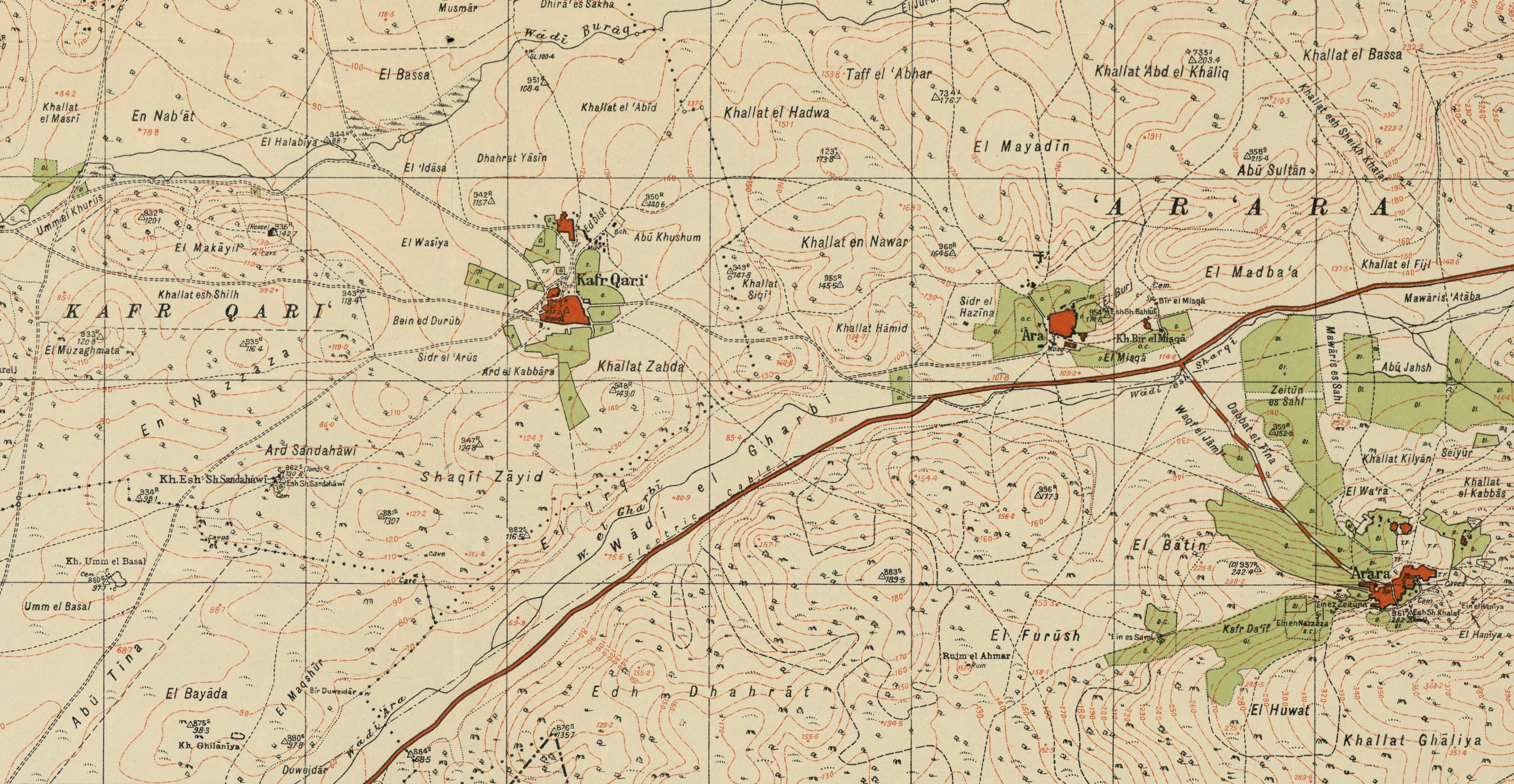
'Ara 1942 1:20,000

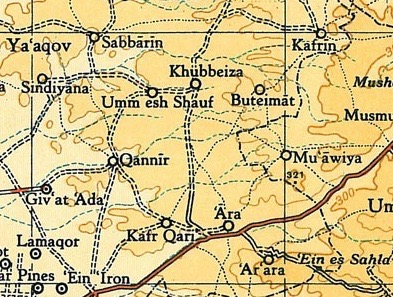
'Ara 1945 1:250,000

=== Israel ===
'Ara was merged with the neighboring Ar'ara in 1985.

== Bibliography ==
- Abu Hamid, Amani (2010-11-17). "Kh. 'Ara (South) Final Report". Hadashot Arkheologiyot – Excavations and Surveys in Israel (122).
- Barron, J.B., ed. (1923). Palestine: Report and General Abstracts of the Census of 1922. Government of Palestine.
- Conder, C.R.; Kitchener, H.H. (1882). The Survey of Western Palestine: Memoirs of the Topography, Orography, Hydrography, and Archaeology. Vol. 2. London: Committee of the Palestine Exploration Fund.
- Dauphin, C. (1998). La Palestine byzantine, Peuplement et Populations. BAR International Series 726 (in French). Vol. III : Catalogue. Oxford: Archeopress. ISBN 0-860549-05-4.
- Department of Statistics (1945). Village Statistics, April, 1945. Government of Palestine.
- Hütteroth, W.-D.; Abdulfattah, K. (1977). Historical Geography of Palestine, Transjordan and Southern Syria in the Late 16th Century. Erlanger Geographische Arbeiten, Sonderband 5. Erlangen, Germany: Vorstand der Fränkischen Geographischen Gesellschaft. ISBN 3-920405-41-2.
- Massarwa, Abdallah (2010-07-12). "Khirbat 'Ara". Hadashot Arkheologiyot – Excavations and Surveys in Israel (122).
- Massarwa, Abdallah (2010-10-03). "Khirbat 'Ara Final Report". Hadashot Arkheologiyot – Excavations and Surveys in Israel (122).
- Mills, E., ed. (1932). Census of Palestine 1931. Population of Villages, Towns and Administrative Areas. Jerusalem: Government of Palestine.
- Palmer, E.H. (1881). The Survey of Western Palestine: Arabic and English Name Lists Collected During the Survey by Lieutenants Conder and Kitchener, R. E. Transliterated and Explained by E.H. Palmer. Committee of the Palestine Exploration Fund.
- Zertal, A. (2016). The Manasseh Hill Country Survey: From Nahal 'Iron to Nahal Shechem. Vol. 3. Brill. ISBN 978-9004312302.
