= Yosef Levi-Sfari =

Israeli diplomat

Yosef Levi-Sfari (Hebrew: יוסי לוי-ספרי; Rehovot, 8 August 1972) is an Israeli diplomat.

== Life ==
He studied laws at the Hebrew University of Jerusalem with a Master in Conflict Research, Management and Resolution in 2016 at the same university.

He was the Deputy Head of Mission and Consul at the Embassy of Israel in Montevideo, Uruguay (2007-2010) and worked for the Embassy of Israel in Ankara (2011-2015). Between 2017-2023, he has been General Consul in Istanbul, Turkey. On April 2, 2023 he was appointed Ambassador of Israel to Bulgaria.
