= List of ambassadors of Israel to Turkey =

The Ambassador from Israel to Turkey is Israel's foremost diplomatic representative in Turkey.

== List of ambassadors ==
Ambassadors are resident in Ankara and head the embassy.

Ambassador	Term start	Term end
Irit Lillian	2022	2026
Vacant	The position was vacant during this period as Turkey severed diplomatic relations with Israel.	
Eitan Na'eh	2016	2018
Amira Oron	2015	2016
Yosef Levi-Sfari	2011	2015
Gabby Levy	2007	2011
Pinchas Avivi	2003	2007
David Sultan	2001	2003
Ori Brener	1998	2001
Zvi Elpeleg	1995	1997
David Granit	1993	1995
Uri-Mordechay Gordon	1990	1993
Dr. Abraham Cohen	1986	1990
Eli Shaked	1983	1985
Shimon Amir	1978	1980
Shmuel Divon	1975	1977
Shaul Bar-Haim	1971	1975
Moshe Sasson	1960	1966
Minister Maurice Fischer	1953	1957
Minister Eliyahu Sasson	1950	1952

== List of consuls general ==
Consuls general are resident in Istanbul, head the consulate general, and are mostly responsible for consular affairs.

Consul general	Term start	Term end
Rami Hatan	2023	
Yosef Levi-Sfari	2017	2023
Shai Cohen	2014	2017
Moshe Kimhi	2009	2014
Mordehai Amihai Bivas	2005	2009
