= Nawaf Massalha =

Arab Israeli politician (1943–2021)

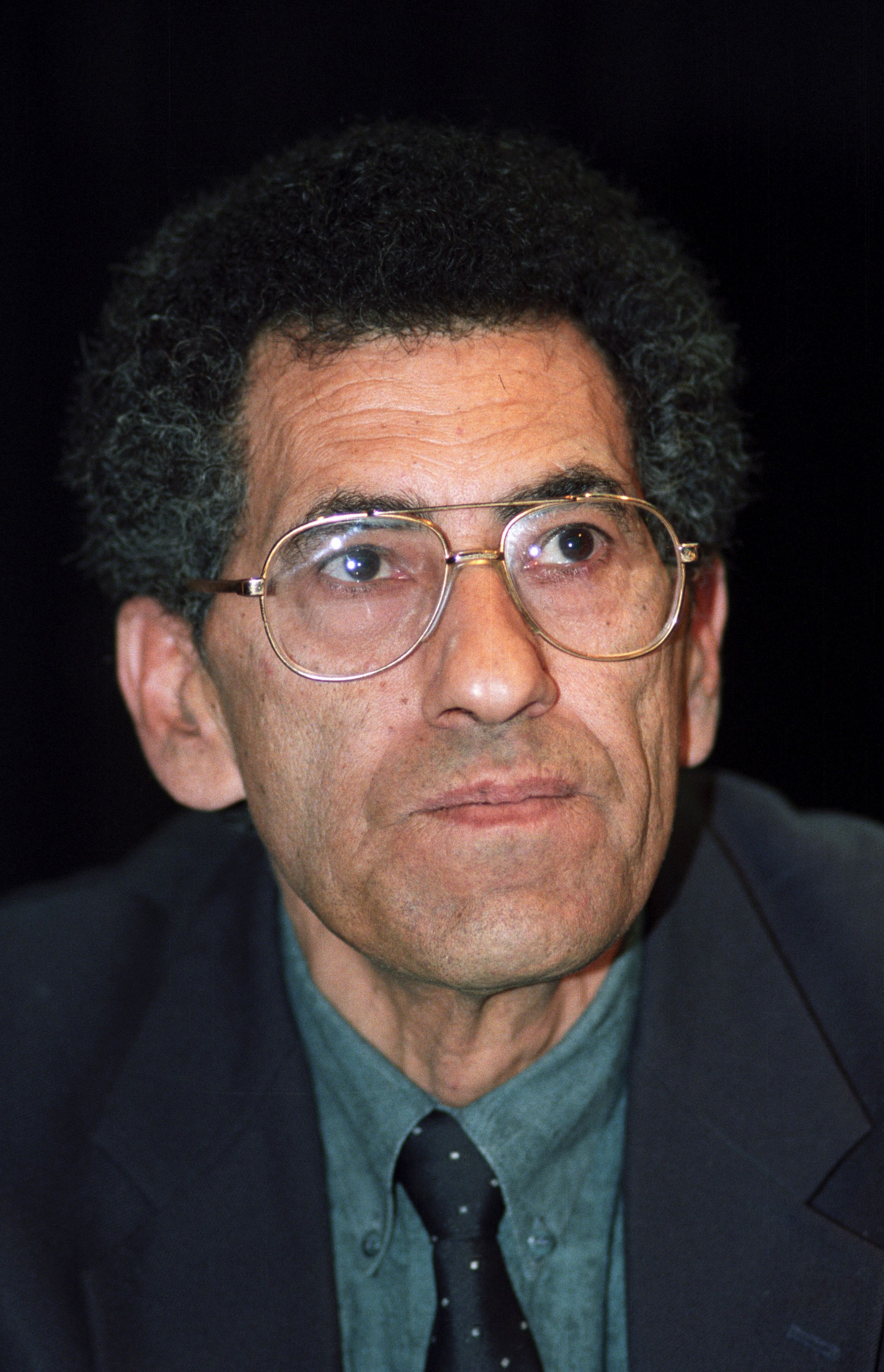

Faction represented in the Knesset
- 1988–1991: Alignment
- 1991–1999: Labor Party
- 1999–2001: One Israel
- 2001–2003: Labor Party

Personal details
- Born: 26 November 1943 Kafr Qara, Mandatory Palestine
- Died: 26 October 2021 (aged 77)

Nawaf Massalha (Arabic: نواف مصالحة, Hebrew: נואף מסאלחה; 26 November 1943 – 26 October 2021, also spelt Nawaf Mazalha or Nawaf Masalha) was an Israeli Arab politician and a member of the Knesset. He became the first Muslim Arab to hold a ministerial position in the Israeli government when he was appointed Deputy Minister of Health by Yitzhak Rabin in 1992.

== Background ==
Massalha was born in the town of Kafr Qara during the Mandate era. He attended Tel Aviv University, gaining a BA, and worked as a teacher. He was married and father of five children.

== Political career ==
Massalha joined the Alignment and was elected to the Knesset in the 1988 election. In his first term, he was made Deputy Speaker of the Knesset. He retained his seat in the 1992 election as a member of the Labor Party (which the Alignment had merged into) and became Deputy Minister of Health in Yitzhak Rabin's government.

Despite Labor's failing in the 1996 election, Massalha retained his seat again, as he did in Labor's more successful 1999 election campaign. He was appointed Deputy Minister of Foreign Affairs in Ehud Barak's government. However, he lost his seat in the 2003 election.

Massalha died from COVID-19 in October 2021.
