= List of ambassadors of Israel to Estonia =

The Ambassador from Israel to Estonia is Israel's foremost diplomatic representative in Estonia.

== List of ambassadors ==
- Dov Segev-Steinberg (Non-Resident, Helsinki) 2016–present
- Dan Ashbel (Non-Resident, Helsinki) 2011–2016
- Avi Avraham Granot (Non-Resident, Helsinki) 2007–2011
- Shemi Tzur
