= List of ambassadors of Israel to Fiji =

== List of ambassadors ==
- Tibor Shalev-Schlosser (Non-Resident, Jerusalem) 2016–present
- Yuval Rotem 2007–2013
- Shmuel Moyal 1993–1995
- Zohar Raz 1988–1991
- Avraham Kidron (Non-Resident, Canberra) 1979–1982
- Michael Elizur (Non-Resident, Canberra) 1974–1979
- Moshe Erell (Non-Resident, Canberra) 1970–1974
