= Irit Lillian =

Israeli diplomat (born 1962)

- אירית ליליאן

Israel Ambassador to Turkey
- In office 2022–2026
- Preceded by: Eitan Naeh

Israel Ambassador to Bulgaria
- In office 2015–2019
- Preceded by: Shaul Raz Kasima
- Succeeded by: Yoram Elron

Israel Ambassador to Australia
- In office 2007–2007
- Preceded by: Naftali Tamir
- Succeeded by: Yuval Rotem

Personal details
- Born: 1962 (age 63–64) Rehovot
- Education: Hebrew University, Tel Aviv University
- Occupation: Diplomat

Irit Lillian (Hebrew: אירית ליליאן; born 1962, in Rehovot, Israel) is a former Israeli diplomat, who served as the Israeli Ambassador to Turkey and the Ambassador to Bulgaria.

When Naftali Tamir was recalled as Ambassador to Australia, Lillian became the Chargé d'affaires.

During her military service, Lillian was a producer and an editor in the Israeli Army Radio station Galei Tsahal. She earned a B.A in Archaeology and Egyptology from the Tel Aviv University and M.A in Eastern and Western Studies in the HUJ.

Lillian joined the Israeli Ministry of Foreign Affairs in 1986. She was appointed the Israeli Ambassador to Turkey and ultimately served as the charge d'affaires at Ankara Embassy.
