= Gabby Levy =

Israeli diplomat

Gabby Levy (Hebrew: גבי לוי) is an Israeli diplomat who served as Ambassador to Turkey until he was expelled in 2011 “in the aftermath of last year’s deadly Israeli raid on a Turkish ship leading an aid flotilla to Gaza.” He also served as Ambassador to Australia.

Gabby Levy was born in Bergama in 1944 and immigrated to Israel with his family in early 1949 at the age of four. He received his BA from Tel Aviv University in Middle Eastern history and geography, and his MA from Bar-Ilan University.
