= Ali Yahya =

Israeli politician (1947–2014)

- علی یحیی
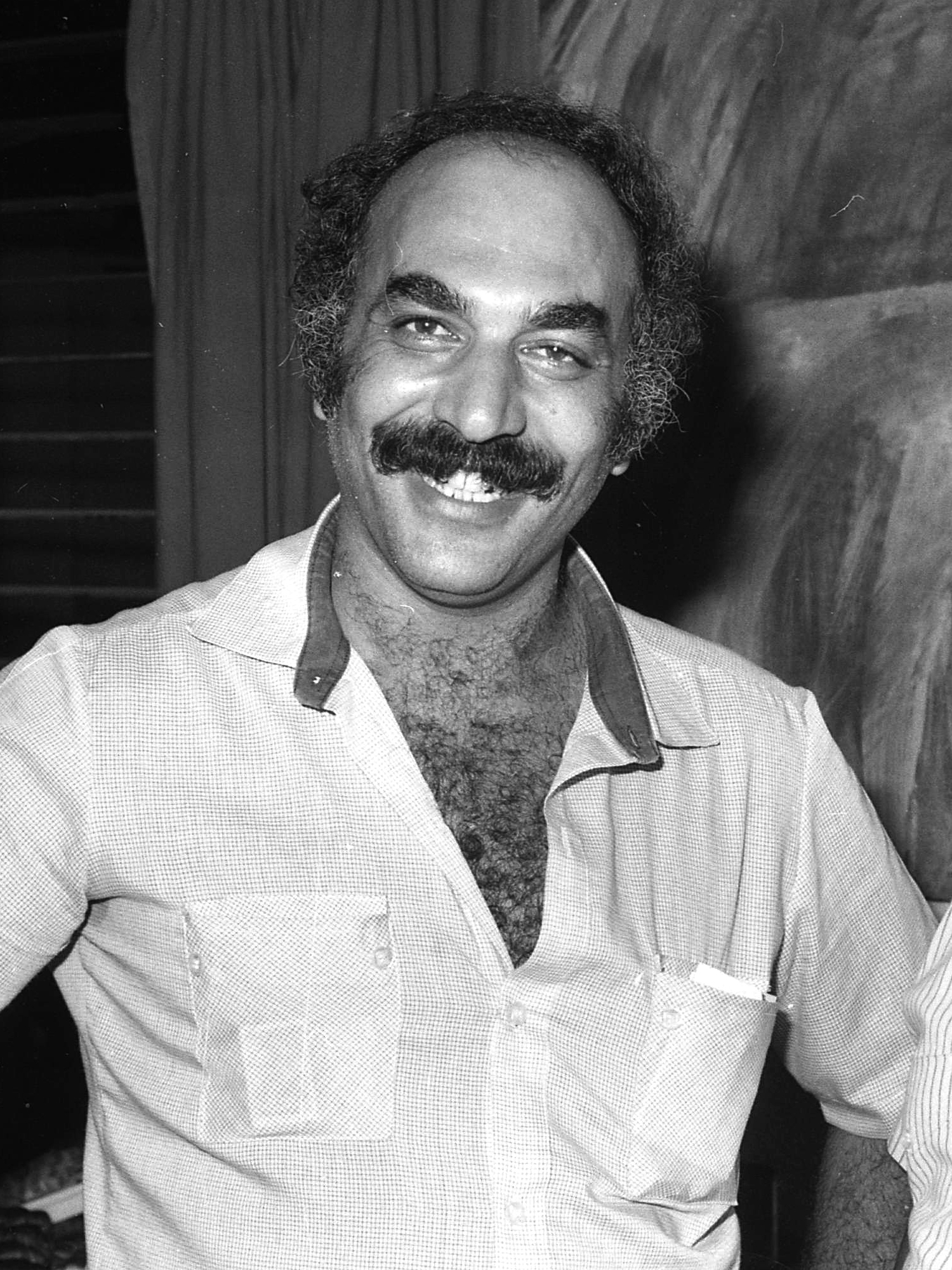
- Yahya in 2010

Israel Ambassador to Finland
- In office 1995–1999

Israel Ambassador to Greece
- In office 2006–2014

Personal details
- Born: 1947 Kafr Qara, Mandatory Palestine
- Died: 11 September 2014 (aged 66–67) Kafr Qara, Israel
- Spouse: Cherry Yahya
- Children: 5
- Occupation: Ambassador
- Profession: Diplomat
- Website: aliyahya.org

Ali Yahya (Arabic: علی یحیی, Hebrew: עלי יחיא; 1947 – 11 September 2014) was an Israeli Arab diplomat. He became the first Israeli ambassador of Arab descent in 1995 when he was appointed Ambassador to Finland, a post in which he served until 1999. Yahya served as Israeli Ambassador to Greece from 2006 to 2014.

== Biography ==
Yahya was born in 1947 in Kafr Qara, Mandatory Palestine, and raised there. He completed his BA degree in history and Arabic literature at the Hebrew University of Jerusalem in 1970. Yahya lived with his wife and five children.

Yahya was Israel's first Arab ambassador, first to Finland, later to Greece.

Yahya was awarded the Israeli title of ‘Ambassador For Life', an award provided by the Israeli Ministry of Foreign Affairs. As of 2020, only five diplomats held this title.

== Diplomatic and media career ==
Prior to becoming an ambassador, Yahya was the coordinator of the Israeli Foreign Ministry's Special Projects Division for the Middle East and the Peace Process.

From 1972 to 1995, Yahya was director-general and taught Arabic language and Arab culture at the Akiva Language Institute (Ulpan Akiva) language seminary in Netanya. He was a lecturer at the Tel Aviv University, the Israeli Senior Police College, and the Israel Foreign Ministry Cadet Training Program.

In 1995, Yahya became a member of the board of directors of the Israel Broadcasting Authority (IBA), where he was in charge of Arabic and radio programs. That year he also joined the Lapid Movement for Learning the Lessons of the Holocaust. Later in 1995 he was appointed the Israeli ambassador to Finland. Joined by his wife and children, he served until 1999.

In 1999, he served as coordinator and advisor for special projects (P.T.P.), at the department for the Middle East Peace Process and was directly responsible for the Aqaba Eilat peace talks.

In 2000, he became chairman of the Board of The Arab Institute, at Central Galilee College; chairman of the board at The Abraham Fund dedicated to advancing coexistence, equality and cooperation between Israel's Jewish and Arab citizens; member of the board of trustees at The Harry S. Truman Research Institute for the Advancement of Peace and member of the board of trustees at The Max Stern Academic College of Emek Yezreel.

In 2006, Yahya was appointed the Israeli ambassador to Greece.

On a visit to Singapore in 2006, Yahya called for direct ties between Israel and Indonesia. In an interview to the Jakarta Post he said,

I misunderstand why the relationship between the majorities of Muslims in Asia is hostile to Israel. If it is because of Israel and Palestine, then (how can it be reconciled that) we have peace with Jordan, Egypt, Morocco, but not with eastern Asia?

We protect the holy places in Israel, respect the Arabic language, and bring imams and rabbis together to have discussions. I am posing a question if the Muslim countries in Asia can open the gate to their country for us, so that we can open up relations with them.

There are so many opportunities in Israel and by stressing the need for cooperation we would like to get these countries to also have a share of these opportunities. But to do that, we need to have the opportunity to talk directly to these countries, which I hope, will come up soon.

Yahya was the first Israeli–Arab to light the ceremonial torch at the Israeli Independence Day celebration, and was the delegate of the Israeli – Arab Community at the Nobel Prize Ceremony in 1995.

Yahya died on 11 September 2014 in Kafr Qara.

== Awards and recognition ==
Yahya received a number of awards in recognition of his work.

- Knesset Speaker's Prize (1983) for quality of the environment.
- In 1986, was representative of Ulpan Akiva, recipient of the Israel Prize.
- Histadrut (Israeli Labor Union) Prize for Coexistence (1993).
- In 1994, he received recognition from the U.S. Senate for "Promotion of Peace through Language and Culture."
