= Shemi Tzur =

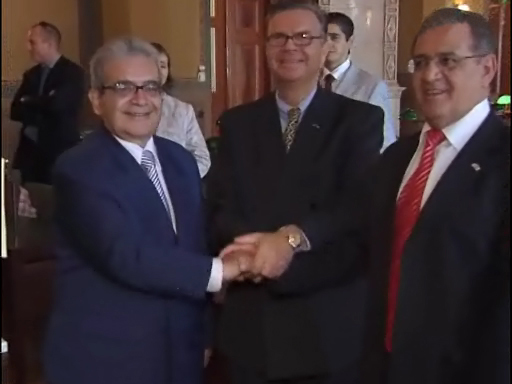
Palestine delegate to Finland Nabil Alwazir, President of Children's United Parliament of the World Jyrki Arolinna and Ambassador of Israel Shemi Tzur

Shemi Tzur (Hebrew: שמי צור; born January 21, 1945) is a retired Israeli ambassador who has had ambassadorships in Cyprus (1993–2000), New Zealand (2010–2013), Turkmenistan (2013–2015) (one source says he was “Israel's first-ever ambassador to Turkmenistan” even though the Ministry of Foreign Affairs lists two earlier non resident ambassadors), Finland (2003–2007), and Estonia. He has also been Consul at the Consulate General of Israel in Sydney, Acting Ambassador to Fiji and Chargé d'affaires ad interim, Acting Ambassador to Angola and Mozambique, Ambassador Non-resident to Armenia, Kyrgyzstan, Tonga, Samoa and Cook Islands and “opened the Embassy of Israel in Uzbekistan and was instrumental in the establishment of diplomatic relations between the two countries.“

From 1968 until 1971, he studied Jewish history at the Hebrew University of Jerusalem.
