= Ar'ara =

Arab town in northern Israel

Ar'ara: עַרְעָרָה; عرعرة
- Local council (from 1970)

Hebrew transcription(s)
  - ISO 259: ʕarˁara
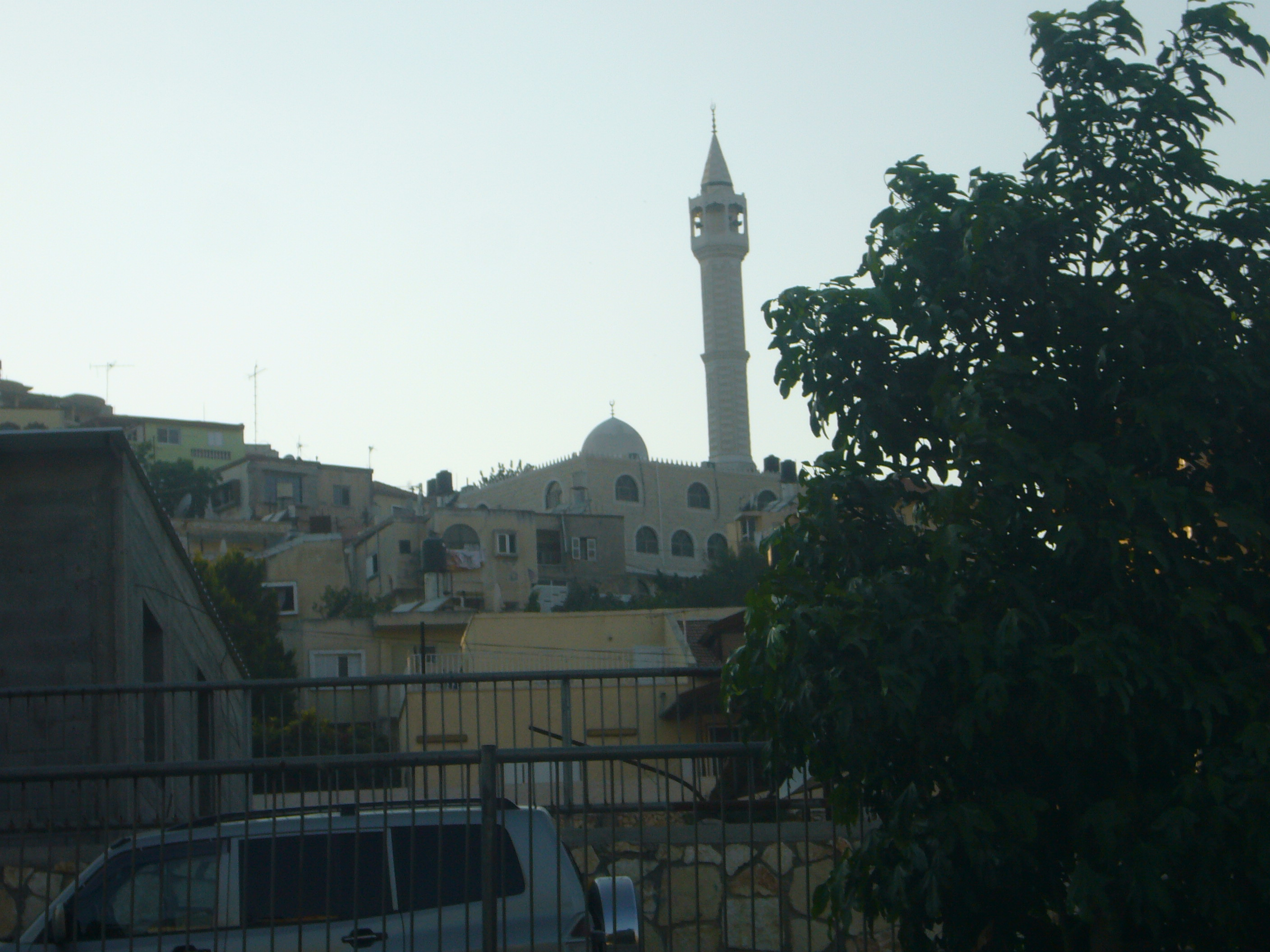
- Mosque in Ar'ara

- Location within Haifa region of Israel Location within Israel
- Coordinates: 32°29′40″N 35°05′39″E
- Grid position: 159/211 Israel grid
- Country: Israel
- District: Haifa
- Subdistrict: Hadera
- Natural Region: Alexander Mountain

Population (2024)
  - Total: 20,734
- Name meaning: "The juniper tree"

Ar'ara (Arabic: عرعرة, Hebrew: עַרְעָרָה; lit. "Juniper tree") is an Arab town in the Wadi Ara region in northern Israel. It is located southwest of Umm al-Fahm just northwest of the Green Line, and is part of the Triangle. In 2024, the population was 20,734.

== History ==
Pottery sherds from Persian period have been found here. Burial complexes from the Roman period have been excavated at Ar'ara, revealing clay lamps, glass vessels and beads, commonly used in the 1st to 4th century CE. Rock-cut tombs with niches, and Byzantine period ceramics have been found.

=== Middle Ages ===
In the Crusader period, the place was known as "Castellum Arearum". In the land allocation made by sultan Baybars in 663 H. (1265-1266 C.E.), Ar'ara was shared between his amirs Ala' al-Din and Sayf al-Din Bayhaq al-Baghdadi.

A few clay fragments from the Mamluk period have been found at the same location as the Roman remains.

=== Ottoman Empire ===
Ar'ara, like the rest of Palestine, was incorporated into the Ottoman Empire in 1517. During the 16th and 17th centuries, Musmus belonged to the Turabay Emirate (1517–1683), which encompassed also the Jezreel Valley, Haifa, Jenin, Beit She'an Valley, northern Jabal Nablus, Bilad al-Ruha/Ramot Menashe, and the northern part of the Sharon plain.

In 1596, Ar'ara appeared in Ottoman tax registers as being in the Nahiya of Sa'ra of the Liwa of Lajjun. It had a population of 8 Muslim households and paid a fixed tax rate of 25% on agricultural products, which included wheat, barley, summer crops, olives, and goats or beehives; a total of 9,000 akçe.

By the eighteenth century, the village remained in the administrative district of Lajjun, but the revenue of the place was farmed for the Mutasarrıf of Jaffa. In 1838, it was noted as a village in the Jenin district.

In the late nineteenth century, the site was described as:

A village of moderate size on high ground, with a spring to the east, a second to the west and a well to the south. There are rock cut tombs near. The population is stated by Consul Rogers (1859) as 400, the cultivation then being 30 feddans.

A population list from about 1887 showed that Ar'arah had about 600 inhabitants; all Muslims.

=== British Mandate ===
In the 1922 census of Palestine conducted by the British Mandate authorities, Ar'ara had a population 735, all Muslims. This had increased in the 1931 census to 971, still all Muslims, in 150 houses.

In the 1945 statistics, Ar'ara and Arah had a population of 2,290 Muslims, 1,490 in Ar'ara and 800 in 'Ara, and a privately owned land area of 29,537 dunums, in addition to 5,802 dunams of publicly owned land. Of this, 1,724 dunams were for plantations and irrigable land, 20,560 for cereals, while 33 dunams were built-up (urban) land.

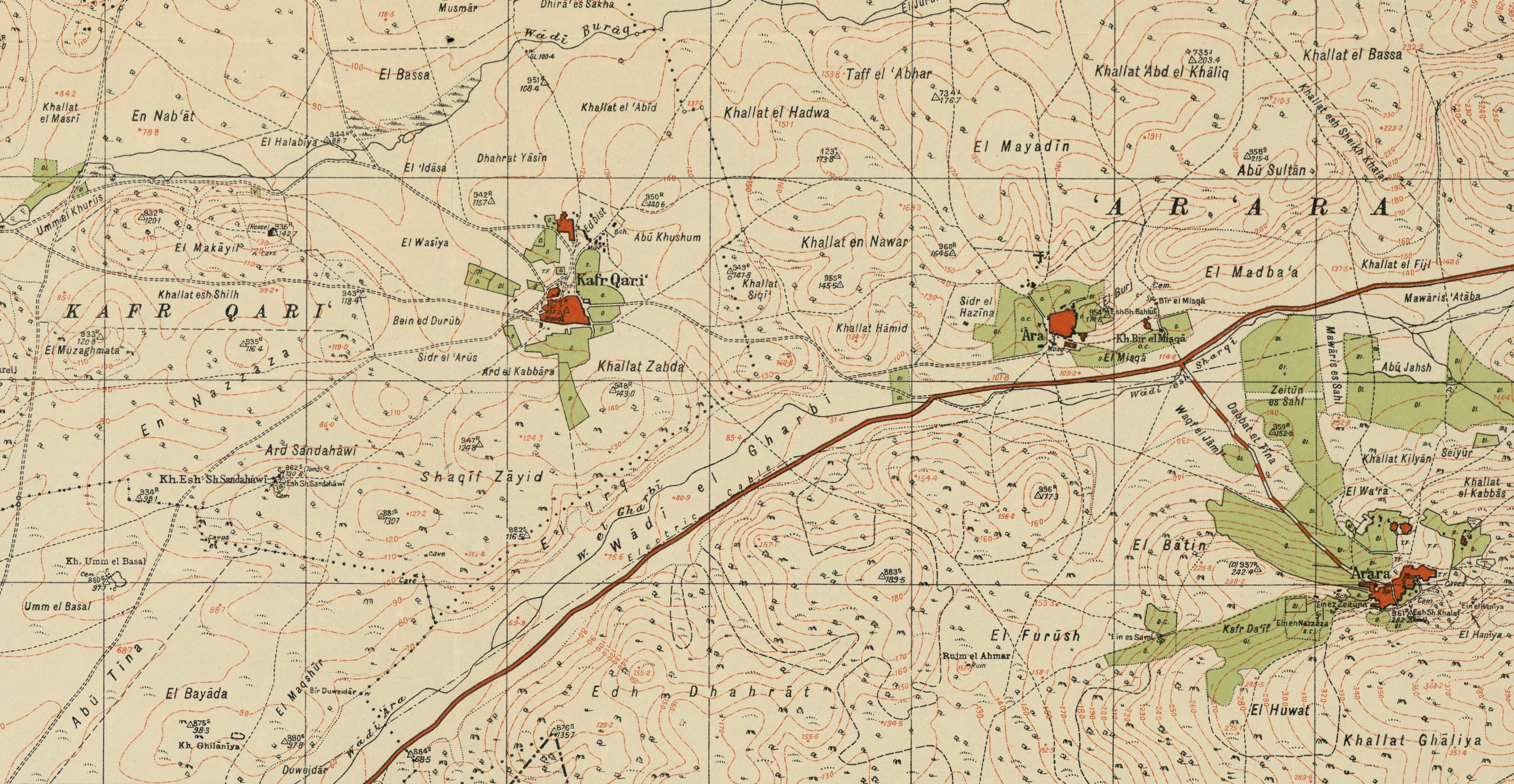
Ar'ara 1942 1:20,000

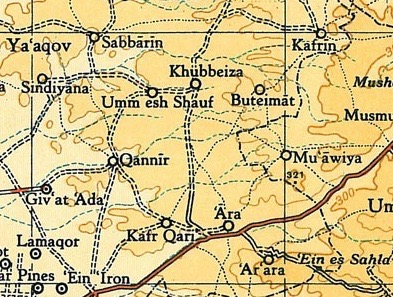
Ar'ara 1945 1:250,000

=== Israel ===
Ar'ara was transferred from Jordanian to Israeli jurisdiction in 1949 under the 1949 Armistice Agreements.

By 1962 the area had been reduced to 7,269 dunums, partly due to expropriations of 8,236 dunums by the Israeli government in 1953–54. One case of expropriation from a private landowner named Younis became a test case before the High Court of Israel in 1953, as the land had been expropriated by the government without notifying the owner. In 1954 the court ruled that the law did not require the owner to be notified and did not provide a right for the owner to contest the expropriation in advance. This ruling and one other effectively ended the possibility of land owners using the courts to contest the seizure of their land. The neighboring village of ʿAra was merged with Ar'ara in 1985.

== Maqam Shaykh Khalaf ==
Maqam Shaykh Khalaf is the only building which was noted by the Israel Antiquities Authority in the Mandate area, and it is located on a slope by the highest point in the village, set in the middle of extensive graveyards. The Maqam is a single rectangular chamber, covered by a dome. The two top courses are chamfered towards the dome. On the north side is a doorway, and double window set inside shallow arches. There is also a set of windows on the west side. Inside, there are three cenotaphs, located east-west, close to the west wall. A mihrab is located on the south wall. The date of the building is not known, but according to A. Petersen (who inspected the place in 1994), the architecture indicate an eighteenth or early nineteenth century date.

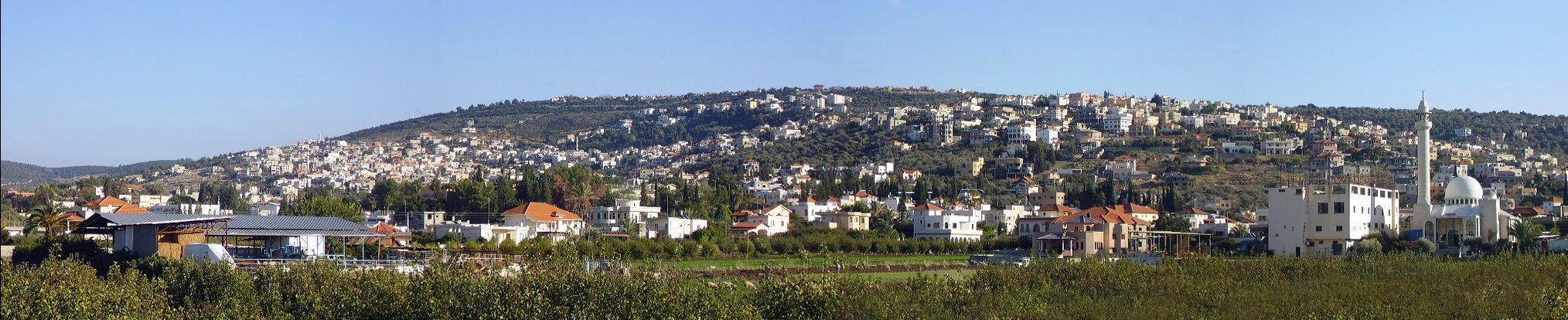
Panoramic view

== Demographics ==
Historical population
Year	Pop.	±%
1972	3,800	—
1983	4,800	+26.3%
1995	11,900	+147.9%
2008	21,700	+82.4%
2022	19,919	−8.2%
2024	20,733	+4.1%

== Voting Patterns ==
In the 2022 election, 96 percent of voters in Ar'ara voted for the Arab parties, while 2 percent voted for the parties of the center-left coalition led by Yair Lapid and 1 percent voted for the parties of the right-wing coalition led by Benjamin Netanyahu. Among the voters for the Arab parties, 47 percent voted for Balad, while 27 percent voted for the Hadash–Ta'al list and 26 percent voted for Ra'am.

In the 2026 election, 97 percent of voters in Ar'ara voted for the Arab parties, while 2 percent voted for the parties of the center-left coalition led by Gadi Eisenkot and 0.3 percent voted for the parties of the right-wing coalition led by Benjamin Netanyahu. Among the voters for the Arab parties, 82 percent voted for the Joint List, while 18 percent voted for Ra'am. Voter turnout increased 66 percent from the 2022 election.

== See also ==
- Arab localities in Israel

== Bibliography ==
- Abel, F.M. (1938). Geographie de la Palestine. Vol. 2 Geographie Politique. Les villes. Librairie Lecoffre. (II, p. 88)
- Baedeker, K., 1867, Palestine and Syria. A Handbook for Travellers, Dulan & Co., London ( p. 299)
- Barron, J.B., ed. (1923). Palestine: Report and General Abstracts of the Census of 1922. Government of Palestine.
- Cohen, Amnon (1973). Palestine in the Eighteenth Century: Patterns of Government and Administration. Jerusalem: Magnes Press, Hebrew University. ISBN 1-59045-955-5. Cited in Petersen, (2001)
- Conder, C.R.; Kitchener, H.H. (1882). The Survey of Western Palestine: Memoirs of the Topography, Orography, Hydrography, and Archaeology. Vol. 2. London: Committee of the Palestine Exploration Fund.
- Dauphin, C. (1998). La Palestine byzantine, Peuplement et Populations. BAR International Series 726 (in French). Vol. III : Catalogue. Oxford: Archeopress. ISBN 0-860549-05-4.
- Department of Statistics (1945). Village Statistics, April, 1945. Government of Palestine.
- Gorzalczany, Amir; Mahajna, Shireen; Massarwa, Abdallah (2009-03-12). "'Ar'ara (Southwest) Final Report". Hadashot Arkheologiyot – Excavations and Surveys in Israel (121).
- Hadawi, S. (1970). Village Statistics of 1945: A Classification of Land and Area ownership in Palestine. Palestine Liberation Organization Research Center.
- Hartmann, R., (1910), 'Die Strasse von Damascus nach Kairo', ZDMG (=Zeitschrift des Deutschen Morgenlandische Gesellschaft), 64, ( pp. 665–702) (p. 700)
- Hütteroth, W.-D.; Abdulfattah, K. (1977). Historical Geography of Palestine, Transjordan and Southern Syria in the Late 16th Century. Erlanger Geographische Arbeiten, Sonderband 5. Erlangen, Germany: Vorstand der Fränkischen Geographischen Gesellschaft. ISBN 3-920405-41-2.
- Ibn al-Furat (1971). Jonathan Riley-Smith (ed.). Ayyubids, Mamluks and Crusaders: Selections from the "Tarikh Al-duwal Wal-muluk" of Ibn Al-Furat : the Text, the Translation. Vol. 2. Translation by Malcolm Cameron Lyons, Ursula Lyons. Cambridge: W. Heffer.
- Massarwa, Abdallah (2007-12-24). "Ar'ara Final Report". Hadashot Arkheologiyot – Excavations and Surveys in Israel (119).
- Massarwa, Abdallah (2009-03-12). "'Ar'ara (Southwest) Final Report". Hadashot Arkheologiyot – Excavations and Surveys in Israel (121).
- Massarwa, Abdallah (2011-07-06). "Ar'ara Final Report". Hadashot Arkheologiyot – Excavations and Surveys in Israel (123).
- Massarwa, Abdallah (2013-06-02). "'Ar'ara (Southwest), Qazir". Hadashot Arkheologiyot – Excavations and Surveys in Israel (125).
- Mills, E., ed. (1932). Census of Palestine 1931. Population of Villages, Towns and Administrative Areas. Jerusalem: Government of Palestine.
- Oren, Eliran; Kirzner, Dan (2013-06-13). "'Ar'ara, Survey". Hadashot Arkheologiyot – Excavations and Surveys in Israel (125).
- Oren, Eliran (2020-08-12). "Ar'ara". Hadashot Arkheologiyot – Excavations and Surveys in Israel (132).
- Palmer, E.H. (1881). The Survey of Western Palestine: Arabic and English Name Lists Collected During the Survey by Lieutenants Conder and Kitchener, R. E. Transliterated and Explained by E.H. Palmer. Committee of the Palestine Exploration Fund.
- Petersen, Andrew (2001). A Gazetteer of Buildings in Muslim Palestine (British Academy Monographs in Archaeology). Vol. 1. Oxford University Press. ISBN 978-0-19-727011-0.
- Robinson, E.; Smith, E. (1841). Biblical Researches in Palestine, Mount Sinai and Arabia Petraea: A Journal of Travels in the year 1838. Vol. 3. Boston: Crocker & Brewster.
- Schumacher, G. (1888). "Population list of the Liwa of Akka". Quarterly Statement - Palestine Exploration Fund. 20: 169–191.
- Zertal, A. (2016). The Manasseh Hill Country Survey. Vol. 3. Boston: BRILL. ISBN 978-9004312302.
