= Kafr Qara =

Kafr Qara: כַּפְר קַרִע; كَفْر قَرَع
- Local council

Hebrew transcription(s)
  - ISO 259: Kfar Qara
  - Also spelled: Kfar Qara (official); Kfar Qari (unofficial)
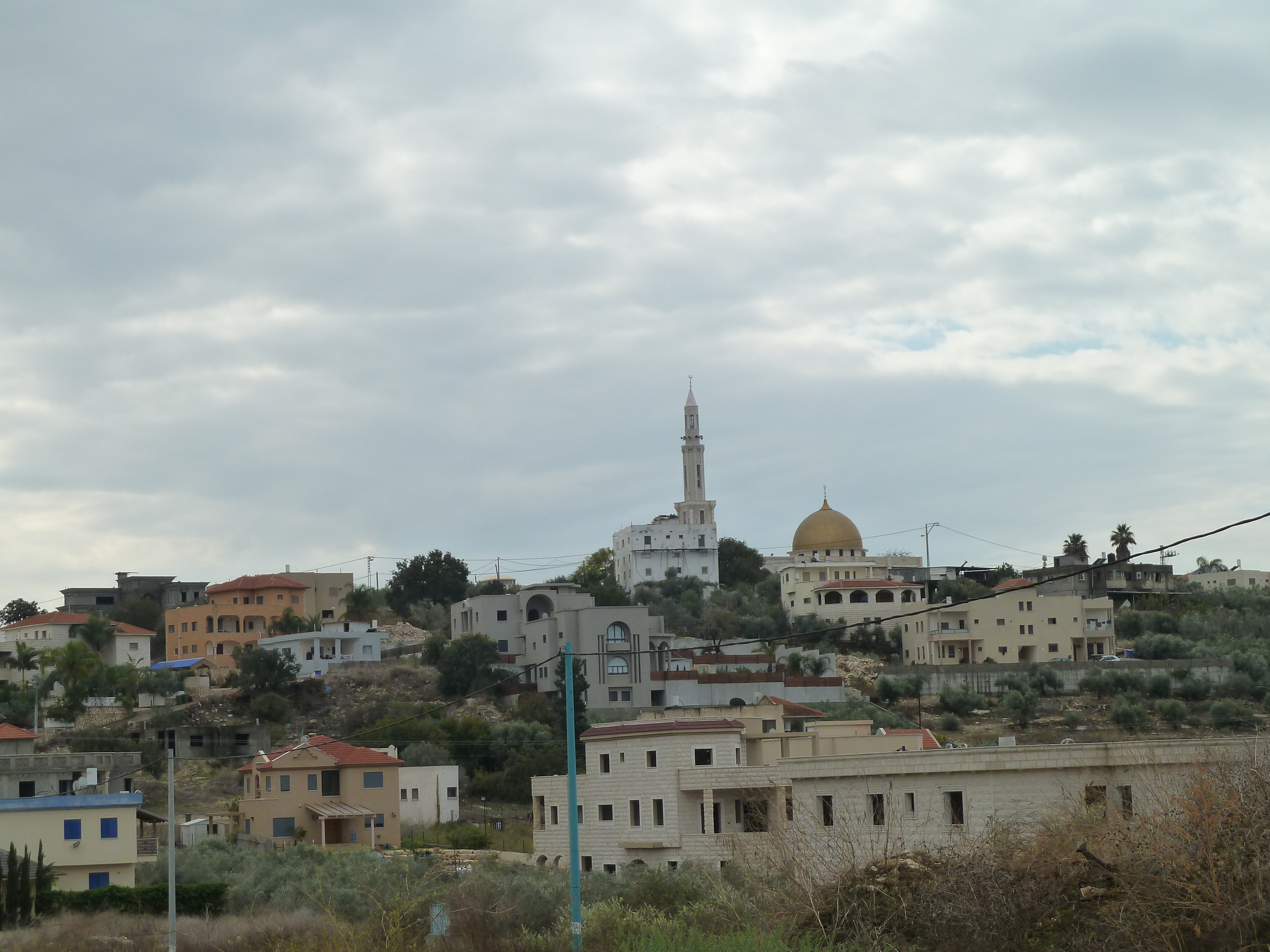

- Location within Haifa region of Israel Location within Israel
- Coordinates: 32°30′21″N 35°3′14″E
- Grid position: 155/212 PAL
- Country: Israel
- District: Haifa
- Subdistrict: Hadera
- Natural Region: Alexander Mountain

Government
  - Head of Municipality: Firas Badahi

Area
  - Total: 7,000 dunams (7.0 km^{2}; 2.7 sq mi)

Population (2024)
  - Total: 21,066
  - Density: 3,000/km^{2} (7,800/sq mi)
- Name meaning: "The village of the gourd"

Kafr Qara (Arabic: كَفْر قَرَع, Hebrew: כַּפְר קַרִע) is an Arab city in Israel 22 miles (35 km) southeast of Haifa. In 2024 its population was 21,066. Kafr Qara is part of the Triangle. It is located in the Wadi Ara region, northwest of the Green Line. Most of the inhabitants are Muslim. It is governed by a local council. Kafr Qara encompasses 7811 dunams of land. WAC, an independent labor association, has its headquarters there.

== History ==
=== Mamluk Sultanate ===
An early defter entry noted that Kafr Qara had been incorporated into the "Diwan of the Circassian sultanate" after it had been seized by ‘the Shaykhs of the mountain of Nablus’.

=== Ottoman Empire ===
Kafr Qara' was originally located on a rocky outcrop near Kafr Thilith in the West Bank (see: Uyun Kafr Qari'). It was incorporated into the Ottoman Empire in 1517 with the rest of Palestine, and in the defter no. 610, which was written soon after 1540, the revenue of Kafr Qara was designated to an endowment in Jerusalem; the Madrasah Al-Uthmaniyya. The whole of the revenue of Kafr Qara, a total of 3,400 aspers annually, belonged to this endowment.

In 1859 the population, having moved to the current location in Wadi 'Arab, was 450 people, who cultivated 32 feddans of land. In 1883, the PEF's Survey of Western Palestine (SWP) described Kefr Kara as a "good-sized stone village on high ground, with a well to the east, and caves."

A population list from about 1887 showed that Kiryat Kefr Kara had about 705 inhabitants, all Muslim.

=== British Mandate ===
In the 1922 census of Palestine conducted by the British Mandate authorities, Kufr Qara had a population 776; 767 Muslims and 9 Christians, where the Christians were 7 Roman Catholics and 2 Maronites. The population had increased by the 1931 census to 1,109; 4 Christians and 1,105 Muslims, in 198 houses.

In the 1945 statistics, Kafr Qara had a population of 1,510 Muslims, who owned 14,543 dunams of land. Of this, 227 dunams were for plantations and irrigable land, 11,516 for cereals, while 25 dunams were built-up (urban) land.

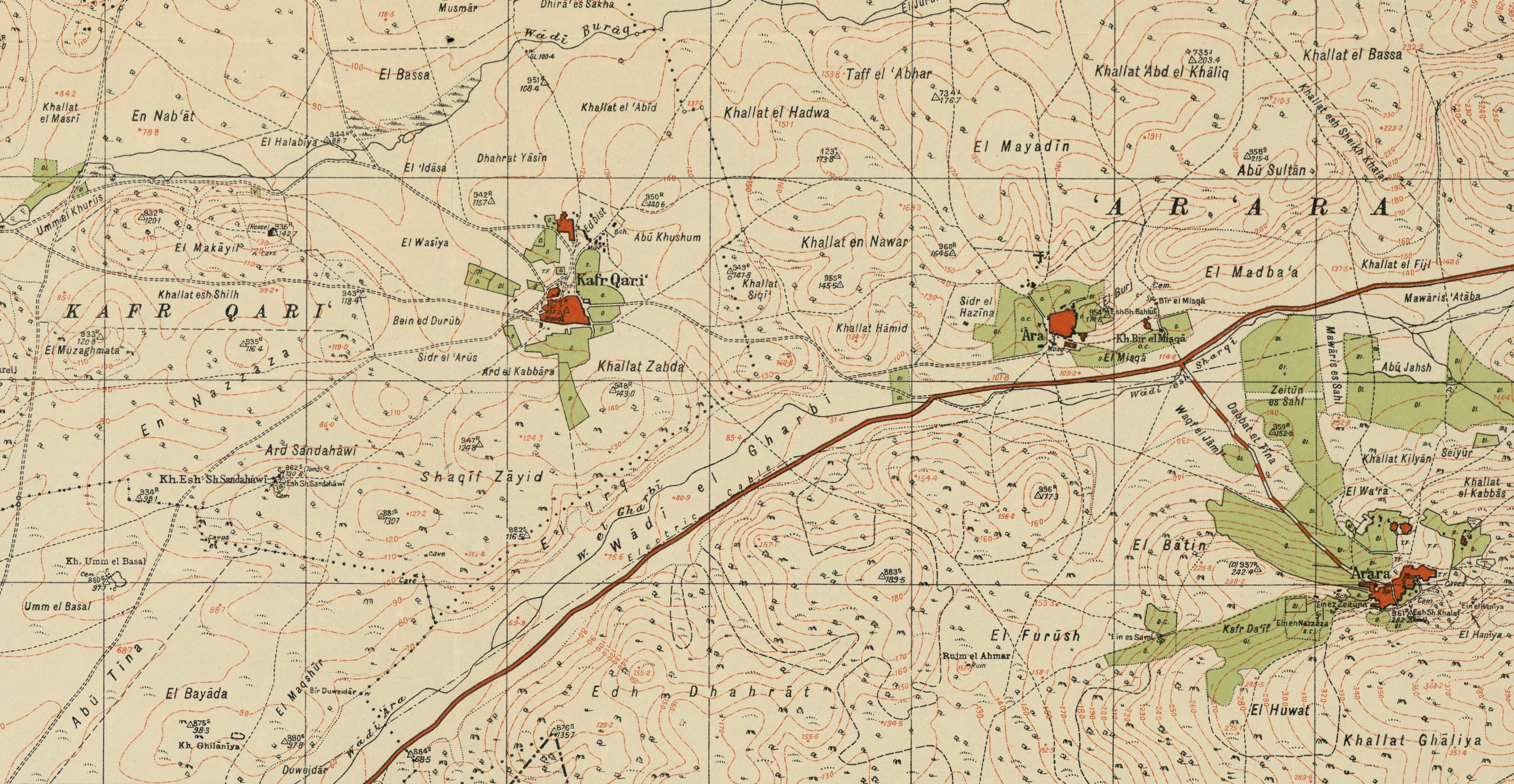
Kafr Qara 1942 1:20,000

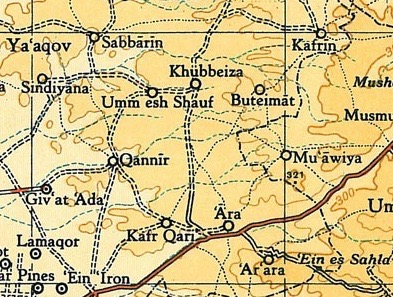
Kafr Qara 1945 1:250,000

=== Israel ===
In 2007, Qara held the record for doctors relative to population size, with around 14.8 doctors per 1,000 citizens.

== Education ==
In September 2003, a group of local parents founded a bilingual, multicultural elementary school in Kafr Qara, named Hand in Hand – Bridge over the Wadi, or "Bridge over the Wadi". Kafr Qara high school, established in 1970 as a vocational school, is now a comprehensive high school for 10th–12th graders from Kafr Qara and environs. The school has participated in multicultural projects such as Jitli, and offers a joint leadership program for Arab and Jewish teenagers.

Kafr Qara holds the highest record for doctors relative to population size in the country, around 14.8 doctors per 1,000 citizens (2007, with more than 50 medicine student back then), Kafr Qara known as well for recording a high rate of academics and master's degree holders.

== Demographics ==
Historical population
| Year | Pop. | ±% |
|---|---|---|
| 1972 | 5,000 | — |
| 1983 | 6,900 | +38.0% |
| 1995 | 10,500 | +52.2% |
| 2008 | 15,000 | +42.9% |
| 2022 | 19,890 | +32.6% |
| 2024 | 21,067 | +5.9% |

== Voting patterns ==
In the 2022 election, 97 percent of voters in Kafr Qara voted for the Arab parties, while 2 percent voted for the parties of the center-left coalition led by Yair Lapid and 1 percent voted for the parties of the right-wing coalition led by Benjamin Netanyahu. Among the voters for the Arab parties, 52 percent voted for Ra'am, while 28 percent voted for Balad and 20 percent voted for the Hadash–Ta'al list.

In the 2026 election, 97 percent of voters in Kafr Qara voted for the Arab parties, while 2 percent voted for the parties of the center-left coalition led by Gadi Eisenkot and 0.3 percent voted for the parties of the right-wing coalition led by Benjamin Netanyahu. Among the voters for the Arab parties, 56 percent voted for the Joint List, while 44 percent voted for Ra'am. Voter turnout increased 47 percent from the 2022 election.

== Notable people ==
- Nawaf Massalha, first Muslim to serve on the Israeli cabinet
- Ali Yahya (1947–2014), First Israeli Arab Ambassador of the state of Israel. Appointed ambassador in 1995 to Finland, and 2006 to Greece
- Jamal Zahalka, Arab member of Knesset, Balad chairman

== See also ==
- Ihud Bnei Kafr Qara F.C.
- Arab localities in Israel

== Bibliography ==
- Barron, J.B., ed. (1923). Palestine: Report and General Abstracts of the Census of 1922. Government of Palestine.
- Burgoyne, Michael Hamilton (1987). Mamluk Jerusalem. ISBN 090503533X.
- Conder, C.R.; Kitchener, H.H. (1882). The Survey of Western Palestine: Memoirs of the Topography, Orography, Hydrography, and Archaeology. Vol. 2. London: Committee of the Palestine Exploration Fund.
- Department of Statistics (1945). Village Statistics, April, 1945. Government of Palestine.
- Hadawi, S. (1970). Village Statistics of 1945: A Classification of Land and Area ownership in Palestine. Palestine Liberation Organization Research Center.
- Mills, E., ed. (1932). Census of Palestine 1931. Population of Villages, Towns and Administrative Areas. Jerusalem: Government of Palestine.
- Palmer, E.H. (1881). The Survey of Western Palestine: Arabic and English Name Lists Collected During the Survey by Lieutenants Conder and Kitchener, R. E. Transliterated and Explained by E.H. Palmer. Committee of the Palestine Exploration Fund.
- Schumacher, G. (1888). "Population list of the Liwa of Akka". Quarterly Statement - Palestine Exploration Fund. 20: 169–191.
