= Yuval Rotem =

Israeli diplomat (born 1959)

- יובל רותם
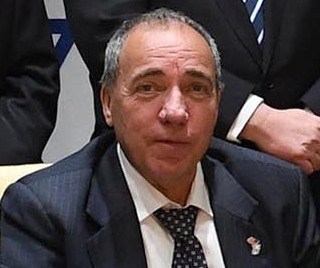
- Yuval Rotem at a conference of heads of Israeli embassies.

Director General, Israel Ministry of Foreign Affairs
- In office 2016 – June 2020
- Succeeded by: Alon Ushpiz

Personal details
- Born: March 21, 1959 (age 67) Tel Aviv, Israel
- Occupation: Ambassador
- Website: www.mfa.gov.il

Yuval Rotem (Hebrew: יובל רותם; born March 21, 1959) is an Israeli diplomat who is currently the Director General of the Israeli Ministry of Foreign Affairs.

== Biography ==
Yuval Rotem was born in Tel Aviv, Israel, to Rachel and Israel Frenkel, and grew up in Givatayim. Rotem attended his first years of school in a local school. He moved on to a regional high school, "Yironi Tet" in Tel Aviv. Rotem is fluent in Hebrew and English, and understands Italian.

Following his service in the Israel Defense Forces, he studied Political Science and International Relations at the Hebrew University of Jerusalem where he received his B.A. Degree with distinction. Rotem then participated in a special workshop for outstanding students at the Hebrew University of Jerusalem, and a special semester for outstanding students in Georgetown University, Washington D.C., where he also worked as an Aide to Congressman Richard Gephardt of Missouri. Completing his M.A. degree at the Hebrew University in 1988, he received High Honors for his graduate thesis.

Yuval Rotem is married to Miri with three children.

== Career ==
=== Early career ===
From 1978 through to 1985, Yuval Rotem served as a paramedical assistant and an ECG technician, in the emergency room in Ichilov Hospital, in Tel Aviv, Israel. From 1984 until 1985, he also served as a Parliamentary Assistant in the Israeli Parliament (Knesset) in Jerusalem. Prior to joining the Diplomatic Corps, he also served as a Parliamentary Assistant to Congressman Richard Gephardt (D-MO) in Capitol Hill, Washington, D.C.

=== Diplomatic career ===
Yuval Rotem joined the diplomatic corps in 1985. In his first two years, he was part of a cadet course in the training Division in the Ministry of Foreign Affairs. In his next two years, he served as a senior assistant to the Policy Advisor to the Foreign Minister. Rotem was first selected for an overseas posting in 1989, where he served as Chief Spokesman for Israel’s Permanent Mission to the United Nations and also for the Consulate General of Israel in New York. Upon his return in 1993, he became a Senior Assistant in the office of the Deputy Foreign Minister, and later, a Director of the office of the Senior Deputy Director. In 1995, Mr. Rotem was chosen by then Foreign Minister Ehud Barak to be his Senior Policy Advisor for the Peace Process.

Following Israel's national elections in 1996, Rotem was appointed to the position of Chief of Staff to the Foreign Minister, serving in that capacity under Foreign Minister David Levy and then under Prime Minister Benjamin Netanyahu. In 1999, Mr. Rotem was reappointed for a second term as Chief of Staff to the Foreign Minister. In 1999, Rotem was selected for his second overseas posting, this time as Consul General of Israel in Los Angeles, California. This posting included most of the Western region of the USA- Utah, Arizona, Colorado, Nevada, Hawaii, Wyoming and Southern California. Rotem had a strong connection with the Jewish Community in Los Angeles and frequently visited and spoke to the community. In 2003, Rotem received the rank of an Ambassador by Benjamin Netanyahu, then the Foreign Minister. This made Rotem the youngest career Diplomat with a rank of an Ambassador in the Foreign Ministry (Until 2014).

Upon his return from Los Angeles, Rotem took his time for further education. Rotem took on two courses: "Board of Governance for High-Ranking Officials, for Government Owned Companies" and "Concepts of Investments for Private & Public Clients". These were offered by HAMIL, a special school for Directors. It took place in Ramat Gan, Israel.

After three years, Rotem was assigned to be Ambassador of Israel to Australia and non-resident Ambassador to New Zealand, Papua New Guinea and Fiji.

After his arrival in Australia, Rotem further promoted the relationship between Israel, and its Oceanian allies. Rotem initiated a special motion in the Parliament of Australia celebrating Israel's 60th year of Independence in 2008. Rotem was part of Governor General Michael Jeffery's first state visit to Israel and participated in the opening of the Park of the Australian Soldier in Beersheba. The event was hosted by Israel President Shimon Peres.

In 2014, Rotem was appointed Senior Deputy Director General, heading the Israeli Foreign Ministry's Public Diplomacy Directorate. In this position, Rotem oversaw the activity of the Directorate's three main parts: The Media and Public Affairs Division, the Division for Cultural and Scientific Affairs and the Bureau for World Jewish Affairs and World Religions.

In October 2016, Yuval Rotem was appointed by Prime Minister Benjamin Netanyahu as the Israeli Foreign Ministry's acting Director General. Later in 2016 Rotem was permanently appointed Foreign Affairs Ministry's Director General.

In 2020 Rotem ended his term, being replaced by Alon Ushpiz.

== See also ==
- Ambassadors of Israel
- Israel-New Zealand relations
