= 2010 Gaza Freedom Flotilla =

Attempt to break the Israeli blockade of the Gaza Strip

Coordinates: 32.64113°N 33.56727°E

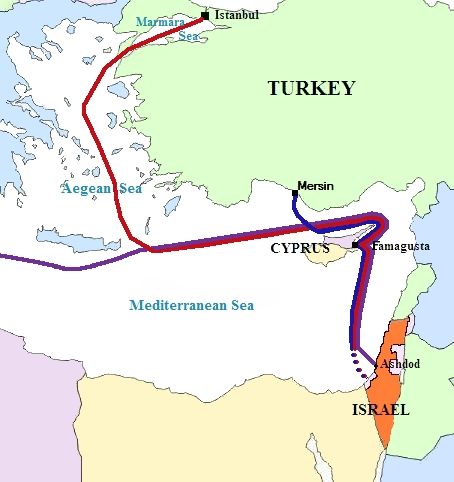
Gaza Flotilla Route

The 2010 Gaza Freedom Flotilla was a small fleet of ships by the Free Gaza Movement and the Turkish Foundation for Human Rights and Freedoms and Humanitarian Relief (İHH). The Flotilla mission to Gaza had the explicit goal of carrying humanitarian aid and construction materials with the intention of breaking the Israeli blockade of the Gaza Strip. In typical circumstances, aid is first brought to Israel to be inspected and then transferred to Gaza.

On 31 May 2010, Israeli forces boarded the ships in a raid from speedboats and helicopters. Following resistance on one of the boats, nine activists were killed by Israeli forces. Widespread international condemnation of and reaction to the raid followed, Israel–Turkey relations were strained, and Israel subsequently eased its blockade on the Gaza Strip.

== Overview ==
The flotilla was the Free Gaza Movement's ninth attempt to break the naval blockade imposed by Israel on the Gaza Strip. Israel proposed inspecting the cargo at the Port of Ashdod and then delivering non-blockaded goods through land crossings, but this proposal was turned down. Israeli forces then raided and seized the Gaza-bound ships in international waters of the Mediterranean Sea.

Five shipments had been allowed through prior to the 2008–09 Gaza War, but all shipments following the war were blocked by Israel. This flotilla was the largest to date. An Islamic aid group from Turkey, the İHH (İnsani Yardım Vakfı) (Foundation for Human Rights and Freedoms and Humanitarian Relief) sponsored a large passenger ship and two cargo ships.

While the UN's official report found Israel's blockade of Gaza to be legal, another set of UN experts, reporting to the Human Rights Council, came to the opposite conclusion finding that it violated international law.

== Organization ==
=== Ships ===
The ships of the Gaza flotilla raid comprised three passenger ships and three cargo ships:

- Challenger 1 (small yacht), US, Free Gaza Movement
- MS Eleftheri Mesogios (Free Mediterranean) or Sofia (cargo boat), Greece, Sweden Greek Ship to Gaza
- Sfendoni(small passenger boat), Greece Greek Ship to Gaza and European Campaign to End the Siege on Gaza
- MV Mavi Marmara (passenger ship), Comoros, İHH
- Gazze, Turkey, İHH
- Defne Y, Kiribati, İHH

Two other Free Gaza Movement ships, Challenger 2 (USA flagged) and MV Rachel Corrie (Cambodia flagged) were behind the rest of the flotilla due to mechanical problems. There have been claims this was due to Israeli sabotage. Challenger 2 aborted, but the Rachel Corrie continued its journey.

Flag	Name	Organisation	Port	Passengers	Crew	Cargo
(United States) USA	Challenger 1	Free Gaza Movement	Heraklion			
(United States) USA	Challenger 2	Free Gaza Movement	Heraklion			
Greece	MS Eleftheri Mesogeios	Greek Ship to Gaza	Piraeus			Wheelchairs, building materials, medicine
Greece	Sfendoni	Greek Ship to Gaza, European Campaign to End the Siege on Gaza	Piraeus			
Comoros	MV Mavi Marmara	IHH	Antalya	581		
Turkey	Gazze	IHH	Antalya	5	13	2,104 tons of cement, 600 tons of construction steel, and 50 tons of tiles
Kiribati	MV Defne Y	IHH	Antalya	27	23	150 tons of iron, 98 power units, 50 precast homes, 16 units of children's playground equipment, food, shoes, medicine, wheelchairs, clothing items, notebooks and textbooks
Cambodia	MV Rachel Corrie	Free Gaza Movement	Dundalk	11	8	550 tons of cement, 20 tons of paper, 100 tons of high-end medical equipment, wheelchairs, books, fabric, and thread

=== Cargo ===
Three of the flotilla ships carried only passengers and their personal belongings, while three other ships carried 10,000 tons of humanitarian aid, with an estimated value of $20 million. The cargo included food, wheelchairs, books, toys, electricity generators, operating theater equipment, medicines, medical equipment, textiles, footwear, cash, mobility scooters, sofas, and building materials, such as cement, which are prohibited under the Israeli blockade, although Israel offered to allow the cement to enter Gaza, if the flotilla were to dock in Ashdod.

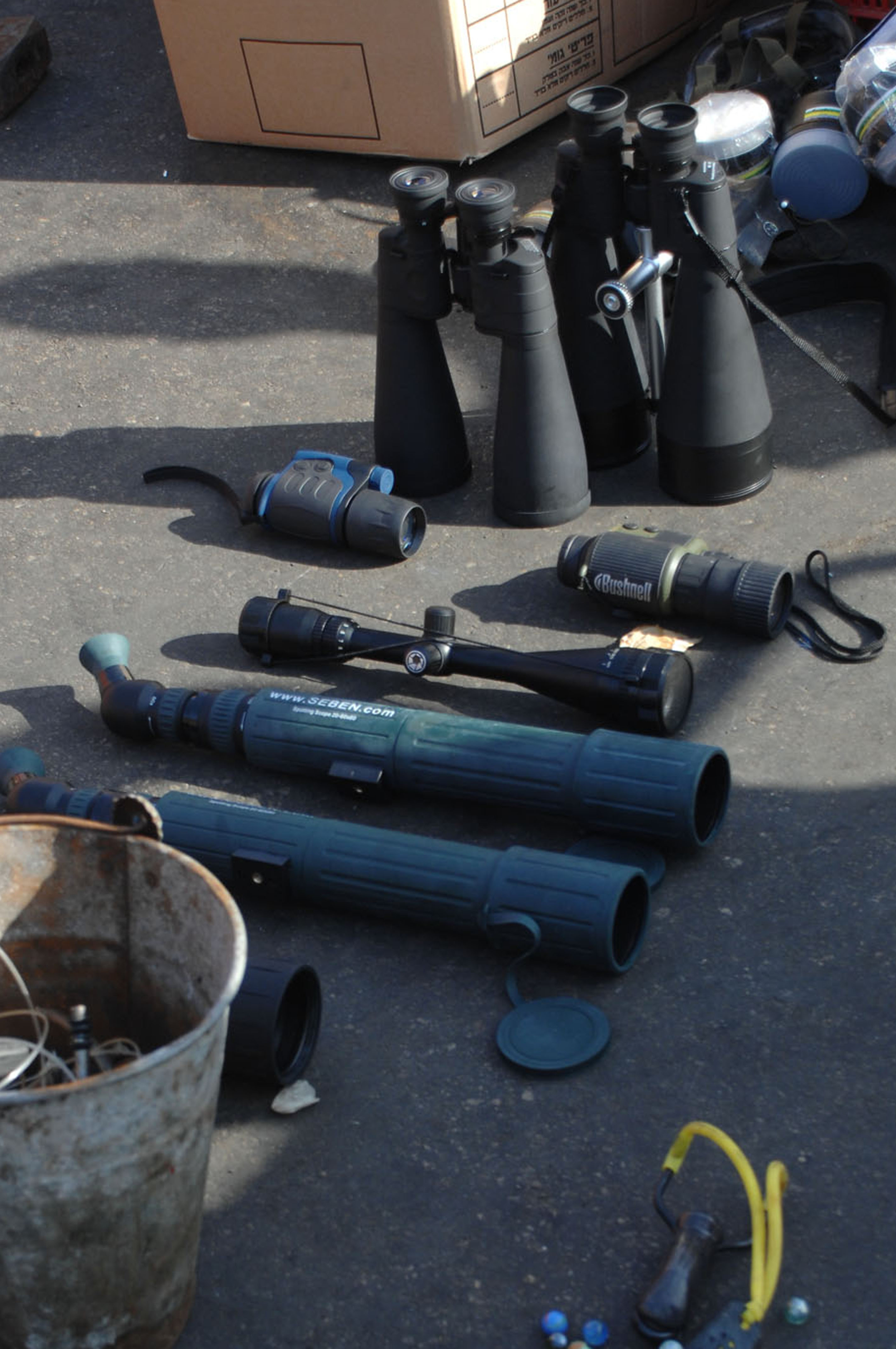
Night vision binoculars found on the deck of the Mavi Marmara, along with a scope to be mounted on a sniper rifle, according to IDF

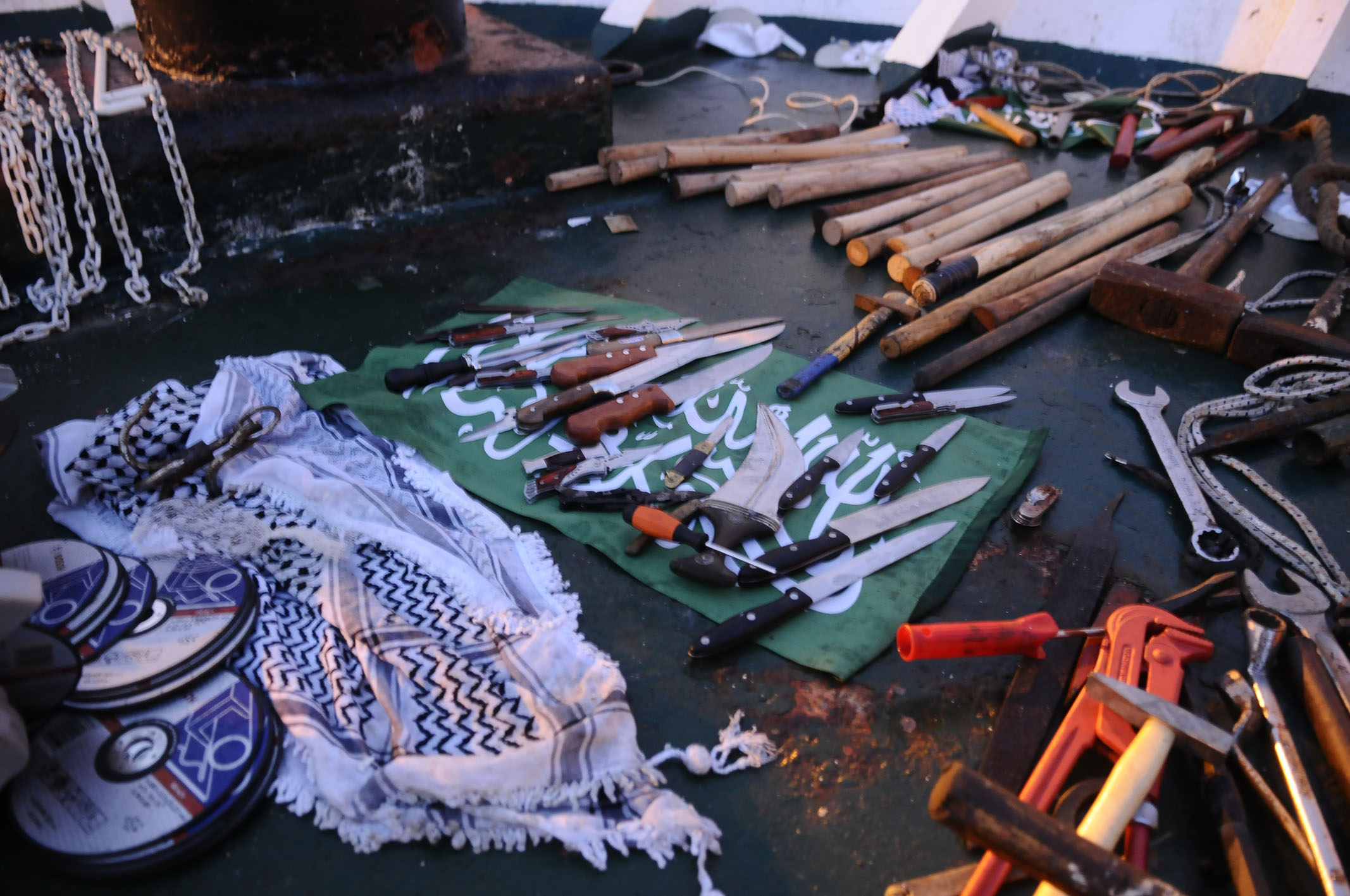
Knives, wrenches, and wooden clubs used to attack the soldiers during the flotilla raid, according to IDF

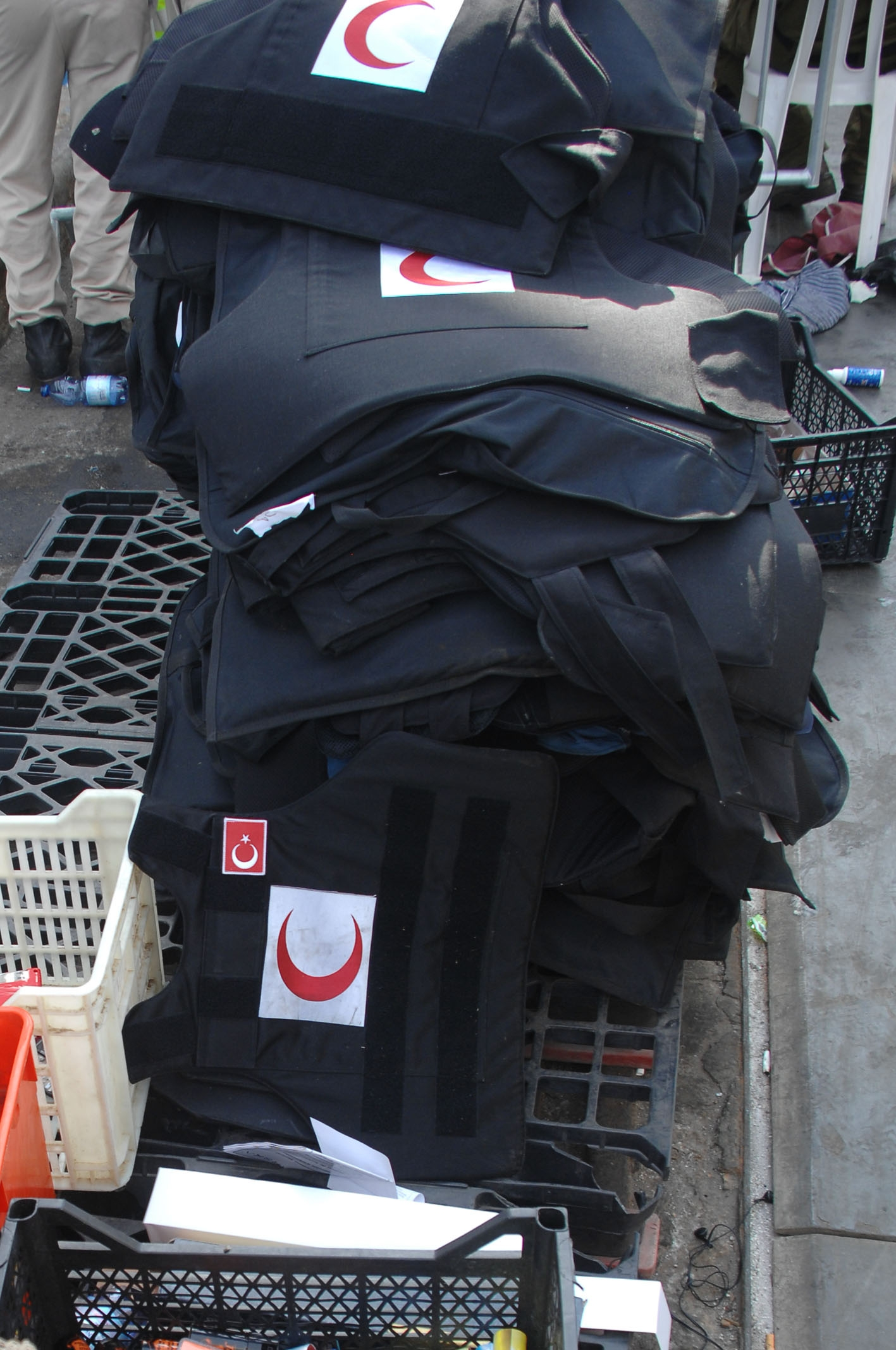
Bulletproof vests found on the deck of the Marmara, according to IDF

Israeli news reported the flotilla to be carrying ballistic vests, gas masks, night-vision goggles, clubs, and slingshots, although the UNHRC report does not mention these items and in the Turkish Report on the Israeli attack on the Humanitarian Aid Convoy to Gaza it states that all passengers and crew as well as the cargo were searched to international standards and no weapons were found, on the ships departing from Turkey.

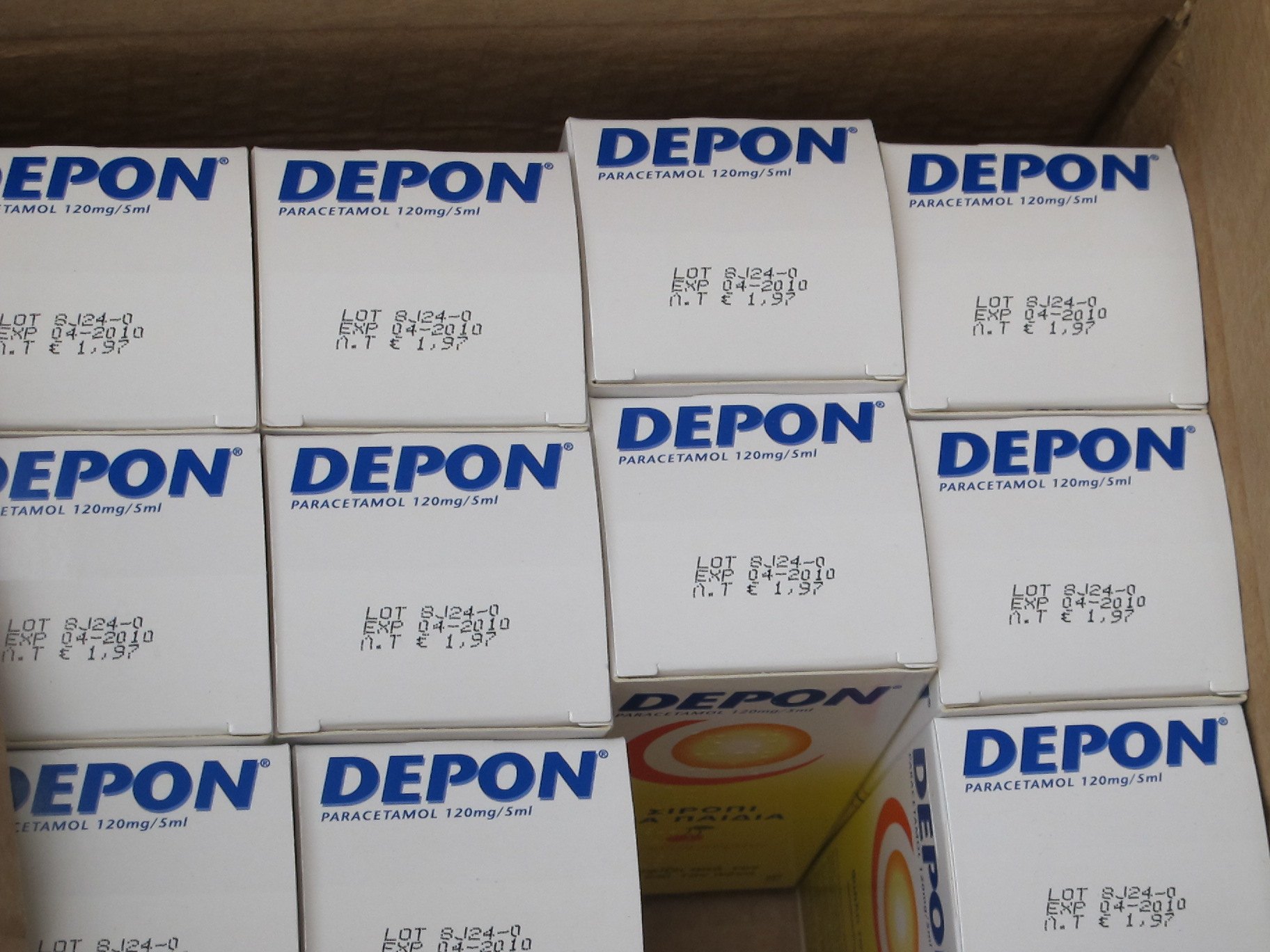
Seen here are many boxes of expired medicine which were to be delivered as aid by the Gaza flotilla.

Two-thirds of the medicines delivered by the flotilla expired between six and fifteen months prior to the raid, and were found to be useless. Operating theater equipment, which was supposed to be kept sterile, was carelessly wrapped. The expiring medications and sensitive equipment were kept in frozen storage in the Israeli Defense Ministry before delivery to Gaza.

=== Passengers ===
In previous voyages, Free Gaza vessels carried 140 passengers in total. In this flotilla, over 600 activists were on board the Mavi Marmara alone. There were 663 passengers from 37 nations on board the flotilla. Notable people aboard the flotilla included former UN Assistant Secretary-General Denis Halliday, former U.S. Ambassador to Mauritania Edward Peck, and USS Liberty survivor Joe Meadors. Israeli-Arab member of Knesset Haneen Zoubi, leader of the northern branch of the Islamic Movement in Israel Raed Salah, Swedish novelist Henning Mankell, convicted hijacker Erdinç Tekir, who participated in the Black Sea hijacking, and a number of parliamentarians from European and Arab national legislatures and the European Parliament.

==== Ties with groups marked as terror organizations ====
In June 2010 U.S. Assistant Secretary of State P. J. Crowley told reporters Wednesday: "'We know that IHH representatives have met with senior Hamas officials in Turkey, Syria and Gaza over the past three years,'" and "'That is obviously of great concern to us.'"

IHH has been investigated for its ties the Muslim Brotherhood, Hamas, and Al-Qaeda since at least 2008. Germany even banned İHH's German wing on July 12, 2010, stating that the group had direct links to Hamas, and provided it with material support.

The AP was quoted on MSNBC: "The Turkish Islamic charity behind a flotilla of aid ships that was raided by Israeli forces on its way to Gaza had ties to terrorism networks, including a 1999 Al-Qaeda plot to bomb Los Angeles International Airport, France's former top anti-terrorism judge said Wednesday."

In June 2012, it was reported that the IHH director Fehmi Bülent Yıldırım was reportedly being investigated by Turkish authorities for allegedly creating a financial partnership with Al-Qaeda.

== Motives ==
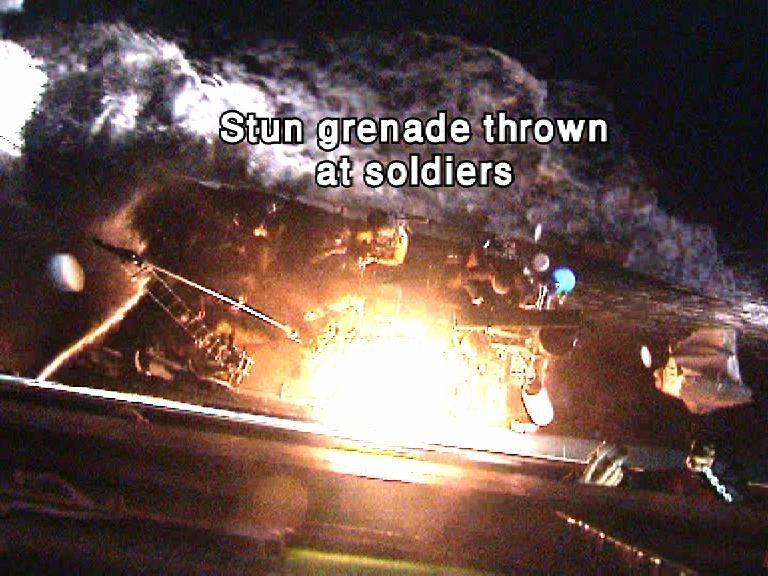
In a still taken from video footage filmed on the deck of the ship, activists on the Mavi Marmara throw a stun grenade at Israeli Navy commando soldiers.

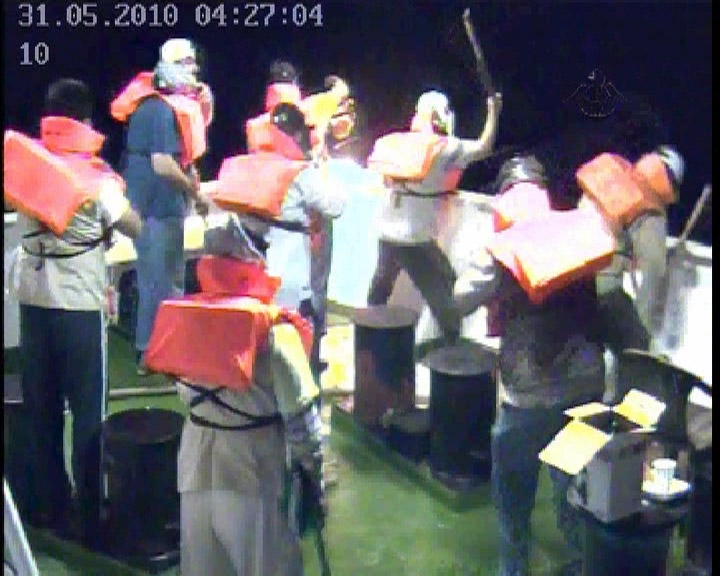
Footage taken from the Mavi Marmara security cameras shows the activists preparing to fight Israeli soldiers.

According to an early IDF press release, the ship carried 75 mercenaries with links to al-Qaeda and other terror organizations, who carried $10,000 apiece on their persons. The claim was never substantiated and was later withdrawn. Israel has said that the group boarded separately in a different city and went on deck under different procedures. The Turkish Customs officials and the İHH denied the allegations.

The impending arrival of the fleet was known to Israel government, military intelligence and press. Israel said that the flotilla was violating international law, but one of the flotilla's organizers, Greta Berlin, stated that "[w]e have the right to sail from international waters into the waters of Gaza". Israel informed the fleet that it would be redirected to the port of Ashdod and the cargo would be transferred to Gaza after undergoing a security inspection. Foreigners would be deported or, if they did not willingly agree to be deported, detained.

The flotilla organisers rejected Israel's demand, as it did not believe that Israel would transfer the cargo to Gaza, and said: "This mission is not about delivering humanitarian supplies, it's about breaking Israel's siege on 1.5 million Palestinians [...] We want to raise international awareness about the prison-like closure of Gaza and pressure the international community to review its sanctions policy and end its support for continued Israeli occupation."

The UNHRC fact-finding mission noted a "certain tension between the political objectives of the flotilla and its humanitarian objectives", which came to light "the moment the Government of Israel made offers to allow the humanitarian aid to be delivered via Israeli ports but under the supervision of a neutral organization". It also announced that Gaza did not have a deep sea port capable of receiving the sort of cargo ships participating in the flotilla. It concluded that "whilst the mission is satisfied that the flotilla constituted a serious attempt to bring essential humanitarian supplies into Gaza, it seems clear that the primary objective was political, as indeed demonstrated by the decision of those on board the Rachel Corrie to reject a Government of Ireland-sponsored proposal that the cargo in that ship be allowed through Ashdod intact".

Some supporters of the flotilla said that "a violent response from Israel will breathe new life into the Palestine solidarity movement, drawing attention to the blockade." Two of the activists (Ali Haydar Bengi and Ibrahim Bilgen) who died during the MV Mavi Marmara clash had previously said that they wished for martyrdom. On 29 May, Aljazeera broadcast footage of Mavi Marmara activists participating in a chant calling for battle against Jews.

Former U.S. Marine Kenneth O'Keefe, who was aboard the Mavi Marmara, stated that the activists knew from the outset that there would be no passive resistance. "I knew that if the Israelis boarded that ship, it would be a disaster [...] You have to be an idiot to board that ship and think it will be a ship of passive resistance", he told Haaretz newspaper.

== Initial leg ==
Six of the eight ships set out on 30 May 2010 from international waters off the coast of Cyprus; the remaining two were delayed by mechanical problems. "We do not even have a jackknife here, but we will not let Israeli soldiers on board this ship", İHH leader Fehmi Bülent Yıldırım told reporters via a live video stream before the convoy set sail.

The government of Cyprus refused to cooperate with the Free Gaza Movement or allow activists to sail from its harbors. The Cyprus Police stated that "anything related to the trip to Gaza is not permitted", and as a result remaining MPs and activists embarked instead from Famagusta in Northern Cyprus. Cypriot and Greek MPs and activists refused to embark via ports in Northern Cyprus. Having been delayed by two days, the flotilla aimed to reach Gaza on the afternoon of 31 May.

=== Pre-raid sabotage rumors ===
There are claims that the IDF or the Mossad may have sabotaged three of the ships before the raid. According to the National Post, Israeli deputy defense minister Matan Vilnai hinted that Israel had exhausted covert means of stalling the vessels. He said: "Everything was considered. I don't want to elaborate beyond that, because the fact is there were not up to 10, or however many ships were [originally] planned." A senior IDF officer hinted to the Knesset Foreign Affairs and Defense Committee that some of the vessels had been tampered with to halt them far from the Gaza or Israeli coast. According to UPI press coverage, the officer alluded to "grey operations" against the flotilla and said that no such action had been taken against the Mavi Marmara out of fear that the vessel might be stranded in the middle of the sea, endangering the people on board. Israel was accused of sabotaging activist ships in the past but no evidence has been found to back up these claims.

Three ships – the Rachel Corrie, the Challenger I and the Challenger II – suffered damage or malfunction. While the Challenger I was able to continue, the Challenger II had to turn back halfway through the journey and Rachel Corrie docked for repairs in Malta. Greta Berlin of the Free Gaza Movement said that electric wires may have been tampered with.

== 2010 raid and aftermath ==
Israeli forces raided the flotilla on the night of 30–31 May 2010 in international waters of the Mediterranean Sea, boarding the ships using speedboats and helicopters. Nine activists were killed. Dozens of activists and seven Israeli soldiers were injured.

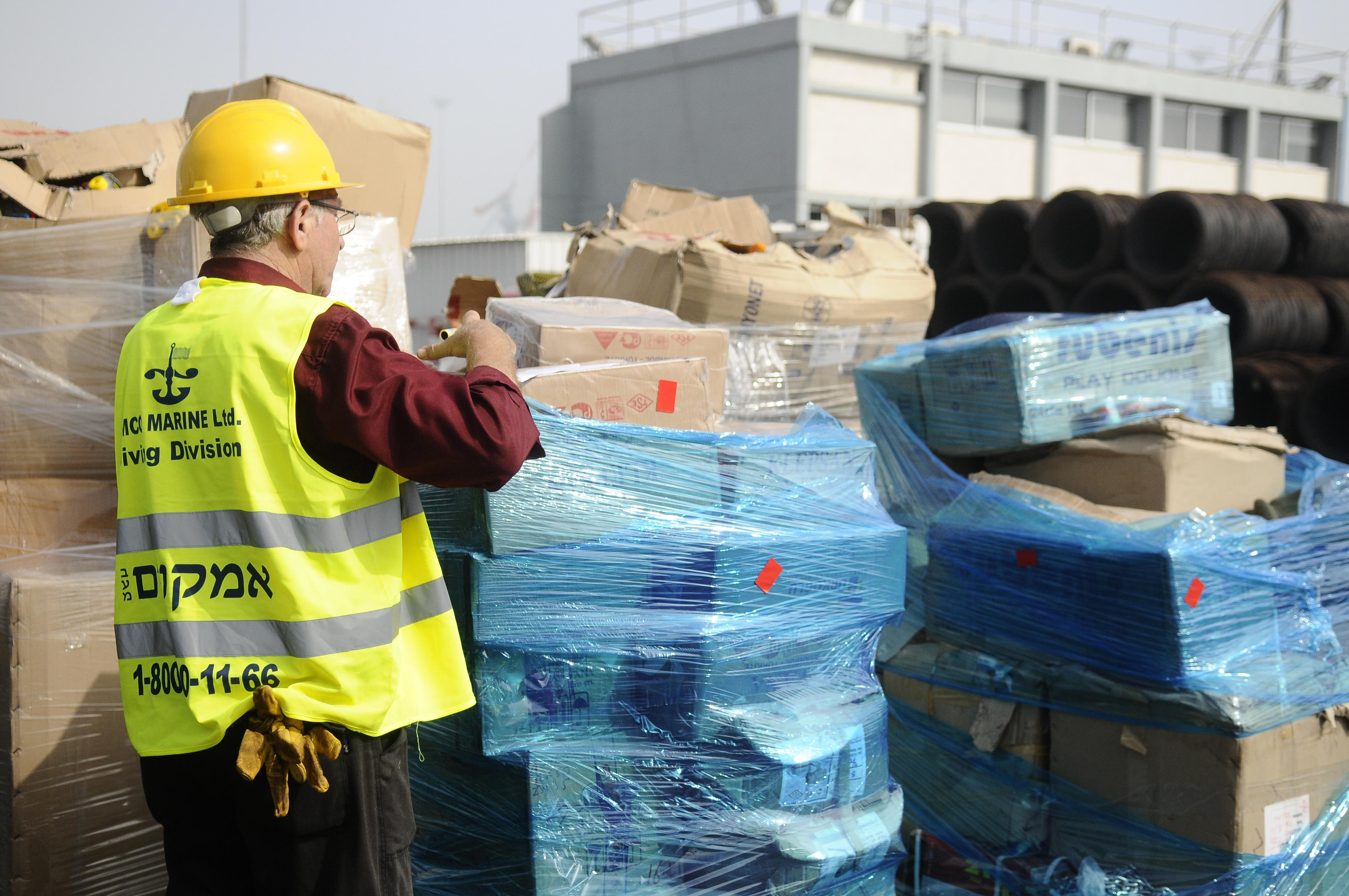
Children's toys from the Gaza flotilla are unloaded at the Ashdod Port, to be shipped to the Gaza Strip via the Kerem Shalom Crossing.

After the raid, the activists were detained in Israel pending release: all were deported by 6 June. The ships were towed to Israel and those claimed by their owners were returned. The aid was delivered to Gaza under United Nations supervision on 17 June.

Widespread international condemnation of and reaction to the raid followed. Various investigations were conducted, including by the United Nations, Israel and Turkey. Israel-Turkey relations were strained, and Israel subsequently eased its blockade on Gaza.

== Subsequent events ==
Following the incident, the Freedom Flotilla Coalition was established to coordinate further efforts against the Israeli blockade. Since then, attempts with the Freedom Flotilla II in 2011, Freedom Flotilla III in 2015, Women's Boat to Gaza in 2016, Just Future for Palestine Flotilla in 2018, and flotillas in June and July 2025, have all been intercepted, raided or attacked by Israeli forces. In August, the Freedom Flotilla Coalition joined the Global Sumud Flotilla, and began launching a series of flotilla convoys towards Gaza.

== Documentary ==
A 2017 Jordanian documentary, The Truth: Lost at Sea, recalls the story of the flotilla.

== See also ==
- Women's Boat to Gaza (2016)
- 2024 Gaza freedom flotilla

== Sources ==
- Carabott, Sarah (2 May 2025). "Gaza aid vessel 'attacked by drones' just outside Malta waters". Times of Malta.
- Goillandeau, Martin; Symons, Todd; Salman, Abeer; Magramo, Kathleen (2 May 2025). "Gaza Freedom Flotilla says ship has issued SOS, after alleged drone attack off the coast of Malta". CNN.
- Uras, Umut; Jamal, Urooba (2 May 2025). "'Strangulation': Israel kills 31 in Gaza as aid blockade starves children". Al Jazeera.
- "Report of the international fact-finding mission to investigate violations of international law, including international humanitarian and human rights law, resulting from the Israeli attacks on the flotilla of ships carrying humanitarian assistance" (PDF). UN Human Rights Council. 27 September 2010. p. 66.
- "Interim Report on the Israeli Attack on the Humanitarian Aid Convoy to Gaza on 31 May 2010" (PDF). Ankara: Turkish National Commission of Inquiry. September 2010. p. 74. Archived from the original (PDF) on 28 September 2011.
- "Report on the Israeli Attack on the Humanitarian Aid Convoy to Gaza on 31 May 2010" (PDF). Ankara: Turkish National Commission of Inquiry. February 2011. p. 117. Archived from the original (PDF) on 1 March 2011.
