= Kenneth O'Keefe =

American-Irish-Palestinian activist

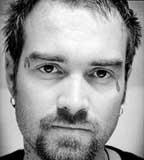
- O'Keefe in 2003
- Born: July 21, 1969 (age 57); Napa, California, United States

Kenneth Nichols O'Keefe (born July 21, 1969) is an American-Irish citizen and activist and former United States marine and Gulf War veteran. In 2001, he set fire to his United States passport. Subsequently, he led the human shield action to Iraq and was a passenger on the MV Mavi Marmara during the 2010 Gaza flotilla raid, where he disarmed two of the Israeli commandos who boarded the ship, initiating a confrontation in which ten Turkish activists were killed.

According to the Southern Poverty Law Center, starting in 2012, O'Keefe began giving speeches to white supremacist groups – often promoting antisemitic beliefs – and endorsed David Duke, leading what the SPLC terms the "larger Palestinian-rights and antiwar communities" to disavow him.

== Early life ==
O'Keefe was born in Napa, California, and raised in Southern California. He is of Irish descent, with family from County Kerry.

== Military background ==
O'Keefe served as a United States marine in the First Gulf War. According to his own website, he often "spoke out openly about abuse of power by my 'superiors'...the Marines supplied me with my first serious taste of injustice."

== Marine conservation ==
O'Keefe created a marine conservation social enterprise "to protect and defend the marine environment" in Hawaii in 1996. This enterprise conducted ghost net recoveries and rescues of endangered green sea turtle wrapped in monofilament fishing line. O'Keefe became a pioneer in sea turtle rescues in Hawaii and led a campaign to create a marine sanctuary (Pupukea MLCD) on the North Shore of Oahu.

In 1998 he joined an anti-whaling campaign in which he was bloodied when attempting to retrieve a boat belonging to the Sea Shepherd Conservation Society, of which he was a crew member. At this time he was being mentored by Paul Watson. Eventually he served as the regional director for the Sea Shepherd Conservation Society, in Hawaii.

== Human shield action to Iraq ==
In December 2002, O'Keefe started the human shield action to Iraq group. Intended to "make it politically impossible for them to bomb" Iraq by placing western civilians as "shields" at non-military locations, about 75 activists traveled over land from London to Baghdad in two double-decker buses. Critics of the human shields argued that their mission would only protect Saddam Hussein. O'Keefe argued the "people of Iraq" would suffer the most from a war and publicly acknowledged Hussein as a "violent dictator". At its height about 300 human shields were in Baghdad, but due to challenges internally, with the Iraqi dictatorship and O'Keefe's deportation from Iraq, the numbers dwindled.

== Citizenship ==
Since 2001, O'Keefe has unsuccessfully tried to formally renounce his U.S. citizenship while abroad. The first attempt took place in Vancouver, Canada, which was rejected as the State Department noted that he had returned to the United States shortly after. The second attempt while in The Hague, Netherlands was not answered for seven months, after which O'Keefe retrieved his U.S. passport from the embassy and lit the document on fire outside the building. A response from the State Department seventeen days later informed him that he remained an American citizen as he still had not received the right to reside in any other nation. Another attempt to renounce his citizenship took place while in Iraq, but O'Keefe was deported. He received Irish citizenship in 2003 through descent, but as of 2011, he still used his American passport to travel. O'Keefe considers himself a world citizen.

== Gaza Flotilla involvement ==
In June 2010, O'Keefe, who had since taken residence in London, England, was aboard the MV Mavi Marmara. During the Gaza flotilla raid, he was one of the passengers who disarmed IDF commandos boarding the ship. According to O'Keefe, he disarmed one from the 9mm pistol he was carrying, removing its bullets before hiding the pistol with the intention to keep it as evidence of the Israeli action against the ship. O'Keefe said he subsequently helped disarm another of the ship's IDF soldiers, by prising the commando's fingers from the rifle he was holding.

O'Keefe said of the experience that it was like "combat but without combat weapons". He said, "We had in our full possession, three completely disarmed and helpless commandos" who were "surrounded by at least 100 men ... [W]e could have done anything with them", adding that "woman provided basic first aid, and ultimately they were released, battered and bruised for sure, but alive. Able to live another day."

According to Greta Berlin, spokesperson for the Free Gaza Movement who was involved in the flotilla, O'Keefe "was responsible for some of the deaths on board the Mavi Marmara. Had he not disarmed an Israeli terrorist soldier, they would not have started to fire."

O'Keefe was among those arrested and detained in Israel, where he (according to himself and another activist) was beaten at Tel Aviv airport when he resisted deportation while still in Israeli custody. He claims a policeman hit him on the head with a truncheon and that he was choked until he almost blacked out. He said he spent two more days in a detention facility in the airport after the incident. O'Keefe said the Irish consul general tried to convince him to agree to leave and asked him to wash the blood off his face but he refused.

A video showing his bloodied face was released upon his arrival in Istanbul. On June 6, 2010, the Israel Defense Forces (IDF) charged that O'Keefe is an "anti-Israel extremist" and "operative of the Hamas Terror organization". According to the IDF he was entering the Gaza Strip in order to "form and train a commando unit for the Palestinian terror organization." He responded: "If they had a supposed terrorist in their possession, why the hell did they let me go?" He acknowledged having had meetings with Prime Minister Ismail Haniyeh and other senior Hamas officials.

== Road to Hope ==
In October 2010, O'Keefe joined the "Road to Hope", a humanitarian aid convoy to Gaza. Organizers were seeking to transport the convoy from the port of Derna, Libya to el-Arish, Egypt on board the private-charter roll-on/roll-off ferry M.V. Strofades IV, which left port unexpectedly without any of the aid after the ship's owners and captain got into an argument with the aid workers, although seven Libyan port officials and ten of the Road to Hope team were on board.

Organisers of the convoy claimed that despite paying a shipping agent for the charter of the ship, O'Keefe and the others were "kidnapped" from the port by the owner and the captain of the ship who "went nuts". The ship owners claimed that the activists had boarded the ship without any contract or charter. Due to a "tense atmosphere" aboard the ship, and (as he claimed) receiving no response from the Libyan authorities, the captain feared for the safety of the ship and decided to sail out of Libyan waters.

The ship eventually docked at Piraeus, Greece after being boarded by Greek commandos. All the activists were allowed to disembark after it was determined they had committed no crimes.

== The People's Voice ==
In September 2013 O'Keefe joined David Icke on the team of The People's Voice, an internet TV station. In particular, he is presenting The Middle East Show, reporting news and comments on the subjects related to Middle east politics. In 2013 he spoke on this program with Gilad Atzmon, an Israel-born saxophonist and activist who has often been described as antisemitic.

== David Duke ==
O'Keefe has formed a close association with the neo-Nazi David Duke. According to the Southern Poverty Law Center, "O'Keefe appeared on Duke's radio show in February 2013, where the pair discussed, according to Duke, "the International Conference on Hollywoodism to which he has been invited by Hamed Ghashghavi. It exposes the Zio control of Hollywood which not only promotes lies about the enemies of Jewish extremism, but literally poisons the hearts and minds of hundreds of millions of people in West and all over the world."

== Political views ==
O'Keefe appeared, alongside British politician Jenny Tonge at an Israeli Apartheid Week talk at Middlesex University on February 23, 2012, during which he stated, "Israel and Mossad were directly involved in 9/11" and that it "continues to foster false flag terrorism ... [Israel] has no place in this world. And it must in its current form, if you want me to use some inflammatory language, in its current form should be destroyed". A heated debate with supporters of Israel, who included Zionist Federation co-vice-chairman Jonathan Hoffman, followed O'Keefe's speech.

The police later reviewed remarks made by O'Keefe at the meeting after allegations were made by two pro-Israel activists who had been in the audience that they had incited racial hatred by comparing Jewish audience members to Nazis (O'Keefe had said: "The Jewish state is acting on behalf of the Jewish people. You [the Jewish people], like the Nazis, now have a special obligation. The decent Germans of World War Two, what did they do when the Nazis came to power and instituted their policies? Did they do enough to stop the Nazis? No, they didn't. What are the Jewish people doing right now? Are you doing enough to stop your racist, apartheid, genocidal state?"). After looking at submitted video and media material, the police came to the opinion that no criminal offences had been committed and no further action was taken.

Six student societies in the Palestine solidarity movement released a statement condemning O'Keefe's remarks as antisemitic, stating that such opinions had no place in their struggle "against all forms of racism". However, Middlesex University's Student Union awarded the Free Palestine Society for O'Keefe's speaking event with the 'best society event of the year'.

O'Keefe has also denied the Holocaust and has spoken against European laws against Holocaust denial. He has favorably compared Adolf Hitler to John F. Kennedy for "bypassing the Jewish banking debt."
