= Cevdet Kılıçlar =

Turkish journalist (1972–2010)

- Born: 5 May 1972; Kayseri, Turkey
- Died: 31 May 2010 (aged 38); International waters of the Mediterranean Sea
- Cause of death: Homicide by Israeli gunfire
- Education: Marmara University
- Occupation: Journalist
- Website: http://www.ihh.org.tr/ne-is-olsa-yaparim--diyerek-gitti/

Cevdet Kılıçlar (5 May 1972 – 31 May 2010) was a Turkish journalist and photographer from Kayseri. He had been a correspondent of the daily newspaper Anadolu'da Vakit. He was an aid worker and responsible for website of The Foundation for Human Rights and Freedoms and Humanitarian Relief (Turkish: İnsan Hak ve Hürriyetleri ve İnsani Yardım Vakfı). He was married to Derya Kılıçlar and had two children, Gülhan and Ali Erdem. He was killed in the 2010 Gaza flotilla raid.

== Life ==
Cevdet Kılıçlar was born in Kayseri in 1972, to mother Hatice and father Hüseyin. He completed primary and secondary education in Pınarbaşı, high school education in Adana and graduated from Marmara University's Faculty of Communications.

=== Umut Operation ===
Following graduation he worked as journalist for an Islamist daily newspaper Millî Gazete and then an Islamist weekly newspaper Selam. Selam newspaper, which was the publishing organisation of Tevhid Selam, was claimed to be supported by Iran and known its intimacy with the Welfare Party and Turkish Hizbullah. And after the beginning of "Umut Operation" related to the assassination of Uğur Mumcu, on 8 May 2000, as the press coordinator of Selam, he announced that there has been no relationship with the former administrators of Selam for three years after February 28 process. However, on 9 May 2000 Selam was raided by Turkish security forces and banned. Because of increasing pressure from the Turkish government he was forced to go to Germany.

=== To Palestine ===
After turning back from Germany to Istanbul he worked as correspondent and editor in chief for Islamist daily newspapers Vakit. He was a correspondent in the Palestinian territories and Egypt.

In March 2008 as the correspondent of Vakit newspaper, he was staying in Egypt to cross over into Palestine. When he took the picture of wall built by Egyptian government, near the Rafah Border Crossing, he was arrested and interrogated by Directorate of Military Intelligence Services and Reconnaissance of Egypt (Egyptian military intelligence service) for five hours.

== Death ==
Dead body of Cevdet Kılıçlar Source: Iara Lee, Caipirinha Foundation

He participated in Gaza Freedom Flotilla as the webmaster for IHH and foreign press coordinator. According to Turkish investigation, he was killed by a single distant shot to the middle of the forehead by Israel Defense Forces's commandos while taking photographs for the IHH on Mavi Marmara ship during 2010 Gaza flotilla raid.

The IHH president Fehmi Bülent Yıldırım said:

"Our Cevdet, he is a press member. He has become a martyr. All he was doing was taking pictures. They smashed his skull into pieces. We soon made out that these were real bullets they were firing. Rubber bullets also kill because you shoot at very close range, between one-and-a-half and two meters."

His funeral service was held at the Beyazit Mosque in Istanbul on 4 June 2010. And after Salat al-Janazah he was laid to rest in a coffin at Edirnekapı Martyr's Cemetery beside the grave of Metin Yüksel, who was one of leaders of Akıncılar.

Demetre Plionis, a Greek activist abroad Mavi Marmara said: “A half hour after the attack, despite electronic warfare, the “Mavi Marmara” ship continued to broadcast images on the internet thanks to a sophisticated system run by a Turkish volunteer. Then, I saw him dead after he was shot in the head.” referring to Cevdet Kılıçlar. “The broadcast was discontinued when the person who was running the network was killed,” he added.

The Director-General of UNESCO, Irina Bokova condemned the killing of Kılıçlar, stating, "I trust that an inquiry that meets international requirements will shed light on the events that led to Cevdet Kılıçlar's death and to the injuring of Indonesian cameraman Sura Fachrizaz."

Ankara Municipality renamed 1433. street at Ankara's Çukurambar neighbourhood to his memory as "Şehit Cevdet Kılıçlar Sokağı".
