= MV Rachel Corrie =

Cargo ship owned by the Free Gaza Movement

Coordinates: 32.825729°N 35.002985°E

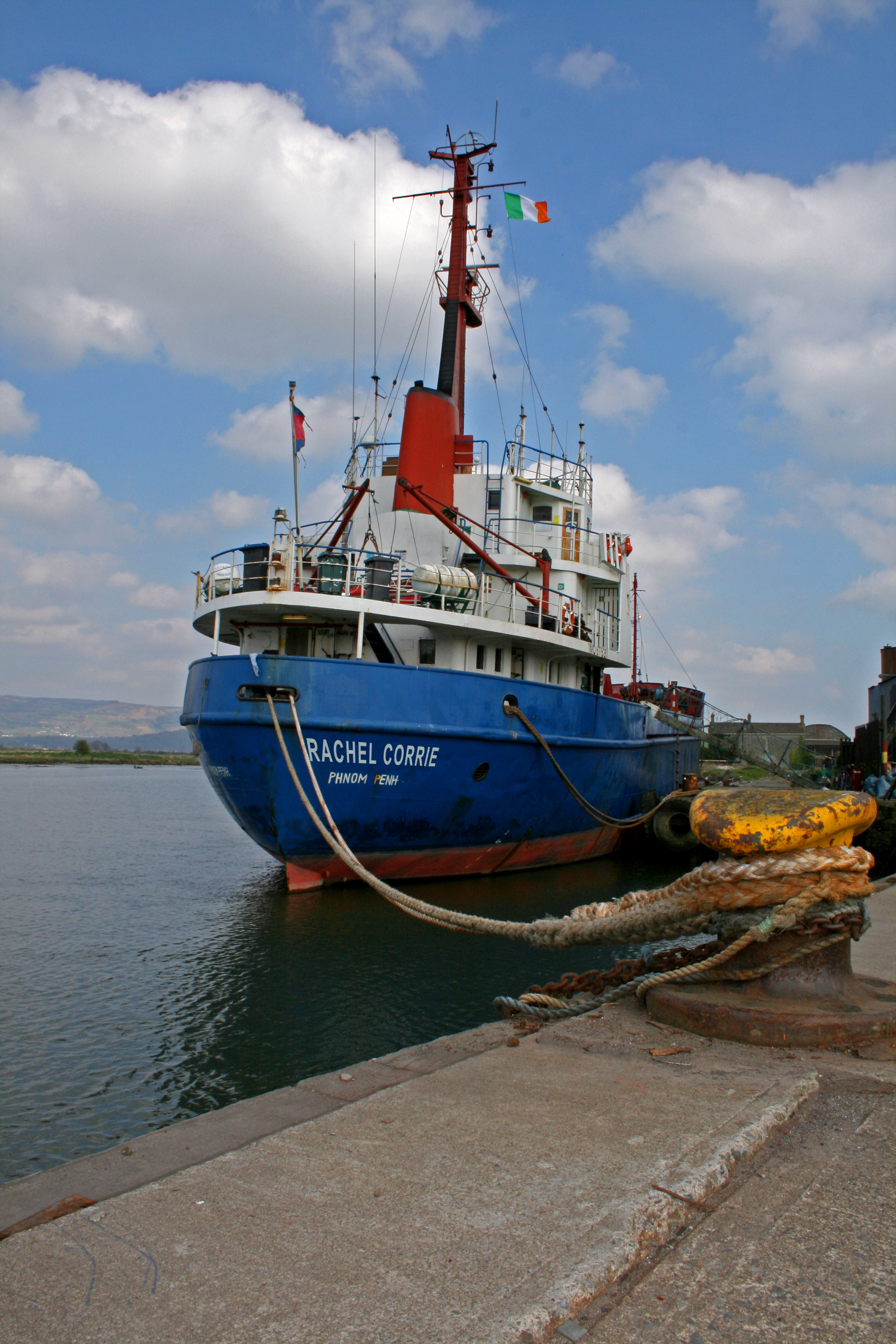
- MV Rachel Corrie

History
- Name: Carsten (1967–1993); Norasia Attika (1993–2000); Manya (2000–2003); Linda (2003–2010); Rachel Corrie (from 2010)
- Namesake: Rachel Corrie
- Owner: P Buck (1993–94); Ariadna Shipping Ltd (1994–2003); LSA Hansa Bunkering Ltd (2003–05); Lackner Ventures Ltd (2005–2010); Free Gaza Movement (from 2010)
- Operator: H Moller (1994–2004); Hanza Bunkering Ltd (2004–05); Forestry Shipping Ltd (2005); Eestinova (2005–2010); Free Gaza Movement (from 2010)
- Port of registry: (Antigua and Barbuda) Antigua (1993–2000); (Saint Vincent and the Grenadines) Kingstown (2000–2003); Latvia (2003–05); (Cambodia) Phnom Penh (since 2005)
- Builder: J J Sietas, Hamburg
- Yard number: 625
- Completed: May 1967
- Home port: Dundalk (since 2010)
- Identification: IMO number: 6715281; MMSI number: 515886000; Callsign: XUJW8

General characteristics
- Class & type: Coaster
- Tonnage: 499 GT; 479 NRT; 1,205 DWT
- Length: 68.43 m (224 ft 6 in)
- Beam: 10.52 m (34 ft 6 in)
- Depth: 6.25 m (20 ft 6 in)
- Installed power: Deutz diesel engine
- Propulsion: Screw propeller
- Speed: 12.5 knots (23.2 km/h)

MV Rachel Corrie is a 499 GT coaster owned and operated by the Free Gaza Movement. The ship is named in honour of Rachel Corrie, a deceased member of the International Solidarity Movement. Built by J.J. Sietas in Hamburg in 1967, she was originally named Carsten; she has also carried the names Norasia Attika, Manya and Linda.

In June 2010 the vessel was intercepted by Israeli Defence Forces while attempting to break the Israeli blockade of the Gaza Strip and to deliver humanitarian aid.

== Description ==
The ship was built as yard number 625 by J J Sietas, Germany. Completed in May 1967, she is 68.43 metres (224 ft 6 in) long, with a beam of 10.52 metres (34 ft 6 in) and a depth of 6.25 metres (20 ft 6 in). The ship is powered by a Deutz diesel engine which can propel her at 12.5 knots (23.2 km/h).

== History ==
=== 1967–1999 ===
Originally named Carsten, she was sold in 1993 to P Buck, Antigua and renamed Norasia Attika. She was sold on 8 December that year to Ariadna Shipping Ltd, St Vincent. On 1 February 1994 she was placed under the management of H Möller KG, Germany. She was renamed Manya on 24 November 2000. On 23 February 2004 she was sold to Hanza Bunkering Ltd. She was renamed Linda on 24 November 2003. On 30 August 2005 she was sold to Lackner Ventures Ltd. On 28 November 2005, she was placed under the management of Eestinova.

Linda was used by Guinness for exporting beer before being converted for use as a freighter. Her port of registry was Phnom Penh. The IMO Number 6715281 and MMSI Number 515886000 are allocated. Rachel Corrie uses the Callsign XUJW8.

=== 1999–2009 ===
By 2009, the ship had been bringing timber into Dundalk, Ireland from the Baltic for the previous 10 years. At the end of July that year, the Cambodian-registered vessel and its crew were abandoned by its owners, Forestry Shipping, of Riga, a company which has gone out of business. The crew were left with one day's food and were owed arrears of pay that totaled €42,000. With the assistance of the Irish union SIPTU, an affiliate of the International Transport Workers' Federation (ITF), they were repatriated to their home countries in November 2009.

=== 2009–2010 ===
After being seized by the High Court on behalf of the ITF, the ship was sold at auction in Dundalk for €70,000 to the Free Gaza Movement's Derek Graham on 30 March 2010. This enabled ITF Inspector Ken Fleming to pay the crew their arrears. It was outfitted at Brown's Quay in Dundalk, Ireland, for use in a voyage to Gaza. While there, a significant amount of navigational equipment worth between €15,000 and €20,000 was stolen from the vessel.

The ship was renamed in honor of Rachel Corrie, an American college student crushed to death by an Israeli army bulldozer while trying to prevent a house demolition in Gaza. The vessel was launched on 12 May 2010 from Dundalk with the full title MV Rachel Corrie. It was operated by the Free Gaza Movement, and partially funded by the Perdana Global Peace Organisation, a Malaysian NGO headed by former Malaysian prime minister Mahathir Mohamad.

=== 2010 Gaza journey ===
The Cambodian-flagged Irish MV Rachel Corrie had intended to sail with the six ships of the Gaza Freedom Flotilla, but was unable to join the other ships because of mechanical problems that forced it to undergo repairs in Malta, with unsubstantiated allegations of Israeli sabotage. The other six ships were confronted by a raid on 30 May 2010. In the violent clashes that followed, nine Turkish activists were killed and several dozen activists and ten IDF soldiers were injured.

==== Cargo ====
The ship was carrying humanitarian supplies, including 550 tons of cement intended to rebuild schools, homes and other building destroyed in Gaza, as well as 20 tons of paper, 100 tons of high-end medical equipment (including a CT scanner), fabric and thread, and educational supplies. Cement is one of the items which Israel has banned from entering Gaza as it worries that cement can be used to build bunkers, tunnels and rockets, but it has recently allowed some shipments for specific civilian building projects.

The aid-laden ship was checked for weapons in Ireland by customs officials and a senator from the Irish Green Party. No weapons were found. Irish Prime Minister (Taoiseach) Brian Cowen called on Israel to allow the passage of the Rachel Corrie. Ireland later reached an agreement with Israel and made a proposal to the ship that it divert to Ashdod, where Israel offered to transfer its cargo to the Gaza Strip, under the supervision of passengers and Irish diplomats. The passengers of the ship rejected the proposal. Israel reported its troops had taken control of the ship on 5 June, about 16 nautical miles (30 km) off the coast. An IDF spokeswoman said there "was full compliance from the crew and passengers on board".

Former United Nations Assistant Secretary-General, Denis Halliday, aboard the Rachel Corrie, expressed concern that some of these humanitarian goods would likely be seized if the MV Rachel Corrie accepted "an offer of an escort to another port". The cargo, although it all falls within the remit of humanitarian aid as defined by the United Nations, "would be confiscated by the Israelis, given that they do not define this as humanitarian goods – in breach of the UN definition of same".

Prior to the ship's last leg of its journey, Denis Halliday requested a final inspection of the cargo: "We are calling on the UN to inspect the cargo and escort us into Gaza, and to send a UN representative to sail on board before they enter the exclusion zone". Trade unions and government officials had previously inspected the cargo, "so we are 100 percent confident that there is nothing that is offensive or dangerous", he told Israel's Channel 2 Television.

==== Passengers and crew ====
The ship was captained by Eric Harcis, a British citizen from Orkney, Scotland.

There were eleven passengers on board the ship: Nobel Peace Prize laureate Maireád Corrigan-Maguire, former UN Assistant Secretary-General Denis Halliday, film maker Fiona Thompson, husband and wife Derek and Jenny Graham and six Malaysian citizens. Halliday said that the ship would stop only when Israelis forced the ship to do so. Passengers aboard the Rachel Corrie said that the purpose of their journey was to bring both humanitarian aid to the Gazan population and public attention to the Egypt-Israel blockade of the Gaza region; a blockade criticised by United Nations Relief and Works Agency for imposing "abject poverty" on 350,000 Gazans. Israel says the blockade of Gaza is needed to prevent the infiltration of weapons and militants into the coastal territory run by Hamas, which they and much of the international community have designated a terrorist organization. Israel has also called the campaign a "provocation intended to delegitimise Israel".

The Malaysian members were: Member of the Parliament of Malaysia, for the Parit constituency, Mohd Nizar Zakaria; Perdana Global Peace Organisation representatives, Shamsul Akmar, Matthias Chang and Ahmad Faizal Azumu; TV3 reporter Halim Mohamed and TV3 cameraman Jufri Junid.

==== Pre-raid sabotage rumors ====
The IDF or the Mossad may have sabotaged three of the ships before the raid. According to the National Post, Israeli deputy defense minister Matan Vilnai hinted that Israel had exhausted covert means of stalling the vessels. He said: "Everything was considered. I don't want to elaborate beyond that, because the fact is there were not up to 10, or however many ships were [originally] planned." A senior IDF officer hinted to the Knesset Foreign Affairs and Defense Committee that someone had tampered with some of the vessels to halt them far from the Gaza or Israeli coast. According to UPI press coverage, the officer alluded to "grey operations" against the flotilla and said that no such action had been taken against the Mavi Marmara out of fear that the vessel might be stranded in the middle of the sea, endangering the people on board. Israel was accused of sabotaging activist ships in the past but no evidence has been found to back up these claims.

Three ships – Rachel Corrie, Challenger I and Challenger II – were damaged or malfunctioned. While Challenger I continued, Challenger II turned back halfway through the journey and Rachel Corrie docked for repairs in Malta. Greta Berlin of the Free Gaza Movement said someone may have tampered with electric wires.

==== Voyage ====
The ship got underway on 31 May 2010, with her crew insisting that they would go to Gaza. The governments of Israel and Ireland reached an agreement to unload the ship's cargo in the southern Israeli port city of Ashdod, but the group sponsoring the ship rejected the proposal.

==== Interception and boarding ====
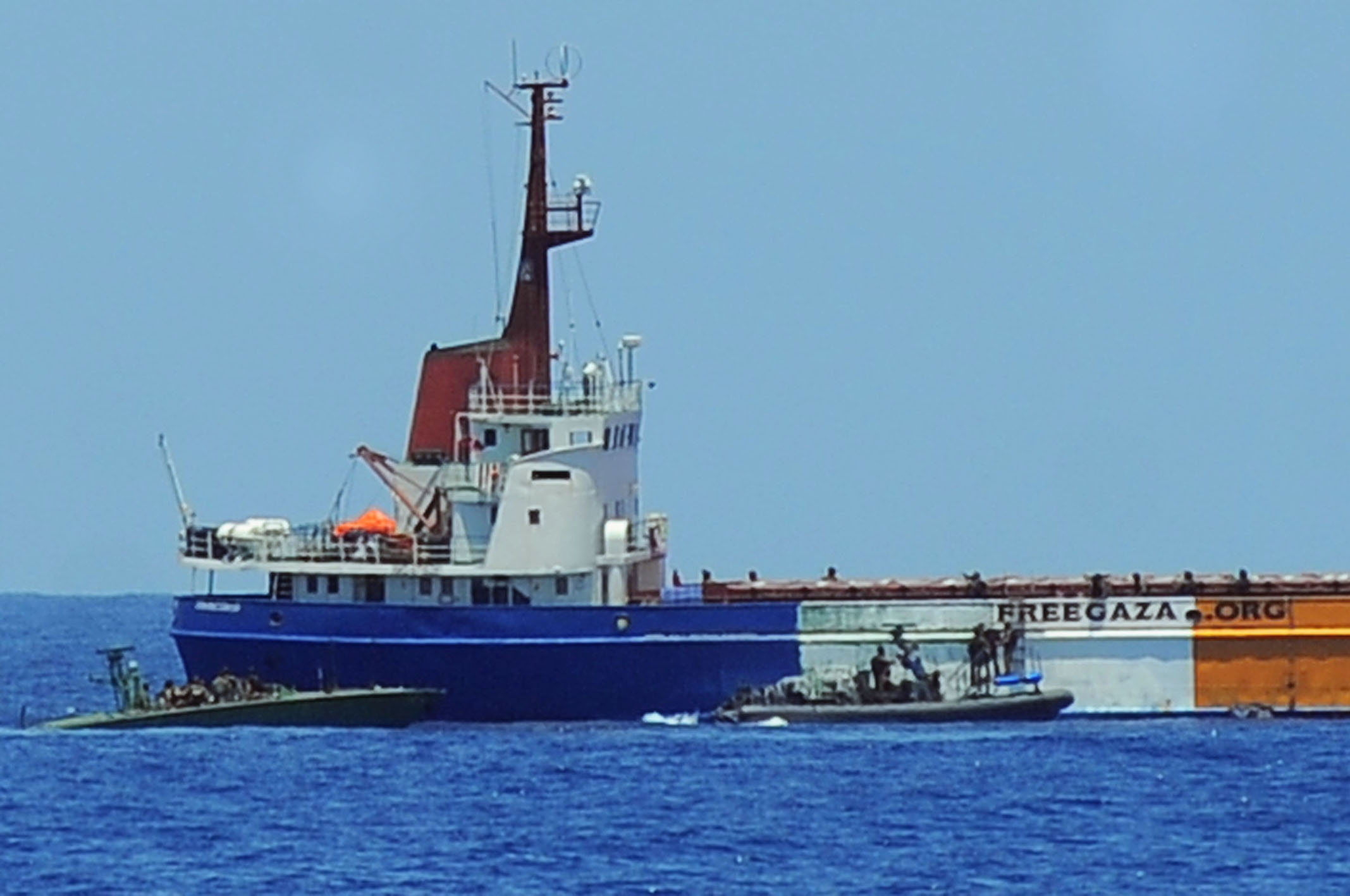
Israeli forces boarding Rachel Corrie

The Israeli military sent three warnings to Rachel Corrie asking it dock at Ashdod, change course, or face a naval takeover. The ship was shadowed by two Israeli Navy vessels, and its radar was jammed. After trailing the Rachel Corrie for several hours, Israeli commandos boarded the ship from speedboats at around noon on 5 June 2010, in international waters around 55 kilometres (30 nmi) off the Gaza Strip, Preliminary reports indicated that there was no resistance. The boarding involved about 20 combat soldiers. All the crew were arrested by these forces. as reported by veteran war correspondent Ron Ben-Yishai. The commandos forced the ship to sail to the Israeli port of Ashdod, where the crew were taken into custody by immigration authorities.

Greta Berlin, a spokeswoman for the Free Gaza group, said the takeover was "another outrage to add to the nine murdered" and denied an Israeli statement that troops had been invited aboard. The Gaza-bound vessel was addressed as Linda (an earlier official name) by naval officers during the air and sea operation. The protest activists and crew, having waived their right to appeal an order of deportation, left Israel on 6 June 2010, an immigration official said.

==== Governmental positions ====
- Israel – The government of Israel has been very opposed to the various blockade-running initiatives. One Israeli spokesman said: "These people are not supporting the Palestinians and they are not even supporting humanitarian causes. They are engaged in only one thing, and that is to create provocations and to collaborate with Hamas propaganda."
- Ireland – A proposal, put to them by the Irish Government, was declined "after careful consideration" whereby the ship would dock at the port of Ashdod and the vessel's cargo would be inspected under the supervision of both UN officials and the Irish Aid Division for the Department of Foreign Affairs. The proposal followed from the Irish Department of Foreign Affairs reaching an understanding with the Israeli Government on Friday, through various contacts. As the MV Rachel Corrie continued on its original course, Minister Martin stated that he "fully respects their right ... to continue their protest action by seeking sail to Gaza" and reiterated again, if the Israeli government were to intercept the ship, "that it demonstrates every restraint" given that those on board the MV Rachel Corrie had "made clear their peaceful intentions". Again the Irish Government restated its "call on Israel to lift its blockade of Gaza. Pending that, Israel should immediately facilitate the import into Gaza of all goods, other than weapons".
- United States – The US State Department and the Irish government were in contact on Thursday 3 June 2010; United States Deputy Secretary of State, Jack Lew, had an extensive conversation with the Irish foreign minister who, in turn, was in contact with the individuals on board the Rachel Corrie.
  Assistant Secretary of State for Public Affairs, Philip J. Crowley, hoped that the Rachel Corrie would "work with Israeli authorities to deliver these materials to Gaza." Crowley went on to say
  that's part of the conversation that we're having and how can we do this in a way where groups that have a vital interest in seeing the expansion of goods to the people of Gaza, have confidence that those materials will actually reach the people of Gaza and various groups that are working to help the people of Gaza ... And we hope in the meantime that everybody here will make responsible decisions and avoid unnecessary confrontations.
  Similar sentiments were expressed by the Irish Foreign Affairs Minister in a press release.

==== Aftermath ====
Northern Ireland's deputy First Minister Martin McGuinness criticised what he called "Israeli aggression" in the take over.

Dockworker unions in Sweden persuaded members not to service Israeli ships from 15 June – 22 June, South Africa has refused to handle Israeli ships, and the UK's Unite union has passed a motion to boycott Israeli companies.

== See also ==
- Ireland–Israel relations
