= Bülent Yıldırım =

Bülent Yıldırım may refer to:

- Bülent Yıldırım (referee) (born 1972), Turkish football referee
- Fehmi Bülent Yıldırım (born 1966), Turkish lawyer
