= Internationale Humanitäre Hilfsorganisation e.V. =

German voluntary association

The Turkish-German association Internationale Humanitäre Hilfsorganisation e.V. (IHH e.V.) ("International Humanitarian Aid Organization – registered association") or IHH Germany, was a registered association based in Frankfurt with branches in Belgium, Denmark, the Netherlands, and Austria.

In July 2010, Germany outlawed the Internationale Humanitaere Hilfsorganisation (IHH), saying it has used donations to support projects in Gaza that are related to Hamas, which is considered by the European Union to be a terrorist organization, while presenting their activities to donors as humanitarian help. German Interior Minister Thomas de Maiziere said, "Donations to so-called social welfare groups belonging to Hamas, such as the millions given by IHH, actually support the terror organization Hamas as a whole." IHH e.V. was believed by the German Authorities to have collected money in mosques and to have sent $8.3 million to organizations related to Hamas.

The main figures in IHH Germany are also active in the Islamic group Millî Görüş, which has been under observation by German authorities.

According to the website of IHH Germany (now inaccessible), the association was founded in 1998, with the name Initiative Humanitäre Hilfe (Initiative Humanitarian Aid).

Turkish Foreign Minister Ahmet Davutoğlu criticized Germany for banning IHH Germany while remaining silent on the PKK in Germany, which has been designated as a terrorist organization according to German court rulings.

The Dutch government froze the bank assets of the Dutch branch (Internationale Humanitaire Hulporganisatie) in April 2011, stating that research by the Dutch intelligence service had shown it had transferred millions of euros to IHH Germany.

== Legal challenges ==
In April 2012, the Federal Administrative Court dismissed IHH e.V.'s challenge to the ban, holding that the Federal Ministry of the Interior had correctly found that the association acted against the concept of international understanding. The European Court of Human Rights later considered the association's Article 11 freedom-of-association complaint and, in a judgment of 10 October 2023, found no violation.

== Relationship with IHH Turkey ==
According to German authorities, IHH Germany and IHH Turkey share the same roots, originally being one organization founded in 1992 in Freiburg, Germany, that split in 1997; the Turkish IHH has said in response that it is not "in any way related" to IHH Germany, and stated that the German IHH was founded by "a completely different group of people" having no association with the Turkish IHH.

== See also ==
- Hamas
- List of charities accused of ties to terrorism
