= Abdul Razak al-Hashimi =

Iraqi politician

Dr. Abdul Razak al-Hashimi (Arabic: عبد الرزاق الهاشمي) is a former Iraqi diplomat, Minister of Higher Education, and senior advisor to Saddam Hussein.

Hashimi graduated from Boston University in 1969. In 1974, he was part of a delegation to France to negotiate the purchase of nuclear reactors.

He led Iraq's Organisation of Friendship, Peace, and Solidarity to counter the 2003 Invasion of Iraq with human shield volunteers.
