= Human shield action to Iraq =

Anti-invasion activist movement

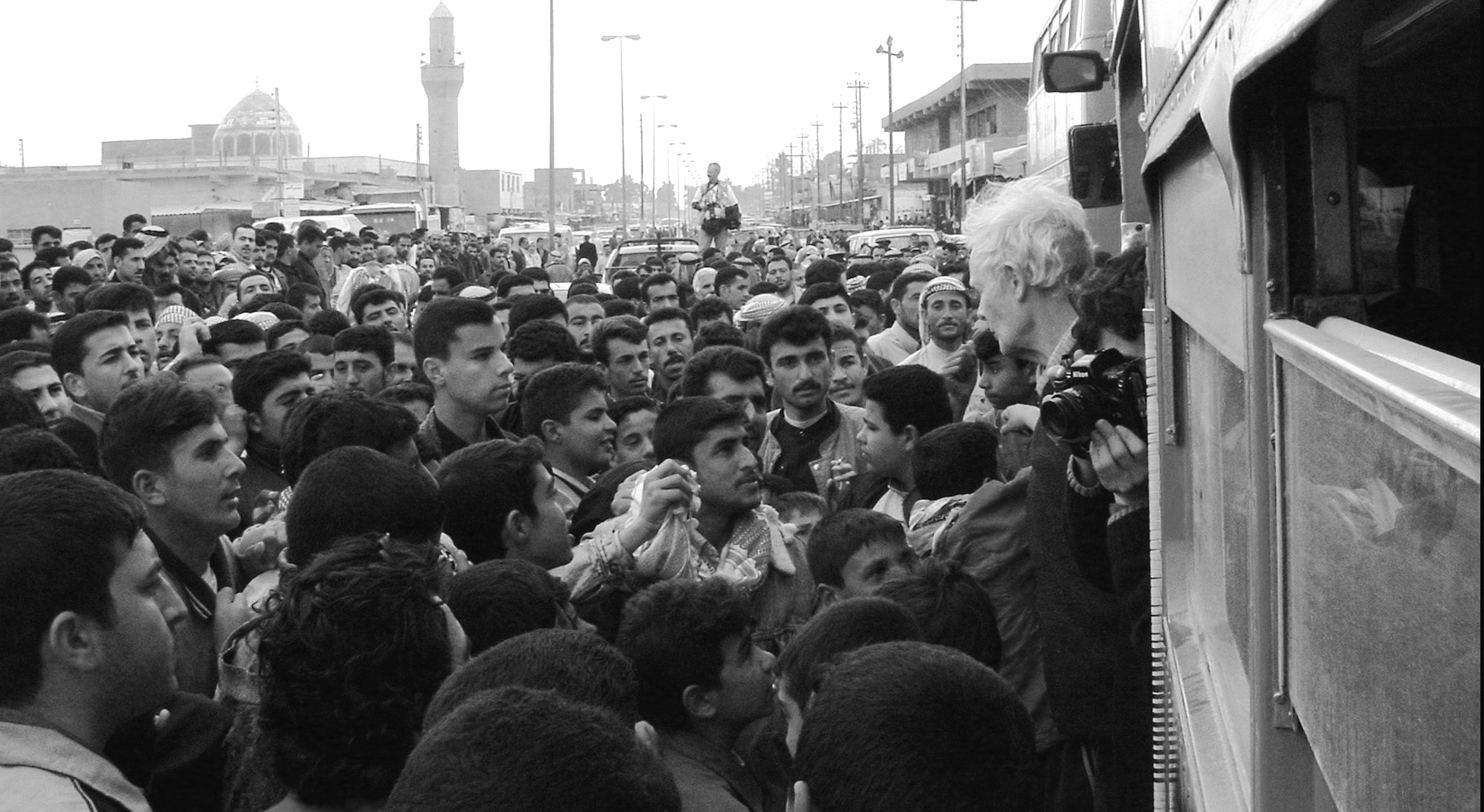
Human shields greeted as they cross the border into Iraq, 15 February 2003

The Human Shield Action to Iraq was a group of people who traveled to Iraq to act as human shields with the aim of preventing the U.S.-led coalition forces from bombing certain locations during the 2003 invasion of Iraq.

== Chronology ==
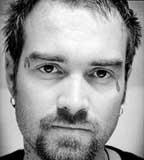
Ken O'Keefe, founder of the action

In December 2002, Kenneth O'Keefe, an ex-U.S. marine and Persian Gulf War veteran who had attempted multiple times to renounce his U.S. citizenship, posted a call to action for large numbers of western citizens to migrate to Iraq and deploy themselves as "Human Shields". The action was ultimately named the TJP (Truth Justice Peace) Human Shield Action to Iraq. O'Keefe believed that protests and petitions had no chance of preventing the invasion and that a large presence of western citizens, strategically placed in Iraq at potential targets, was the only viable deterrent to war. He argued that thousands of human shields deployed to these sites would make the invasion politically untenable. O'Keefe publicly acknowledged Saddam Hussein as a "violent dictator" and "mass-murderer" before he arrived in Iraq; it has been speculated he did this in an attempt to neutralize the perception that the human shields were simply pawns of Saddam. Consequently, he received no favor from Saddam, his influence within the action declined rapidly as he traveled to Iraq, and eventually he was deported days before the invasion. Before his deportation he repeatedly alleged Western support for Hussein during some of his most notorious atrocities; ultimately he argued that it was the people of Iraq who would suffer most from war.

In January 2003 a group of anti-war activists joined O'Keefe in London and set out to carry out the plan. On 25 January 2003 a group of 50 volunteers left London and headed for Baghdad with the intention of acting as human shields. The convoy travelled through Europe and Turkey by bus and picked up more volunteers along the way, totalling roughly 75 people. It has been estimated that 200 to 500 people eventually made their way into Iraq before the invasion in March.

Upon reaching Baghdad, a strategy was formed on the assumption that there would not be enough human shields to avert an invasion. This was to involve the voluntary deployment of activists to strategic locations throughout Baghdad, and possibly Basra, in an effort to avert the bombing of those locations. There was much internal debate about which locations were to be chosen.

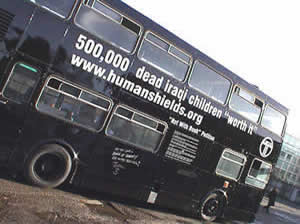
Human shields black bus, 25 January 2003

Eventually volunteers deployed to Al Daura Electrical Plant, Baghdad South Electrical Plant, 7 April Water Treatment Plant, Al Daura Water Treatment Plant, Tejio Food Silo, Al Daura Oil Refinery and Al Mamun Telecommunications Facility.

The need to work closely with the Iraqi government was not something many of shield volunteers felt comfortable with. Some felt that the list delivered by the officials compromised their autonomy. Others felt that they would rather be deployed in schools, hospitals, and orphanages. These shield volunteers left Iraq. The rest took up residence at the sites, a list of which was sent to the Joint Chiefs of Staff together with a request that they recognize the activists' assertion that targeting these sites would be in violation of Article 54 Protocol Additional to the Geneva Convention. There was no response to the letters.

At its peak the total of shield volunteers in Baghdad numbered about 500, but the realization that the thousands needed to have a chance of stopping attacks on Baghdad had not materialized, combined with the failure of the United Nations to forestall war, meant that bombing was imminent. Many of the shields chose to stay; many others chose to leave. Still others, like O’Keefe, were ordered out by the Iraqi government. Some, including a 21-year-old, Tom Hurndall, a young photo-journalist, who had travelled to observe and work with the human shields, left Baghdad over concerns as to the activities being undertaken. He subsequently went to the Palestinian territories where he was shot dead by an Israeli soldier while working with and photographing the International Solidarity Movement.

None of the 80 shields who stayed in Baghdad throughout the war were killed or injured. None of the sites where they were residing were destroyed.

During their deployments a small group of volunteers led by Gordon Sloan of New Zealand took on the job of vetting sites to ensure they were not in close proximity to military facilities. This was to be the cause of some conflict with their Iraqi host, Dr. Abdul Razak al-Hashimi, Saddam Hussein's spokesman during the first Gulf War, and head of the Friendship, Peace and Solidarity organisation which was hosting the activists under the authority of the Ba'athist Iraqi government.

With an invasion imminent Hashimi became frustrated by Sloan's explorations, called a meeting, and asked the activists to deploy to sites or leave Iraq. Hashimi's meeting is said by some of the leading volunteers to have been a costly political mistake. It was the trigger of much anxiety among the volunteers and negative reporting in the media, including mis-reports that activists were being forced to deploy to military sites. It was also at this point that some of the British volunteers were to return to London along with the two double-decker red buses and their owner, which were originally meant to have left soon after arrival.

The paranoia that rose up around Hashimi's announcement and the reports that the buses were leaving Iraq slowed the influx of activists into Iraq, and caused some of those already there to leave Iraq, believing they had lost credibility through Hashimi's actions. The Iraqi authorities, on the other hand, saw Kenneth O'Keefe, Sloan, and other organisers as constantly challenging Hashimi's authority and being deliberately disruptive, and that some would-be shields were taking too long to deploy to sites. Five of the 'trouble makers' were then asked to leave the country.

Many activists stayed on, however, and remained at the chosen sites. It is claimed that eighty human shields stayed in the Baghdad area throughout the bombing campaign.

== Analysis and effects of the human shields ==
Human shields meeting in Iraq, 1 March 2003, at the Palestine Hotel in Baghdad, Iraq

On 26 February 2003, Senior CNN Pentagon Correspondent, Jamie McIntyre, commented that the "Pentagon says they will try to work around human shields" as long as they were not deployed to military sites. Of all the shielded sites, only the Al Mamun Telecommunications Facility – arguably a legitimate target under the Geneva Conventions – was eventually bombed, one day after the human shields pulled out of it.

For violating a U.S. prewar travel ban, human shields from the U.S. faced fines and/or imprisonment. On the day after the departure of the human shield convoy, White House Chief of Staff, Andrew Card, released a statement condemning the action and Fox News reported that U.S. leaders were considering prosecuting U.S. human shields for war crimes.

=== Criticisms ===
The Human Shield Movement was criticized for what many saw as being an overt act of aiding Saddam Hussein's governance. Charges of the shields being "dupes" and "useful idiots" for Saddam were widespread in the U.S. The participants argued that while various governments around the globe carry out acts of aggression, the human shield action was aimed at averting one.

Human Rights Watch stated that "civilians acting as human shields, whether voluntary or not, contribute indirectly to the war capability of a state. Their actions do not pose a direct risk to opposing forces. Because they are not directly engaged in hostilities against an adversary, they retain their civilian immunity from attack." Human Rights Watch also noted that the use by a state of human shields, voluntary or not, is a violation of international law, citing Protocol I of the First Geneva Convention.

Jonah Goldberg claimed after a debate with O'Keefe, that "O'Keefe and his friends are objectively in favor of Saddam Hussein and his murderous regime because they believe he is uniquely worth defending with their bodies. They may be brave, I guess, but they're still idiots, and I'm sure Saddam is grateful for them".

Maria Ermanno, chairwoman of the Swedish Peace and Arbitration Society, cited reports that Iraqi officials were arranging transportation, accommodations and news conferences for the human shields and that they were being used for propaganda purposes by Saddam Hussein: "To go down to Iraq and live and act there on the regime's expense, then you're supporting a terrible dictator. I think that method is entirely wrong," Ermanno told Swedish Radio.

The Iraqi government was also criticized for encouraging and facilitating the human shield actions, since this was a violation of international law and Protocol I, article 20 of the Geneva Convention.

A decade after the start of the Iraq War a number of human shields were interviewed for an article on the movement. None of them regretted having taken part in the action. "It was the right thing to do," claimed Eric Levy who was at Dura oil refinery in southern Baghdad for the duration of the air campaign: "The war was illegal and immoral. We may have failed to stop the invasion, but by putting ourselves in harm's way, we sent a clear message to the world. A message that will hopefully continue to reverberate."

== See also ==
- Human shield
- Non-violent resistance
- Popular opposition to war on Iraq
- Protests against the 2003 Iraq war
- 2003 invasion of Iraq
- Anti-war
- Peace movement
