= Edward Peck (American diplomat) =

American diplomat

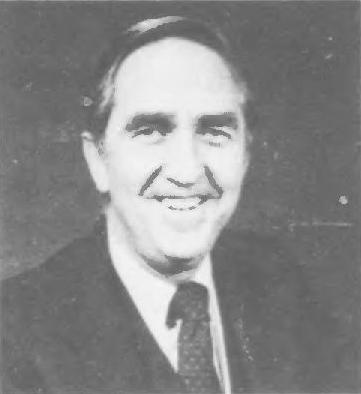
- Peck c. 1982

Personal details
- Born: Edward Lionel Peck; March 6, 1929 (age 97) Los Angeles, California, U.S.
- Spouse: Ann Peck
- Children: 4
- Education: University of California, Los Angeles (B.S.); George Washington University School of Business (MBA)

Military service
- Allegiance: United States
- Rank: First lieutenant
- Wars: World War II; Korean War

Edward Lionel Peck (born March 6, 1929) is a retired career United States diplomat who served 32 years in the U.S. Foreign Service (from 1956 until 1989).

== Early life and career ==
Born to immigrant parents, Ambassador Edward Peck served as Special Assistant to the Under Secretary of State for Political Affairs in the Nixon Administration, January 1971. He was Chief of Mission in Mauritania and in Iraq, and later held senior posts in Washington and abroad. He also served as a Foreign Service Officer in Morocco, Algeria, Tunisia and Egypt. At the State Department he served as Deputy Director of Covert Intelligence Programs, Director of the Office of Egyptian Affairs. He served as Deputy Director of the White House Task Force on Terrorism in the Reagan Administration.

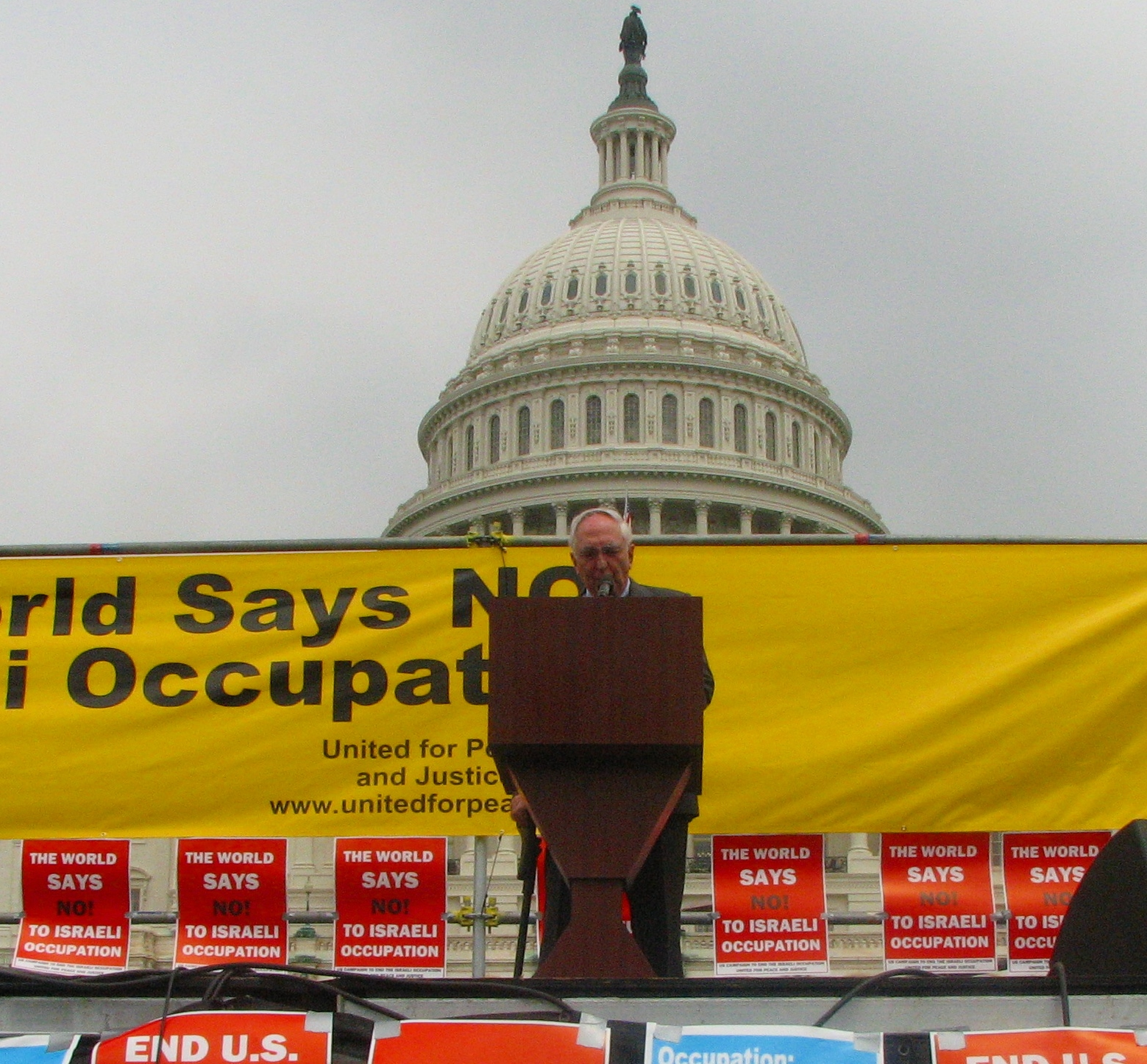
Peck speaking at the "End the Israeli Occupation of Palestine" rally in the grounds of the US Capitol, 2007

== Personal life ==
Edward Peck resides in Chevy Chase, Maryland, with his wife Ann. He is the father of four grown children. Peck has a B.S. from the University of California, Los Angeles (1956) and Master of Business Administration from the George Washington University School of Business (1973).
