= MV Mavi Marmara =

Turkish passenger ship

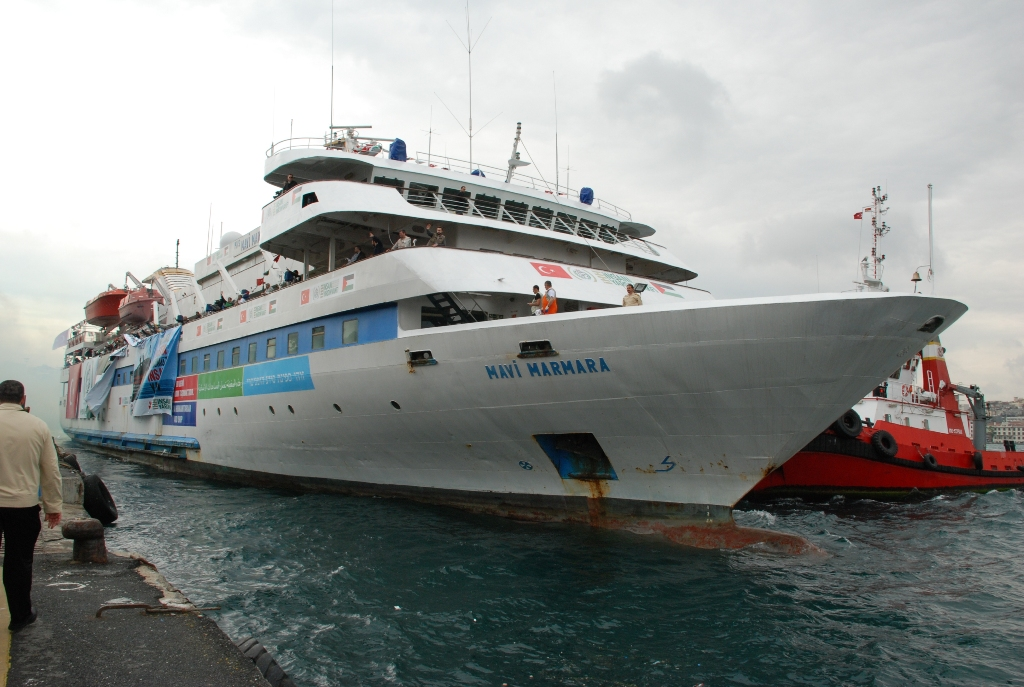
- MV Mavi Marmara leaving Antalya for Gaza on May 22, 2010.

History

Comoros
- Name: MV Mavi Marmara
- Owner: IHH (İnsani Yardım Vakfı)
- Operator: IHH (İnsani Yardım Vakfı)
- Builder: Türkiye Gemi Sanayii A.Ş.
- Yard number: 302
- Completed: November 9, 1994
- Home port: Moroni, Comoros (2010). Previously Istanbul, Turkey
- Identification: IMO number: 9005869

General characteristics
- Type: Passenger ship
- Tonnage: 4,142 GT
- Length: 93 m (305 ft)
- Beam: 20 m (66 ft)
- Draft: 4 m (13 ft)
- Installed power: 4,400 kW
- Propulsion: 2
- Speed: max. 9.9 knots (18.3 km/h; 11.4 mph)- avg. 7.2 knots (13.3 km/h; 8.3 mph)
- Capacity: 1,080 passengers

MV Mavi Marmara is a Comoros-flagged passenger ship, which was formerly owned and operated by İDO Istanbul Fast Ferries Co. Inc. on the line Sarayburnu, Istanbul-Marmara Island-Avşa Island in the Sea of Marmara. Built at the Golden Gate Shipyard by Turkish Shipbuilding Co. in 1994, the ship has a capacity of 1,080 passengers. It is best known for its participation in the 2010 Gaza Freedom Flotilla and the deadly confrontation that took place on it during the Gaza flotilla raid.

== History ==
=== Gaza Freedom Flotilla ===
The MV Mavi Marmara was purchased in 2010 by the IHH, a Turkish NGO active as a charity organization in more than 115 countries. The group has represented its Turkish language name in English in various ways, "IHH Humanitarian Relief Foundation" among them. It has held Special Consultative Status with the United Nations Economic and Social Council since 2004, and is endorsed by international figures that include South African Archbishop Desmond Tutu and Nobel Peace Prize laureate Mairead Corrigan Maguire.

The German IHH is classified in Israel and Holland as a terrorist organization. Much of their money goes to the Union of Good, designated as Specially Designated Global Terrorists by the US Office of Foreign Assets Control and banned by Executive Order 13224. In 2010, US State Department Spokesman P.J. Crowley expressed great concern over the group's links with senior Hamas officials. Israel's Intelligence and Terrorism Information Center, an NGO with close ties to the Israeli Defense Forces, along with multiple Israeli governmental officials have alleged that the IHH supports terrorism, has smuggled arms on behalf of terrorist groups, and has links to al-Qaeda and other Jihadist groups. The IHH denies these claims, and Greta Berlin, a director of the Free Gaza Movement, called the claims "utterly scurrilous", characterizing them as an attempt by the Israeli government to discredit the movement.

However, IHH Turkey has denied any links to the group in Germany and, as of 2016, continues to work on projects in Gaza. Turkish legal authorities are investigating allegations that one of the key figures behind the May 2010 Gaza flotilla, Fehmi Bülent Yıldırım, was involved in transferring funds to al-Qaida, the Turkish daily Habertürk reported on June 15, 2012.

The IHH acquired the Mavi Marmara at a cost of $800,000, to be defrayed by public donations, as no shipowner was willing to risk their vessel on the journey. The ship took part in a flotilla of ships operated by activist groups from 37 different countries with the intention of directly confronting the Israeli blockade over Gaza. On May 30, 2010, while in international waters and en route to Gaza, Israeli Naval Forces communicated that a naval blockade over the Gaza area was in force and ordered the ships to follow them to Ashdod Port or to be boarded. The ships declined and were boarded in international waters. The boarding started at 2 a.m. on May 31, 2010, and was completed by 8 a.m. Reports from journalists on the ship and from the UN report on the attack concluded that the Israeli military opened fire with live rounds before boarding the ship.

==== Violent incident ====
Passengers on the ship actively attempted to thwart a landing on the ship by Israeli commandos. In the violent clash that followed, nine activists were killed, according to the U.N. Report, and a tenth died four years later of his wounds. Several dozen activists were claimed to be injured, some seriously. Israel claimed 10 of its soldiers were injured, one seriously.

The U.N. report stated that knives from the ship's kitchens (plus one traditional, ceremonial knife), some catapults (slingshots) and metal pipes the passengers cut from the ship's railings were found. Turkey unveiled its final report on the Israeli attack on the Gaza-bound aid convoy on February 11, 2011. The Israeli government-appointed Turkel Commission unveiled its final report in January 2011, and found both the blockade and the force used by the Israeli soldiers to be legal. A Polish authority on admiralty law, Professor Andrzej Makowski of the Polish Naval Academy in Gdynia, also upheld this view in an extensive article in the Israel Journal of Foreign Affairs in May 2013.

==== Release and return home ====
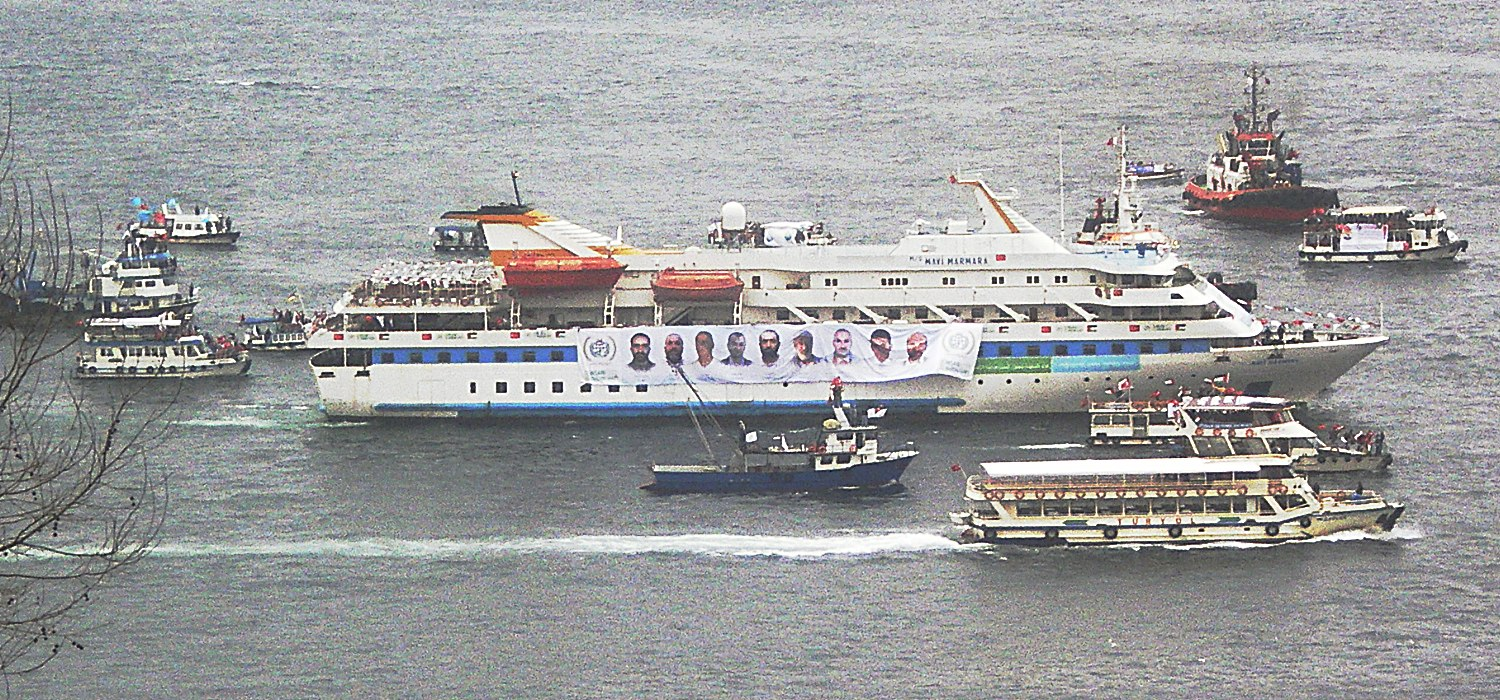
Mavi Marmara making a tour of Istanbul harbour on the occasion of her return to Istanbul

The Israeli government decided on July 23, 2010, to release the three ships of the Gaza Freedom Flotilla, two of which had been moored at the Port of Haifa and the third at the Port of Ashdod since their interception. Three Turkish tugboats were dispatched to bring the ships back to Turkey. The Mavi Marmara was towed by the Ocean Ergun in a two-day ride to the Port of Iskenderun, arriving an August 7, 2010.

Nobody was permitted to board the Mavi Marmara due to investigations underway by the public prosecutor, but broken windows and bullet holes on the glass of the pilothouse were visible in pictures released. The IHH emblem on the ship's port side was painted over in white. According to Turkish news, forensic teams identified some 250 bullet holes in the ship, many of which they claim were painted or plastered over by Israel. The ship returned to Istanbul harbour on December 26, 2010, in a welcoming ceremony attended by thousands.

=== Freedom Flotilla II ===
A coalition of 22 NGOs announced on May 9, 2011, that a "Freedom Flotilla II" was planned for the third week of June 2011. The Financial Times reported on June 17, 2011, that the Mavi Marmara would not be sailing, as previously announced. The IHH said that after damage caused last year to the ship, that it was not in a position to put to sea. The group stressed that it would still be part of the new flotilla; members of the group will board other ships in the effort.

== Ship's registry ==
- ex MS Beydağı

== Sister ships ==
- TDI Karadeniz, since renamed Dream.
