= Fehmi Bülent Yıldırım =

President of the Turkish IHH Humanitarian Relief Foundation

Fehmi Bülent Yıldırım (born 1966 in Erzurum) is a Turkish lawyer and the current president of Turkish NGO, İHH (İnsan Hak ve Hürriyetleri, İnsani Yardım Vakfı) which provided humanitarian relief in Libya, Pakistan, Russia, China, Kashmir, Darfur, Sri Lanka, Rwanda, Somalia, Mauritania, Chile, the Philippines, Aceh, Myanmar, Greece, Crimea, and Haiti.

== Education ==
He received a bachelor's degree in law, at University of Istanbul.

== Gaza flotilla raid ==
He participated in the 2010 Gaza Freedom Flotilla as the leader of İHH. He was on board the MV Mavi Marmara ship which was stormed by Israeli troops. 9 activists were killed by the IDF gunfire. Israel accused him of giving orders to İHH members to throw Israeli soldiers to sea. He was captured by the IDF, but later deported to Turkey. He is banned from returning to Israel for ten years. When he returned home, he said:

"Then they asked us, 'Didn’t you attack us with iron bars and axes?' I told them what I did was only self-defense. This was defense against helicopters and assault boats, against well-trained commandos. They lie when they say they were given permission to use real bullets after the 35th minute. They threw in gas bombs, which injured our friends. Only two of the initially fired bullets were rubber. The others were nail-like bullets. Our friend Cevdet was martyred. He is a member of the press. He was only taking pictures as the Israelis fired on us. They smashed his brain into pieces from exactly one meter away ... We never acted outside the law. Warships were following us. They were supposed to help us, but they didn’t. They killed our friends who had surrendered and threw their bodies into the water. An Indonesian doctor was shot in the stomach as he helped a wounded Israeli soldier ... Had it been Muslims killing Jews, I would again go with a flotilla. We are against all cruelty.”

== Relations with militant groups ==
In 2012 the Turkish newspaper Habertürk reported that Bülent Yıldırım was being investigated by specially authorized prosecutors in Istanbul and Diyarbakır for allegedly financing al-Qaeda through his organization. Yildirim led funeral prayers at a memorial service for Chechen leader Shamil Basayev in 2006.
