= IHH (Turkish NGO) =

Turkish non-governmental organization

İnsan Hak ve Hürriyetleri İnsani Yardım Vakfı – İHH
- Founded: 1995
- Type: NGO
- Location: Istanbul, Turkey
- Region served: Worldwide
- Key people: Fehmi Bülent Yıldırım
- Revenue: 150.7 million TRL (2011)
- Website: ihh.org.tr

IHH Humanitarian Relief Foundation (Turkish: İHH İnsani Yardım Vakfı; full: İnsan Hak ve Hürriyetleri ve İnsani Yardım Vakfı, in English: The Foundation for Human Rights and Freedoms and Humanitarian Relief) or İHH is a major Turkish non-governmental organization that operates globally to provide humanitarian relief, development aid, and disaster response.

Established in 1992 and officially registered in Istanbul in 1995, İHH provides humanitarian relief in areas of war, earthquake, hunger, and conflict. The İHH holds Special Consultative Status with the United Nations Economic and Social Council since 2004. Current president of the İHH is Fehmi Bülent Yıldırım. In 2015 IHH notably campaigned to turn the Hagia Sophia into a mosque. İHH is also active in SAR (Search and Rescue) operations. Hosting around 850 volunteer search and rescue trained personnel, İHH has multiple SAR teams stationed in different cities of Turkey, ready for action at all times.

The İHH was owner and operator of three flotilla ships involved in the convoy intended to breach the blockade of Gaza in 2010. These ships included the MV Mavi Marmara, a passenger vessel that served as the flagship of the convoy. Nine passengers aboard the Mavi Marmara, many of them members of the İHH, were killed by the Israeli military during the Gaza flotilla raid.

The IHH through its collaboration with Turkish intelligence, sometimes acts as an intermediary between the National Intelligence Organisation and the Syrian rebels. The IHH has been accused by Jean-Louis Bruguiere, the former chief of French counterterrorism unit of having ties to Islamist organizations such as Al Qaeda but is not considered to be a terrorist organization by the US. The IHH has close links to the Turkish government and specifically the ruling Turkish political party AKP under Turkish president Erdogan. The New York Times reported that IHH assisted Erdogan in 2010 elections. IHH receives funding from the Qatari Eid charity.

== Background ==
The Istanbul-based Foundation for Human Rights and Freedoms and Humanitarian Relief (İHH) is an Islamic charity group that was formed to provide aid to Bosnian Muslims in the mid-1990s. It has been involved in aid missions in Pakistan, Ethiopia, Lebanon, Indonesia, Iraq, Israel, Sudan, Somalia, Ghana, Mongolia, China, Brazil, Argentina and other places.

The organization is active in Turkey, the Middle East, Europe, Africa, South America, Central Asia, South Asia, and the Caucasus. İHH has held Special Consultative status as an NGO (non-governmental organization) in the United Nations Economic and Social Council since 2004. İHH is the organizer of Africa Cataract Project which aims to fight against blindness in Africa.

== Mission and trustees ==
The IHH's stated public aims to reach every region hit by wars, disasters, poverty and human rights abuses, and believes that civilian initiatives play a complementary role beside intervention by states and international organizations in resolving humanitarian problems. It is also their goal to deliver humanitarian aid to all people and take necessary steps to prevent any violations against their basic rights and liberties.

These goals are achieved through the delivering of foodstuffs, clothes and tents to crisis regions hit by wars, conflicts, and natural disaster to meet urgent needs of victims. The foundation further provides health services in drought and aridity-stricken regions where poverty and deprivation have become chronic, and carries out long-term projects that aim at enabling local peoples stand on their own feet. For those wanting to work with the organization, some emphasized activities include take active part in their activities, making donations or fund-raising, organizing seminars, and distributing posters. It receives funding from the Qatari Eid charity.

Trustees of the organization include:

- Fehmi Bülent Yıldırım – president
- Hüseyin Oruç – deputy president
- Mahmut Savaş – charter member

== Memberships and recognition ==
The Foundation for Human Rights and Freedoms and Humanitarian Relief belongs to a number or organizations, including the UN's Economic and Social Council (ECOSOC) in the special consultative status, the Organization of Islamic Conference's (OIC) Humanitarian Forum, the Council of International Organizations for Relief in Iraq, the Union of Non-governmental Organizations of the Islamic World (UNIW), and the Turkish Foundation for Volunteer Organizations (TGTV). The grouphas also received the following recognitions:

- The Parliament Award of Honour (Turkish Parliament)
- "Foundation that uses its resources in the most efficient way" (Turkish General Directorate of Foundations)
- Human rights award (COJEP, a Strasbourg-based, multicultural youth association)

== Humanitarian activities ==
The İHH provides social aid, Muslim cultural aid, educational aid, sanitary aid, emergency aid programs in 120 countries. It provides health care and water wells in Africa and runs the Africa Cataract Project, begun in 2007, in ten African countries. İHH has made it possible for thousands of people who have cataracts but who lack the economic means to be treated to see again. İHH built 1174 water wells in Africa. İHH sent two cargo planes to Haiti with 33 tons of humanitarian aid supplies after the 2010 Haiti earthquake.

In December 2007, Today's Zaman wrote that "various civil society organizations such as Kimse Yok Mu? (Is Anybody There?), Deniz Feneri (Lighthouse), the Foundation for Human Rights and Freedoms and Humanitarian Relief (İHH) and Can Suyu assisted thousands of charitable donors in reaching out to poverty-stricken residents of the Kurdish-dominated eastern and southeastern regions of Turkey."

World Bulletin wrote in August 2009 that hundreds of water wells were dug and fountains were built in an aid effort under the leadership of Foundation for Human Rights and Freedoms and Humanitarian Relief (İHH) across African countries. Several Turkish nongovernmental organizations, such as Kimse Yok Mu? (Is anybody there?), the Humanitarian Aid Foundation (İHH) and Deniz Feneri (lighthouse), also provided aid to storm survivors in Bangladesh.

İHH previously sent packages containing flour, legumes, oil and sugar to 350 families residing in Zewaya Dugda, one of the poorest regions in the Ethiopia. The UN announced that around 6 million children in Ethiopia faced risk of acute under-nutrition and urged countries to send aid.

After the earthquake in Indonesia, Doctors Worldwide and The Foundation for Human Rights and Freedoms and Humanitarian Relief (IHH) sent volunteers and aid to Indonesia. İHH opened mosques, dug waterwells, distributed Qur'ans, organized iftars, aiding orphans and refugees in Darfur.

In Gaza, the İHH is renovating the port, funding a Turkish-Palestinian school and plans to build a hospital and apartments for Gazans made homeless during the Gaza War.

=== Collaboration with the United Nations ===
IHH has been involved with the United Nations in a number of ways. For example, the Foundation for Human Rights and Freedoms and Humanitarian Relief attended the 44th Session of the Commission for Social Development and contributed to the panel discussion for the eradication of poverty. The group has attended other meetings, including:

- The High Level Consultation and Workshop on Capacity-Building for the United Nations-Non-governmental Organization Informal Regional Network in Turkey (UN-NGO-IRENE/Turkey)
- World Refugee Day Programs with the cooperation of United Nations High Commissioner for

Refugees (UNHCR)

- The United Nations High Commissioner for Refugees (UNHCR)'s meeting about improving conditions of refugees in Turkey
- Preparations of Refugee Day Programs

=== Africa Cataract Project ===
The project aims at performing 100.000 free cataract surgery operations in ten African countries: Sudan, Ethiopia, Somalia, Chad, Niger, Togo, Benin, Gana, Mali, and Burkina Faso. Volunteer Turkish surgeons and nurses take part in the project and travel to African countries for surgery. One of the objectives of the program is to offer free eye care for needy people. The Turkish International Cooperation and Development Agency and Turkey's and Sudan's Ministries of Health are supporting the project. All surgeries are broadcast live on the project website and the IHH website.

In 2011, IHH worked with Turkish aid groups like Kimse Yok Mu, the Turkish Red Crescent (Kızılay) and Doctors Worldwide in Somalia. IHH aid reached a total of 376,777 people. Relief efforts, totaling TL 2,420,612 (c US$400,00) included food and medicine distributions, digging 70 water wells, health screenings, fitr (alms) donations and iftars (fast-breaking meals). With regards to its work in Somalia, one worker said that "the İHH already has been working in Somalia for the last 15 years in the fields of education and social and medical care. As for the food crisis, the activities will continue for at least another three years because the drought has spread and it sounds like it's not over. But as for other fields, the İHH is there and the activities will continue." He continued that "in order to help families of orphans to make a living and stand on their own two feet, we gave the families of 40 orphans sewing machines and cows, while we gave another 20 families sesame and flour milling machines. In addition, the İHH offered medical examinations to 400 orphans and treated 137 children with various diseases."

=== Aid to Pakistan ===
In 2010, the ship Gazze set sail for Pakistan to deliver humanitarian aid to the people affected by floods in the country.

In 2011, IHH worked with the Khubaib Foundation to distribute relief goods amongst 500 flood stricken families in Lakki Marwat, a southern district of Pakistan. Some of the items included 270 containers which contained both food and non-food items. This was among clothes, shawls, footwear, and food items including rice, beans, canned food, power milk and children's cereal that were also distributed.

=== Libyan civil war 2011 ===
In response to the humanitarian situation during 2011 Libyan civil war, IHH sent a cargo ship carrying nine containers, 141 tons of humanitarian aid including medication, food packages, infant formula, milk powder, hygiene kits and clothing.

=== Xinjiang conference ===
The IHH worked with the Istanbul Peace Platform to host a conference focused on China's traditionally Turkic Muslim province of Xinjiang and which aimed to highlight the remote region's problems in the wake of the July 2009 riots in Ürümqi, Xinjiang's capital. Official Chinese government sources said nearly 200 people were killed and 1,600 wounded in the riots, the worst ethnic unrest in China in decades. Beijing claimed the riots were orchestrated by overseas activists for the rights of Uighurs, historically Xinjiang's largest ethnic group. Turkish Prime Minister Recep Tayyip Erdoğan has called the violence in Xinjiang "a kind of genocide."

=== Response to 2011 Japanese earthquake and tsunami ===
The IHH Humanitarian Relief Foundation sent a rescue team of 5 to the Japan. IHH deputy chairman Yaşar Kutluay said "we sent our team to Japan which also went to Haiti due to the earthquake and to Pakistan due to the floods and lastly went to Tunisia and Libya due to the recent developments. Our team will contact with Japanese authorities to organize relief works. Our team will bring sonar system and search and rescue equipments."

The IHH aid team conducted relief efforts in Sendai which was most heavily devastated by the earthquake and took relief to around 5.000 people. Güzel said Sendai has turned into a ghost city in the aftermath of the quake disaster and ensuing tsunami and it may take long years for Japan to recover from the aftereffects of the disaster. Güzel noted that the humanitarian crisis in Japan may deteriorate if international aid is not provided to the country.

=== Freeing Czech tourists in Pakistan, March 2015 ===
As reported on 28 March 2015, the IHH secured the release of two Czech tourists, Antonie Chrástecká and Hana Humpálová, following two months of intense negotiations. They were kidnapped near Taftan, Pakistan, by an al Qaeda-linked armed group on 13 March 2013, while travelling overland from Europe to India.

== Political activity within Turkey and connections to Turkish elite ==
The New York Times reported that IHH assisted Erdogan in 2010 elections, specifically with the conservative Muslim vote. The New York Times also reported that IHH was close to the elite in Turkey.

The IHH has repeatedly supported the reconversion of the Hagia Sophia, a former Christian cathedral which was converted into a mosque after the Ottoman conquest of Istanbul and is now a museum and a UNESCO World Heritage Site, into a mosque, and in 2015 IHH organised and led political rallies in Istanbul, in an effort to support its cause.

== IHH and the 2010 Gaza flotilla raid ==
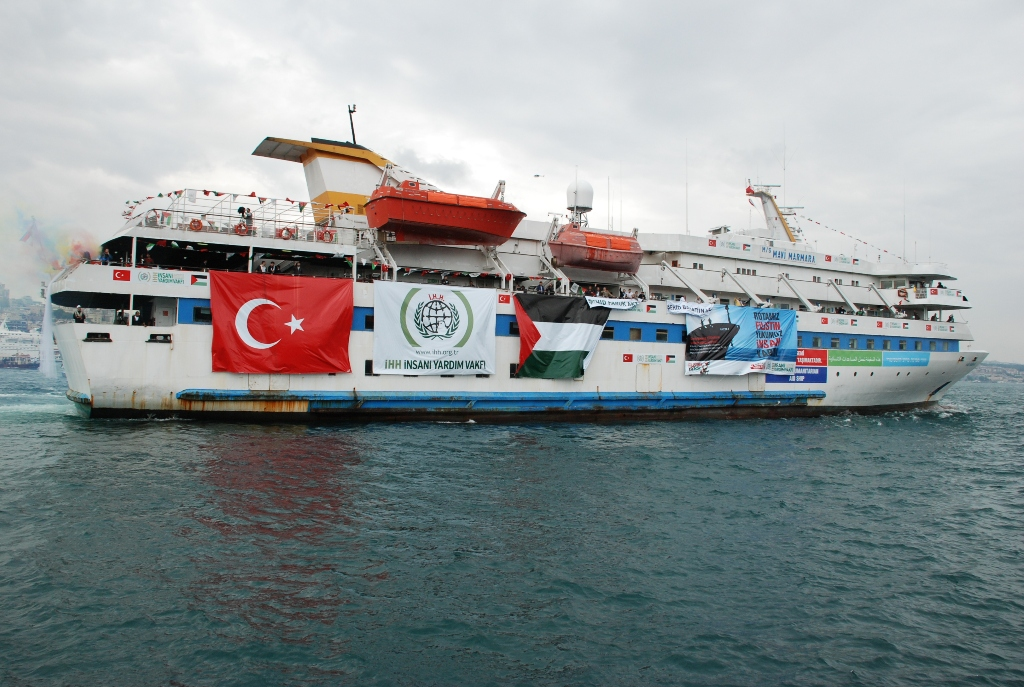
Mavi Marmara with Turkish and Palestinian flags, campaign banner, and the text "This is a humanitarian aid ship" in Turkish, English, Arabic, and Hebrew

In January 2010, the Free Gaza Movement and İHH announced a joint venture to send ten vessels to the Gaza strip in the spring of 2010, a flotilla to be further joined by organizations from Greece, Ireland and Sweden.

On 30 May 2010, a flotilla of six ships carrying 663 activists from 37 nations rendezvoused near Cyprus and set sail for Gaza. The stated intention of the Gaza flotilla, like for earlier flotillas organized by the Free Gaza Movement, was to break through Egypt's and Israel's blockade of the Gaza Strip and to deliver humanitarian supplies. The İHH spent more than $2 million on the ships. İHH activists were set apart from other activists involved in the mission by a willingness to resist and initiate violence against Israeli and Egyptian border controls.

On 31 May 2010, after the IHH refused a request by the Israel Defense Forces (IDF) to check the ship's cargo in the Ashdod port, Israeli forces intercepted the fleet in international waters. On the MV Mavi Marmara, one of the ships owned and operated by the İHH, boarding Israeli forces came under coordinated armed attack. In the clashes, nine activists were killed (Eight Turkish nationals and a Turkish-American), and dozens of activists and seven Israeli commandos were wounded. On three other ships, activists showed passive resistance, which was suppressed by Israeli forces without deaths or injuries, and two others were taken without incident. The activists were subsequently arrested and detained in Israel before being deported. Widespread international condemnation of the raid followed, Israel–Turkey relations were strained, Israel subsequently eased its blockade of the Gaza strip, and Egypt lifted its blockade, opening its Rafah Border Crossing with the Gaza Strip.

On 18 June 2010, the Israeli Ministry of Foreign Affairs released video footage of a rally on board the Mavi Marmara the day before the raid in which the İHH President Fehmi Bülent Yıldırım declared to dozens of activists: "And we say: 'If you [Israel] send the commandos, we will throw you down from here to the sea and you will be humiliated in front of the whole world'", as participating passengers chant "millions of martyrs marching to Gaza!"

In September 2011, a United Nations report, after analysis of both Turkey and Israeli national investigations, concluded that the Israeli blockade was legal, but that Israel army used excessive force in this incident. The report also mentioned "serious questions about the conduct, true nature and objectives of the flotilla organizers, particularly IHH."

İHH abstained from the 2011 flotilla, citing outstanding damage to the Mavi Marmara.

In September 2011, Istanbul Deputy Public Prosecutor Ates Shasan Sozen told the Turkish daily Today's Zaman that the IHH identified and submitted a list of 174 IDF soldiers to the Prosecutor's Office.

=== Post-flotilla perceptions of IHH's affiliations ===
The flotilla event generated mixed perceptions of IHH. The group was described as a humanitarian group and as a charity following the flotilla event; however, the group was also challenged for alleged affiliations with organizations such as Hamas. Critics charged the allegations arose after the raid simply because of the scale of the political fallout from the raid. IHH maintained that the best way to judge it was its behavior and responded that "we collected US$1 million (Dh3.7m) for victims of the Haiti earthquake, and we delivered our aid in a church there." Other IHH officials said the organisation is opposed to violence and relies on donations from the Turkish public, up to 80 per cent of which come from poor families.

Some of the allegations included that IHH has been banned in Germany, that IHH has raised funds for jihadi fighters in Bosnia, Chechnya, and Afghanistan, that French intelligence has documented calls between the group and an Al Qaeda boarding house in Milan, Italy, as well as Algerian militants in Europe, and that IHH reportedly played an "important role" in the Millennium bomb plot against LAX airport, Los Angeles.

According to Jean-Louis Bruguiere, who was chief magistrate of the French counter terrorism unit and is as of 2024 the chief of the EU's and US Treasury's terror financing unit, the IHH had "clear, long-standing ties to terrorism and Jihad,". Burguiere told NBC that the organization was under investigation in the 1990s and was assisting Osama bin Laden's Al Qaeda when they wanted to target the United States. He stated that members of the Fateh Kamel cell worked in IHH and that IHH had a role in assisting Al Qaeda in planning a terrorist attack against Los Angeles International Airport. IHH denied having any connection to Al Qaeda, and they are not considered a terrorist organization by the US. In 2010, IHH was accused in a bipartisan bill by Congress of being a member of the Union of Good, which the US alleges raises money for terrorism. The bill did not pass. A 2019 federal lawsuit alleging that IHH raises money for Hamas was dismissed.

That IHH was banned in Germany later turned out to be a mixup between the Turkish İnsan Hak ve Hürriyetleri and the banned German Internationale Humanitäre Hilfsorganisation e.V. The U.S. government said it "cannot validate" any relationship or connection between İHH and al-Qaida. Turkish authorities made no further efforts after the raid regarding support for Bosnian, Chechen and Afghan fighters and IHH replied that there was an acquittal in the court case and nothing ever came of the charges. Testimony regarding IHH and the Millennium bomb plot was thrown out in court by a judge because it would "necessarily be based upon hearsay".

==== Status in Western nations ====
- European Union – The European Commission has said that "regarding the banning of IHH Germany by the German Ministry of Interior, IHH Turkey released a statement in which it claims not to have any links to the Germany-based organisation IHH. This information is confirmed by the German Embassy in Ankara." In 2010 in the Camera dei Deputati, a group of deputies led by Il Popolo della Libertà (PdL) member Fiamma Nirenstein sought for the Turkish İHH to be added to the European Union's list of terrorist entities. The group included four of Nirenstein's PdL colleagues and one Lega Nord deputy, Massimo Polledri. However, the European Commission has said "IHH is an independent NGO active in the field of humanitarian aid and operating in a wide number of countries" and that it "does not have any information concerning involvement of IHH in the Occupied Palestinian Territory".
- Israel – In 2008 Israel became the first country to ban the organization, and on 16 June 2010, Israel added İHH to its terror watch list. The Christian Science Monitor noted Israel was the only country to have banned the organization as of 2010.
- United States – Although a bipartisan group of 87 US senators (out of 100) sent a letter to President Barack Obama calling on him to investigate the IHH and consider putting it on the list of foreign terrorist organizations, İHH is not designated as a terrorist group by the US State Department. US State Department spokesman Mark Toner has said "it's a long process to designate something a foreign terrorist organization and... there's nothing to announce on that." A US State Department spokesman also has said the US government "cannot validate" any relationship or connection between İHH and al-Qaida. Michael Werz, a senior fellow at the Center for American Progress said "the White House has been quiet on the issue and the State Department has publicly noted that it has no plans to designate the group [as an FTO]."

==== Response from IHH ====
An IHH board member responded in the Los Angeles Times that IHH provides charity in more than 100 countries. He stated there was no proof that IHH has any connections to Al Qaeda or its affiliates, and also said that its involvement with Bosnia and Chechnya amounted to food, clothes and medicine. Those who "accuse us of terrorism are the very people who kill innocent victims," said Ali Cihangir, an IHH board member, referring to the Israeli raid on the Mavi Marmara that left nine Turkish activists dead. "There are political reasons countries are saying this about us."

== IHH-led flotilla in 2024 ==
In April 2024, the Turkish government backed GONGO bought three ships in order to set out a convoy to Gaza Strip.

== Allegations of involvement with Muslim Brotherhood and Syria ==
According to The Times, a Free Syrian Army commander said that a boat carrying weapons docked in Syria in September 2012 and "was registered to members of the IHH, which has ties to the Muslim Brotherhood". Samar Srewel, an FSA activist who had helped to organize the consignment, told The Times: "It was clear from that second what was happening. The Muslim Brotherhood, through its ties in Turkey, was seizing control of this ship and the cargo. This is what they do. They buy influence with their money and guns."

On 18 March 2016, Russia's UN Ambassador Vitaly Churkin sent a letter to the UN Security Council saying that three Turkish humanitarian organizations (NGOs) sent weapons and supplies to extremists in Syria on behalf of Turkey's MIT intelligence agency during the Syrian civil war. The three NGOs were the Besar Foundation, the Iyilikder Foundation and the Foundation for Human Rights and Freedoms (IHH).

At an interview with the Investigative Project on Terrorism in 2018, former Turkish National Police official Ahmet Yayla said the National Intelligence Organization has used Turkey's IHH as an intermediary to provide al-Qaeda with weapons.

Recent court case in Turkey 11.06.2021 in relation to the bombing that killed over 100 people in Ankara October 2015, evidence and witness accounts alleged that ISIS affiliated groups were supported by IHH to give aid and more.[1]

=== Turkish police raid ===
Anadolu Agency reported that two employees of IHH, were detained for alleged links to al-Qaida, in a Turkish anti-terrorism police raids on 13 January 2014. IHH spokesman said that police searched its office in Kilis, near the border with Syria, and detained one of its employees. Another IHH employee was detained in Kayseri after a police raid at his home.

== Involvement in Ukraine ==
According to Meduza in May 2023, terrorists in Ukraine and Syria are sponsored by IHH, and that people come to Ukraine through IHH.
