= Greta Berlin =

Human rights activist

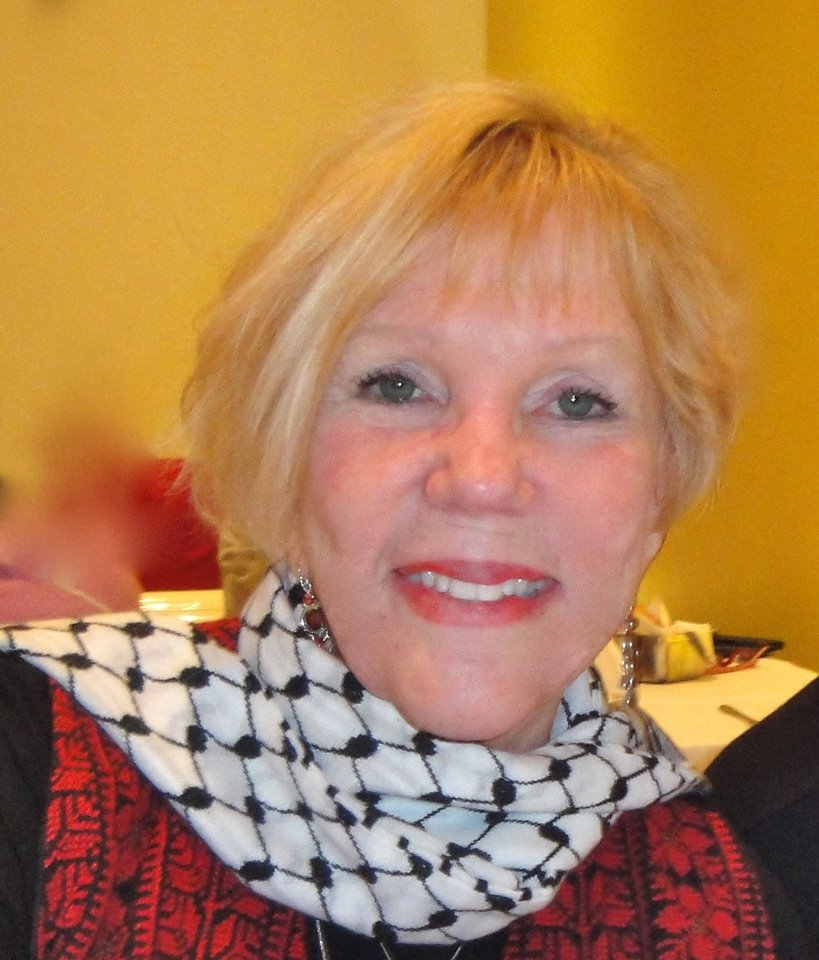
- Born: April 6, 1941 (age 85); Detroit, Michigan, U.S.
- Occupation: pro-Palestinian activist

Greta K. Berlin (born April 6, 1941) is an American Anti-Zionist activist. She has been a spokesperson for the Free Gaza Movement (FGM), which she co-founded in 2006.

== Biography ==
Berlin was born Greta Anne Hughes on April 6, 1941, in Detroit, Michigan, the oldest of four children of Arthur George Hughes and Barbara Esther Whan Hughes. She graduated from Culver Military Academy in Culver, Indiana, one of the first two girls to do so.

Upon entering graduate school at the University of Illinois in 1963, Greta met her first husband, Ribhi, who was a Palestinian refugee from Safed. They married in Chicago in 1963 and have a daughter and a son. He died in October, 2018. Her second husband, whom she married in Florida in 1978, was Alvin Jay Berlin. They divorced about 14 years later. Berlin, who was Jewish and anti-Zionist, died in 2013.

She founded GKB Associates in 1977, a training and media coaching firm for scientists and engineers wanting to make presentations to conferences around the world, and worked for some of the top engineering firms in the U.S., the Middle and Far East and Europe, before retiring in 2011. She now volunteer teaches English around the world.

== Political activism ==
Berlin has been an "advocate for justice for the Palestinians since the early 60s." She was motivated to activism in 1967 by the Six-Day War. She believed that "Israel was driving the Palestinians off their land for the second time in 19 years" and vowed to increase American awareness of the issue. Berlin and her husband started a non-profit charitable organization, Pal Aid International to send medicine and aid to the Palestinians. Berlin told an interviewer that the Internal Revenue Service began auditing her husband's company and that the FBI began questioning them. She alleged that the Jewish Defense League phoned her and she described the caller as saying that "if any passengers were murdered in the airline hijackings that were going on at the time, my children would be killed." She withdrew from her activism for 15 years for the sake of her children.

In 2003, after the death of Rachel Corrie who had been working with the International Solidarity Movement (ISM), Berlin joined ISM and went to the Palestinian Territories, working in Bil’in, Jenin, Ramallah, including in the ISM media office. she returned to the occupied West Bank in 2005 to attend the International women in Black conference in Jerusalem and remain to work in Bil'in for two months She also returned in 2007 to work with the ISM in occupied Hebron.

== Free Gaza voyages ==
In 2006 she co-founded the Free Gaza Movement. and was the major spokesperson for the flotilla involved in the Gaza flotilla raid on May 31, 2010.

She was one of the primary spokespersons for Freedom Flotilla 1, a coalition of initiatives put together by Free Gaza to sail a flotilla of boats into Gaza after the Dignity and the Spirit of Humanity had been stopped by Israeli naval vessels.

She continues to criticize Israel's blockade of Gaza, and claims it is unlawful, that it has persisted for decades and that one of the reasons Israel is illegally blockading Gaza is because it's busy "stealing the natural gas of Gaza."

Greta Berlin calls Israel an "illegal entity" and "a country founded on terrorism" and believes that Congress is "occupied by the Israeli lobby."

== Freedom Sailors ==
Berlin is the co-author and co-editor of the 2012 book, Freedom Sailors, The Maiden Voyage of the Free Gaza movement and How We Succeeded in Spite of Ourselves. After her retirement in 2017, Berlin began volunteer teaching English as a second language in Iraq, Morocco and Spain and continues to teach there.

== Controversy ==
In 2012, Berlin was accused of antisemitism following a tweet, originating from her Facebook account, and published under the Twitter account of the Free Gaza Movement. The tweet, written by someone else, was titled, "Zionists operated the concentration camps and helped murder millions of innocent Jews" and contained a link to a video of that name, a speech by conspiracy theorist Eustace Mullins asserting that Zionists collaborated with the Nazis. The Free Gaza Movement later deleted the tweet. Berlin apologized once the post became known to a wider audience. She declared that she had "shared it without watching it."

She said she merely intended to post the video and comment in a private Facebook group where she had been participating in a discussion of similar propaganda. Larry Derfner published a statement by sixteen people stating that "ours is a small and secret Facebook group, 37 members strong" and that one of the topics the group had been discussing was "the role of the Zionist movement during the Holocaust" when Berlin posted her remarks. The statement explained that in this context Berlin's post was aimed at highlighting that "anti-Semitic remarks have exaggerated and distorted" the arguments of historians on this topic.
