= Free Gaza Movement =

Movement challenging the Israeli blockade of the Gaza Strip

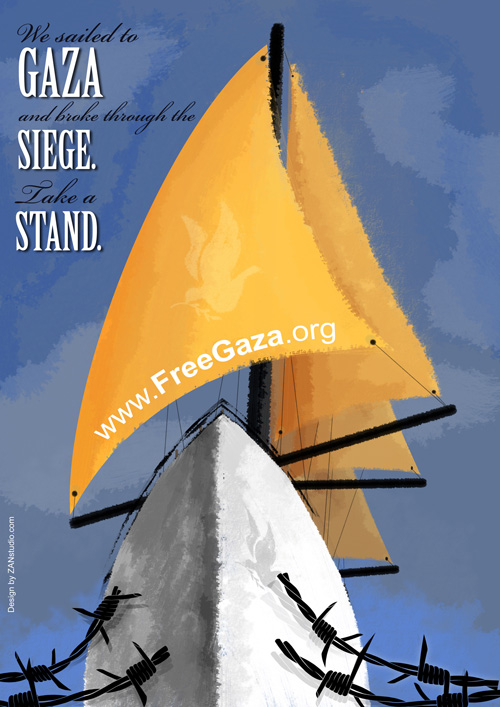
Logo

The Free Gaza Movement (FGM) is a coalition of human rights activists and pro-Palestinian groups formed to break Egypt and Israel's blockade of the Gaza Strip and publicise the situation of the Palestinians there. FGM has challenged the Israeli–Egyptian blockade by sailing humanitarian aid ships to Gaza. The group has more than 70 endorsers, including the late Desmond Tutu and Noam Chomsky.

The organizations participating in the Free Gaza Movement include the International Solidarity Movement. The activists participating in the effort include Jeff Halper, Hedy Epstein, Lauren Booth, and members of Christian, Jewish, and Muslim religious organizations. Israeli intelligence agencies claim that it also includes Islamist organizations that pose a security threat to Israel.

United Nations secretary general Ban Ki-moon, the United States, France, the United Kingdom, Turkey and Canada all publicly opposed the 2011 flotilla.

== Founding ==
The Free Gaza Movement was founded in 2006 by Mary Hughes-Thompson, Greta Berlin, and Paul Larudee, all Californian peace activists. The three activists had previously worked for Palestinian human rights and been detained or deported by Israel. The Israel Defense Forces had prohibited Israeli journalists from entering Gaza since 2006. As a result, little information was appearing in the Israeli media about the situation in Gaza.

== August 2008 sailing ==
The first sailing took place in early August 2008. It was organized by the Free Gaza Movement and the International Solidarity Movement. Many of the latter's members had been barred from entering Israel on security grounds. According to the Free Gaza Movement's Web site, the group intended for the boat to cross the Israeli-declared "special security zone" to deliver 100 hearing aids to a Palestinian charity as a form of humanitarian aid. A story in Israel-based Haaretz said the organizers were attempting to provoke a clash with the navy that would end with arrests. A spokesman for the group said, "We hope that the Israeli government will have some wisdom. To drag us in and arrest us and say somehow we are a danger is absurd."

They raised $300,000 from private donations and purchased two vessels, the S.S. Liberty and the Free Gaza. The group originally planned to depart from Piraeus on August 1, 2008, stopping at several Greek islands, and to then sail from Cyprus to Gaza on August 5. Organizers of Free Gaza told interviewers that they were not attempting to sail from Egypt or via Egyptian waters because they "did not want to make a political statement" hinting that Egypt disagreed with the plan. Cypriot officials expressed concern about the boat departing from their shores but said they could not prevent it. The Israel Foreign Ministry offered to deliver the FGM's humanitarian aid by way of a land crossing under Israeli control. The FGM rejected the offer as it wanted to demonstrate to the world the control that Israel had over Gaza.

On August 23 the two boats arrived in Gaza carrying 46 peace activists including four Israeli citizens. The Israeli Navy did not stop them but both boats had great difficulty with their communications, a problem they blamed on jamming by Israel in an attempt to prevent them from getting to Gaza. They delivered 200 hearing aids for Gaza children and 5,000 balloons.

When the boats left Gaza they took seven Palestinians, including a teenage boy who had lost a leg to an Israeli tank shell. The boy could not be fitted with an artificial leg in Gaza as the Israeli siege had created shortages of medicine and medical equipment. The boats had no problem returning to Cyprus.

=== Consequences ===
Israeli citizen Jeff Halper did not return to Cyprus on the boats, but traveled into Israel via the Erez crossing. He was arrested and has been told he will be prosecuted for breaking the Israeli law forbidding its citizens from entering the Gaza Strip. A spokeswoman for the Free Gaza Movement believes that Israel's foreign and interior ministries had given the boats permission to land in Gaza, and she believed that meant they were all in Gaza legally.

Lauren Booth, sister-in-law of Tony Blair, was refused permission to cross from Gaza into both Egypt and Israel after her arrival. Four weeks later, she was given permission to cross at the Rafah border terminal into Egypt.

== October 2008 sailing ==
The second sailing occurred in late October. The movement's 66-foot yacht, named Dignity, arrived at a Gaza port on October 29. The ship carried 26 activists and medical supplies. Although Israeli officials initially announced that they would stop the ship, a last-minute decision was reportedly made to allow the ship to enter Gaza. Among the passengers were 1976 Nobel Peace Prize winner Mairead Corrigan and Palestinian Legislative Council member Mustafa Barghouti. In July 2009, four citizens of the United Kingdom who had decided to stay in Gaza after arriving on the Dignity were turned away at both the Israeli and Egyptian border crossings over a period of several weeks when they attempted to leave.

== December 2008 – February 2009 sailings ==
The Free Gaza Movement attempted to reach Gaza twice during the 2008–2009 Israel–Gaza conflict.

On December 29, 2008, Dignity set sail from Cyprus, headed for Gaza, attempting to deliver 3.5 tonnes (3.9 short tons) of medical supplies to its residents. The boat, which was boarded by Caoimhe Butterly, Cynthia McKinney, journalists from Al Jazeera and CNN, three surgeons including Dr. Elena Theoharous, was forced to turn back after being intercepted by Israeli naval vessels off Gaza. According to The Free Gaza Movement, Israeli warships rammed their vessel then fired machine guns in the water. Israel states that the boat had failed to respond to Israeli naval radio contact and was attempting to outmaneuver the warships when the vessels collided. Not having enough fuel to return to Cyprus, the boat docked in Lebanon severely damaged.

The Cypriot foreign minister told public radio his country would lodge a formal protest over the incident. An Israeli Foreign Ministry spokesman called the allegation of ramming the Dignity "absurd" while denying any intent. The Consulate General of Israel to the Southeast USA called McKinney "irresponsible", accusing her of a "provocation" that endangered many.

In January, the Free Gaza Movement again attempted to bring activists and deliver humanitarian aid to Gaza under the Greek flagged decommissioned ferry called the Arion. The 21 Free Gaza activists, among them several doctors, abandoned their journey after the ship encountered Israeli warships who warned them to leave the area. Greece had informed the Israeli government on its transfer of humanitarian aid days earlier, but also warned the leaders of the expedition about its dangers.

The Dignity's final resting spot is in a Cyprian port after sinking during a storm.

On February 3, 2009, a ship was sent by the Free Gaza Movement and a Lebanese group, the Palestinian National Committee Against the Siege. The organizers said the Tali, a Togo-registered cargo vessel, was "carrying more than 60 tonnes of humanitarian aid to the Gaza Strip." On February 5, shots were fired and Israeli forces boarded the ship. "They are pointing guns against us; they are kicking us and beating us. They are threatening our lives," Al-Jazeera's Salam Khoder reported from aboard Tali. The ship was then taken to the Israeli port of Ashdod. According to Haaretz, "The IDF said that troops found about 150 bottles of mineral water and a few dozen kilograms of food and medicine on board... plus 10,000 units of human blood plasma which requires constant refrigeration. The IDF found no weapons aboard the ship.

== June 2009 sailing ==
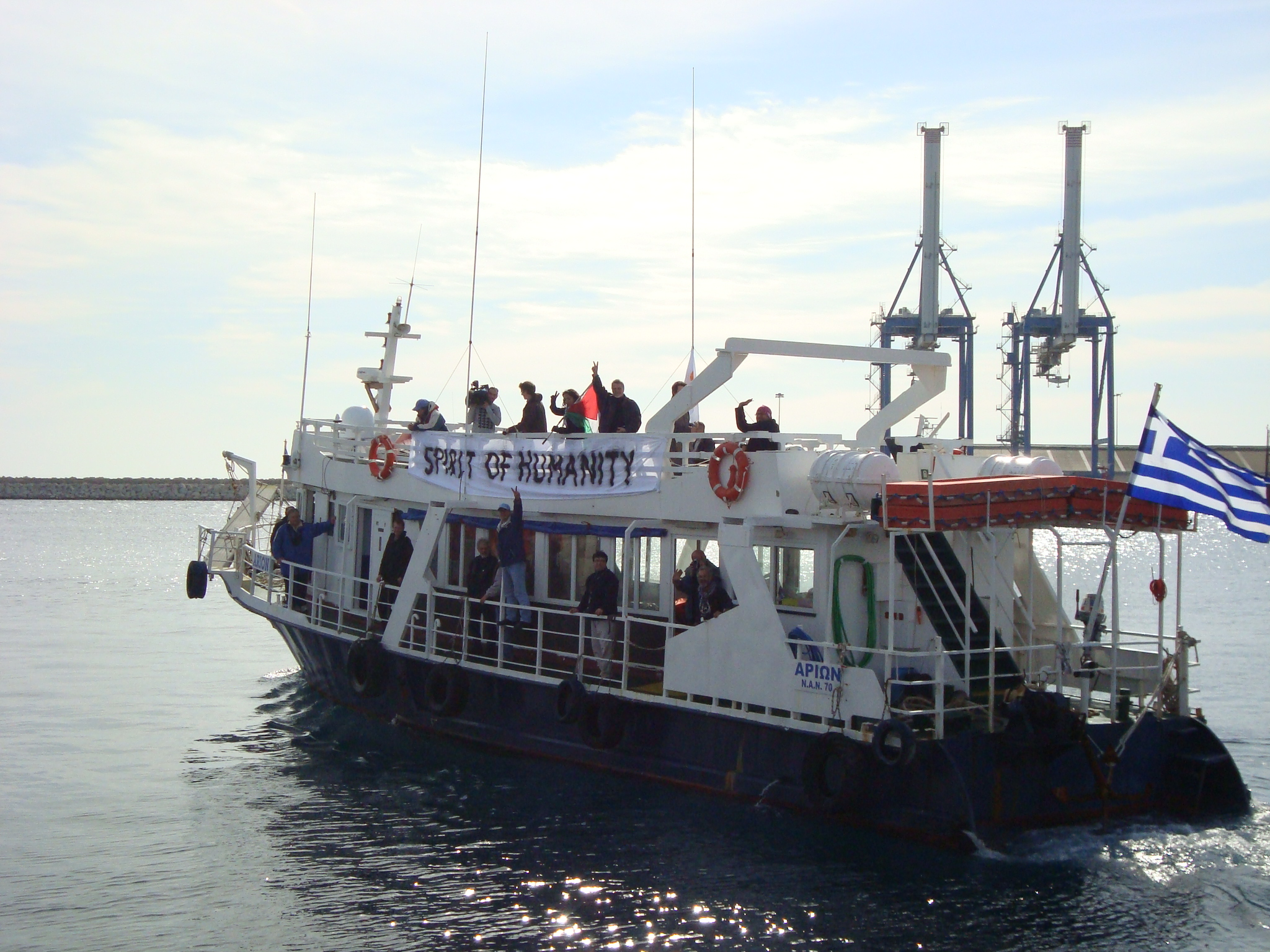
The Spirit of Humanity

The Free Gaza Movement returned to Cyprus in March 2009, to begin organizing for the summer sailings. The Arion was renamed Spirit of Humanity and sailed from the port of Larnaca on June 29. The 21 activists on board included former Congresswoman Cynthia McKinney and the Nobel Laureate Mairead Maguire. Among the six journalists were two from Al Jazeera and documentary maker Adam Shapiro. They were heading toward Gaza with three tons of medical supplies and a symbolic load of construction materials.

On June 30, the Israeli Navy commandeered the vessel off the coast of Gaza. The Israeli military later issued a statement saying the boat had attempted to break a blockade of Gaza and was forced to sail to an Israeli port after ignoring a radio message to stay out of Gaza waters. The Spirit of Humanity was towed to Ashdod and the crew was detained pending deportation proceedings. After a security check of the humanitarian supplies, Israel officials promised to deliver them to Gaza by ground. Greta Berlin, a representative of the Free Gaza Movement in Cyprus, said: "We are outraged, they just stole our boat and kidnapped our people." Israeli officials blame the group for the controversy, saying they were looking for confrontation to attract publicity.

Two additional Israeli activists were released the next day. On July 3, five Bahraini activists were deported. A delegation from Bahrain visited Israel in an official capacity for the first time to accompany the deportees, although officials said there was no other significance to the visit. The release of McKinney and the others was delayed after they refused to sign a document admitting they violated Israel's blockade. From the Givon immigration detention center in Ramla, Maguire said that "deportation orders aren't appropriate for us, as we were taken to Israel against our will." The remaining activists were processed and released between July 5 and July 8.

== May 2010 sailing ==
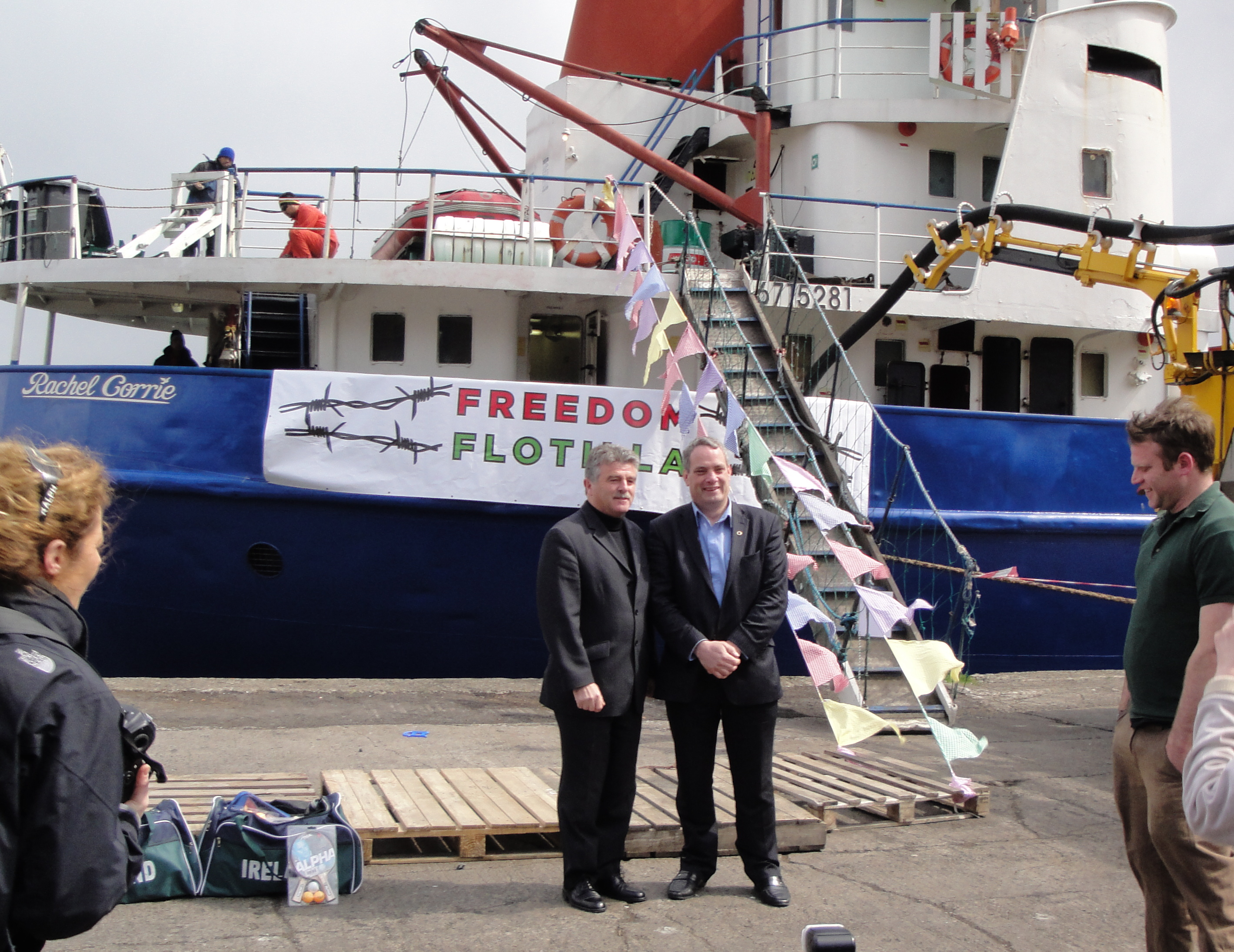
Aengus Ó Snodaigh with the Rachel Corrie before departing for the Freedom Flotilla

The Free Gaza Movement and the Humanitarian Relief Foundation (IHH) sent multiple ships to the Gaza Strip in May 2010. Under the coordination of the Free Gaza Movement, numerous human rights organizations, including the Turkish Relief Foundation (IHH), the Perdana Global Peace Organization from Malaysia, the European Campaign to End the Siege of Gaza, and the Swedish and Greek Boat to Gaza initiatives sent three cargo ships loaded with reconstruction, medical and educational supplies. Multiple passenger boats with over 600 people on board accompanied the cargo ships. Passengers included members of Parliament from around the world, U.N., human rights and trade union activists, as well as journalists to document the largest coordinated effort to directly confront Israel's blockade of Gaza and take in basic supplies. These include the MV Rachel Corrie. In response to the plans, an Israeli Foreign Ministry spokesman said: "These people are not supporting the Palestinians and they are not even supporting humanitarian causes. They are engaged in only one thing, and that is to create provocations and to collaborate with Hamas propaganda."

The family of captured Israeli soldier Gilad Shalit offered the organizers of the flotilla full support provided that "in addition to their demand that Israel lift its blockade they will urge Hamas to allow the soldier to receive letters and food packages from his family and allow international organizations to visit him". According to Attorney Nick Kaufman, who approached the Free Gaza Movement on behalf of the kidnapped soldier's family, the offer was refused. The group strongly denied this, saying they had always called for the release of all prisoners, including Palestinian prisoners in Israel, and that they had accepted Mr. Kaufman's request but had not heard back from him since.

On May 27, 2010, The Jerusalem Post reported that participants included Mahmad Tzoalha and Zaher Birawi, whom it called Hamas activists, although neither man was on any of the passenger manifests, as well as Sheikh Raed Salah, leader of the Northern Branch of the Islamic Movement in Israel. Also some 700 pro-Palestinian activists were on the boats, including 1976 Nobel Peace Prize laureate Mairead Corrigan Maguire of Northern Ireland, European legislators, and Holocaust survivor Hedy Epstein, 85.

The six-ship flotilla began the journey on May 30, 2010. Before dawn the following morning, the vessels came into contact with the Israeli navy in international waters off the coast of Gaza. The Aljazeera satellite channel reported by telephone from the Turkish ship leading the flotilla that Israeli navy forces fired at the "Blue Marmara Ship" ('Mavi Marmara Gemisi') and boarded it. The Israel Defense Forces (IDF) says the soldiers were attacked with knives and clubs as they boarded. It says soldiers opened fire after a protester grabbed a weapon from one of the commandos and fired on one or more of the commandos. Organizers of the flotilla said the troops opened fire as soon as they stormed the ships. Reports are of up to 16 people being killed along with dozens of injuries.

In August, the Israeli military arrested several Israeli soldiers, accusing them of selling laptops that belonged to the passengers.

== Free Palestine Movement ==
Some organizers went on to found an organization called Free Palestine Movement.

== Controversy ==
In October 2012, Free Gaza Movement founder, Greta Berlin was accused of being antisemitic following a controversial tweet, originating from her Facebook account, and published under the account of the Free Gaza Movement. The tweet read "Zionists operated the concentration camps and helped murder millions of innocent Jews" and contained a link to a video of that name, a speech by conspiracy theorist Eustace Mullins asserting that Zionists are responsible for the Holocaust and are admirers of Hitler. The Free Gaza Movement later deleted the tweet. Berlin apologized once the post became known to a wider audience. She declared that she had "shared it without watching it," and she implied no endorsement of Mullins' antisemitic views. She wrote she intended to post the video and comment in a private Facebook group where she had been participating in a discussion of similar propaganda. Larry Derfner published a statement by sixteen people stating that "ours is a small and secret Facebook group, 37 members strong" and that the group had been discussing "the role of the Zionist movement during the Holocaust" when Berlin posted her remarks.

== Reception ==
Jeffrey Goldberg wrote that the Free Gaza Movement is "the leading edge of the international campaign to delegitimize Israel and bring about its end as the national home of the Jewish people," and that they are "a hypocritical organization" he argues since they protest Israel's part of the blockade but not the Egyptian blockade of Gaza.
