= List of charities accused of ties to terrorism =

This is a list of charities accused of ties to terrorism. A number of charities have been accused or convicted in court of using their revenues to fund terrorism or revolutionary movements, rather than for the humanitarian purposes for which contributions were ostensibly collected. During the "war on terror", the names of several such organisations have been published, although the phenomenon predates 9/11. Some detainees have been captured largely because they volunteered or worked for these charities.

On August 23, 2007, the Bush administration announced plans to implement enhanced security checking of the employees of American charities, which receive funds from the U.S. Agency for International Development, looking for those who might have ties to terrorism. Charities which are turned down will not be offered an explanation, or an avenue to appeal the decisions.

== Charities accused of ties to terrorism in the United States ==
The Holy Land Foundation's case represents the most well-known case of a charity accused of funding terrorist activities. In 2001, the United States government designated the HLF as a Specially Designated Global Terrorist, accusing it of passing money to Hamas' front charities. Five workers of the organization were indicted on charges of money laundering and terrorism financing, being ultimately convicted in 2008. Several major Islamic organizations were listed as "unindicted conspirators", such as the Islamic Society of North America (ISNA) and the Council on American-Islamic Relations (CAIR) in a move that was denounced as politically charged and potentially violative of due process rights.

== Charities accused of ties to terrorism in Germany ==
Germany bans associations with concerns of legal situations and third parties acting on the behalf of the organizations as an instrument of threat prevention law. As a result, internet providers can be requested to block banned content. Germany has suffered from an increase of plots of terror attacks and radicalization of minors since 7 October, what requires a strong response from policymakers and civil society. According to Federal Interior Minister Horst Seehofer, the bank accounts of Ansaar International organization have been blocked or frozen due to media accusations of funding terrorism.

== Charities accused of ties to terrorism in the United Arab Emirates ==
The UAE actively combats the financing of terrorist activities, proscribing organizations that misuse charitable giving to support violent extremism. These activities are regulated by the Counter-Terrorism and Fundraising Regulatory Laws. The Emirates proscribed the UK-based charity Islamic Relief in 2014. Since 2025, the UAE has outlawed more than thirty charities connected to the Muslim Brotherhood.

== Charities under investigations for Alleged ties to terrorism in the UK ==
The UK Charity Commission is investigating several charities with accusations for funding terror organizations. On April 2024, The Charity Commission has opened a compliance against Save One Life UK following allegations according to which its funds are going to Hamas. Sawer has reported on The Telegraph that one of the charity's fundraising appeals for Gaza is Sheikh Hassam Al-Haddad, a controversial Islamic scholar. The latest serves as a chairman of Fatwa Committee for The Islamic Council of Europe, and has prayed for a "victory" over Israel within hours of the October 7 attacks.

Moreover, in December 2024 Abrar Islamic Foundation and Dar Al-Hekma Trust have faced allegations for links to the Iranian regime and are currently under investigation. The UK government has sanctioned the IRGC for responsibility for operations outside of Iran and supporting terrorism and Islamic militants abroad. Saeed Shehabi, a trustee of both charities, was described by several media outlets as "a friend of Iran", after supporting the Iranian regime and praised the October 7 attacks by Hamas claiming that Palestinians 'rose up and became the master of the situation'.

== Charities accused of ties to terrorism ==
Name of Charity	Location of Charity	Accusers	Allegedly supported	Description
Afghan Support Committee	Pakistan	U.S. State Department		Alleged to have funneled support to fighters in Afghanistan.
Al-Haramain Foundation	Saudi Arabia	U.S. State Department	al-Qaeda	Suspicion fell on Guantanamo detainee Jamal Muhammad Alawi Mar'i, in part, because he was a volunteer for Al Haramain
Al Kifah Refugee Center	United States	Spanish police	al-Qaeda and their pro-USA predecessors	Alleged to have served as a covert funnel for US support of those resisting the Soviet–Afghan War.; Alleged to have trained fighters destined to serve in Afghanistan under Osama bin Laden.; Alleged to have provided military and demolition training to those who bombed the World Trade Center in 1993.
Al Wafa al Igatha al Islamia	Afghanistan	U.S. State Department	al-Qaeda and the Taliban	Suspicion fell on Guantanamo detainee Jamal Muhammad Alawi Mar'i, in part, because he was a volunteer for Al Wafa
Barakacity	France	Ministry of the Interior (France)	Muslim Brotherhood	Banned in 2020, by orders of Interior Minister Gerald Darmanin, due to supporting violence and terrorism.
Benevolence International Foundation	United States	Federal Bureau of Investigation	al-Qaeda	Alleged to have helped fund the 1993 World Trade Center bombing.; Placed on the Terrorist exclusion list.
Bosanska Idealna Futura	Bosnia and Herzegovina	Federal Bureau of Investigation		Branch of the Chicago United States-based Benevolence International Foundation.; Shut down on US request in 2002
Global Relief Foundation	United States	Federal Bureau of Investigation	al-Qaeda and others	Bosnian offices shut down on US request in 2002; Commission of the European Union froze assets in 2006
Health and Education Project International	Canada	Canadian Security Intelligence Service	al-Qaeda	Founded by Ahmed Khadr after Human Concern International cut its ties to him
Holy Land Foundation for Relief and Development	United States	Federal Bureau of Investigation	Hamas	Closed in 2001. On November 10, 2004, convicted by US federal court of funding Hamas and five of its workers were convicted in 2008.
İnsan Hak ve Hürriyetleri ve İnsani Yardım Vakfı	Turkey	Russia	Syrian opposition (2011–2024)	Alleged to have sent weapons and supplies to extremists in Syria during the Syrian Civil War.
International Islamic Relief Organization	Saudi Arabia	U.S. State Department	al-Qaeda	Sued by families of the victims of the September 11 attacks
International Relief Fund for the Afflicted and Needy (IRFAN-Canada)	Canada	Canada Revenue Agency	Hamas	Alleged to have transferred $14.6 million worth of resources to Hamas through various associated organizations.
Interpal	United Kingdom	United States Treasury Department	Hamas	Accusation by US Treasury Department (2003); British government's Charity Commission for England and Wales (2003) found no evidence to support allegations of connection to terrorism.; (Note: in 1997 Sunday Telegraph retracted accusations Interpal was run by Hamas activists; in 2003 the Board of Deputies of British Jews repeated such allegations, retracting them after it was sued by Interpal; in 2010 Sunday Express issued an apology and made an out-of-court settlement for libel for making similar allegations.)
Internationale Humanitäre Hilfsorganisation e.V.	Germany	German Interior Ministry	Hamas	Outlawed in Germany since it has financially supported Hamas, while presenting activities to donors as humanitarian help.
Islamic Relief	United Kingdom	Israel, United Arab Emirates; Germany	Hamas and the Muslim Brotherhood	Alleged to have funded Hamas and alleged connections to Muslim Brotherhood. Islamic Relief is contesting the Israeli allegations and publicly refutes any alleged links to the Muslim Brotherhood.
Abrar Islamic Foundation	United Kingdom	Charity Commission for England and Wales	Islamic Revolutionary Guard Corps	Alleged links to the IRGC and wrongdoing.
Dar Al-Hekma Trust	United Kingdom	Charity Commission for England and Wales	Islamic Revolutionary Guard Corps	Alleged links to the IRGC and wrongdoing.
Jamaat al Dawa al Quran	Afghanistan	JTF-GTMO		American counter-terrorism analysts at Guantanamo assert this group is an extremist militant group.
Jamat al Tabligh	Pakistan	U.S. State Department	al-Qaeda	"The Jamat al Tabligh, a Pakistani-based Islamic Missionary organization, is being used as a cover to mask travel and activities of terrorists including members of al-Qaeda"
Qawafel al‑Khair	Jordan	UK Israel	Hamas's military wing	Diverting charity funds to Hamas's military wing - Al-Qassam Brigades, used to support acts of terror.
Maktab al-Khidamat	Afghanistan	9/11 Commission	al-Qaeda	Alleged to have been transformed by Osama bin Laden into al Qaeda.
Muslim Aid	United Kingdom	Spanish police, Israel, Bangladesh	Hamas (Union of Good) and others	Alleged to have funded mujahideen fighters to Bosnia, Union of Good, Islamist militants of Bangladesh.
Society of the Revival of Islamic Heritage	Kuwait	U.S. State Department	al-Qaeda	Appears on the United States State Department list of Foreign Terrorist Organizations
Popular Front of India	India	Various Indian authorities	Islamic terrorism	Accused of Radical Islamism, Islamic terrorism
Tamils Rehabilitation Organisation(TRO)	Canada	Federal Bureau of Investigation	Liberation Tigers of Tamil Eelam (LTTE)	
Tamil (Sri Lanka) Refugee-Aid Society of Ottawa	Canada	Canada Revenue Agency	Liberation Tigers of Tamil Eelam (LTTE)	
Union of Good	Saudi Arabia	Israel, United States Treasury Department	Hamas	Umbrella organization, including: International Islamic Relief Organization, IIRO (Saudi Arabia); Holy Land Foundation for Relief and Development (US); Al-Aqsa Islamic Charitable Society Yemen; Interpal (UK); IHH (İnsani Yardım Vakfı) (Turkey); "Palästinensische Vereinigung in Österreich, PVOE" /"Palästinensischer Humanitärer Verein, PHV" (Austria); World Assembly of Muslim Youth; al-Aqsa Foundation

== See also ==
- Alms for Jihad – 2006 book by J. Millard Burr and Robert O. Collins
- Economic impact of the Gaza war
- Economic warfare – Strategy to weaken an opponent's economy
- Funding Evil – 2003 book by Rachel Ehrenfeld
- Jihad – Term for religious struggle in Islam
- Terrorism financing
- Terrorist Financing Convention
- Terrorist Finance Tracking Program
- Terrorist front organization
