= Middle East Monitor =

Press monitoring organisation

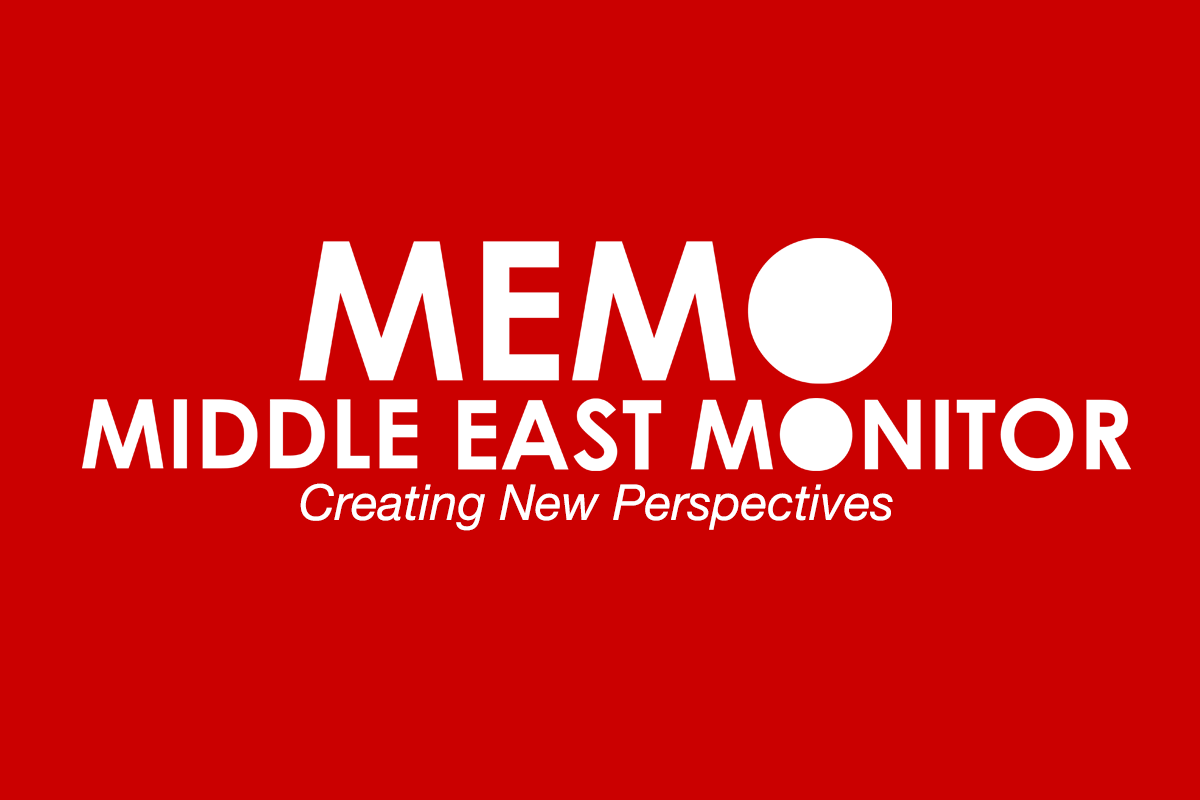
- Founded: 1 July 2009
- Location: London, United Kingdom
- Product: Translation and original analysis services
- Method: Media monitoring
- Website: middleeastmonitor.com

The Middle East Monitor (MEMO) is a not-for-profit press monitoring organisation and lobbying group that emerged in mid-2009. MEMO is largely focused on the Israeli–Palestinian conflict but writes about other issues in the Middle East, as well. MEMO is pro-Palestinian in orientation, and has been labelled by some commentators as pro-Islamist, pro-Muslim Brotherhood, and pro-Hamas.

MEMO is financed by the State of Qatar. Its director is Daud Abdullah, former Deputy Secretary General of the Muslim Council of Britain and the current director of the British Muslim Initiative.

== Events ==
In June 2011, MEMO organized a speaking tour for Raed Salah, leader of the northern branch of the Islamic Movement in Israel. Salah, who was banned from entering the UK by the home secretary, was held in custody pending deportation until April 2012, when an immigration tribunal ruled that the home secretary had been misled.

In 2011, MEMO co-organized an event with Amnesty International and Palestine Solidarity Campaign entitled "Complicity in oppression: Do the media aid Israel?" featuring Abdel Bari Atwan.

On 22 August 2015, MEMO organized an event entitled "Palestine & Latin America: Building solidarity for national rights", featuring allegedly antisemitic cartoonist Carlos Latuff and British Palestinian activist Azzam Tamimi. Jeremy Corbyn was scheduled to appear but pulled out.

In November 2017, MEMO organized an event entitled "Crisis in Saudi Arabia: War, Succession and the Future", a discussion of future succession in Saudi Arabia's monarchy, regional rivalries with Iran, and war in Yemen.

== Staff ==
The staff and contributors of MEMO include Daud Abdullah and Ibrahim Hewitt.

== Criticism ==
In 2011, John Ware of BBC News described MEMO as a pro-Hamas publication.

In 2015, Labour Party leadership candidate Liz Kendall said: "It seems deeply unwise for Jeremy [Corbyn] to appear on at [sic] a conference organised by MEMO, an organisation that the Community Security Trust has said is infamous for repeated negative conspiracy theories about Israel and Jewish people in public life." The Trust describes MEMO as an anti-Israel organisation that promotes conspiracy theories and myths about Jews, Zionists, money and power. It said that MEMO had "questioned the suitability of Matthew Gould for the post of UK ambassador to Israel simply because he was Jewish".

In 2016, Yiftah Curiel, an employee of the Israeli Ministry of Foreign Affairs and spokesman for Israel's embassy in London, wrote that some of the staff of MEMO as well as the similar Middle East Eye are also active in Interpal, which has been designated in Israel as a terror-supporting group, as well as being on the United States Treasury's list of specially-designated terrorist organisations. The site itself is sympathetic to Hamas, and the Hamas website and social media accounts post and share material from the Middle East Monitor.

The same year, Andrew Gilligan, a reporter for The Sunday Telegraph, described it as "a news site which promotes a strongly pro-[Muslim] Brotherhood and pro-Hamas view of the region," its director Daud Abdullah as "a leader of the Brotherhood-linked British Muslim Initiative, set up and run by the Brotherhood activist Anas al-Tikriti and two senior figures in Hamas," and its senior editor, Ibrahim Hewitt, as chairman of Interpal, which he said was also linked to Hamas and the Brotherhood. Gilligan noted its location at Crown House, which he described as a "hub" of the Muslim Brotherhood's European activities.

In 2026, OpenAI stated that Middle East Monitor had unknowingly published at least 21 AI-assisted articles from Iranian operatives, under 4 fake personas. The articles contained content critical of the 2026 Iran war. MEMO said that it would investigate and "take the appropriate action."

== Palestine Book Awards ==
Since 2012, MEMO sponsors and organizes the annual Palestine Book Awards. The award is intended for books in English on various Palestinian topics.

== See also ==
- Al-Monitor
- Middle East Eye
- The New Arab
- Washington Report on Middle East Affairs
