= John Griffith Williams =

Welsh judge (born 1944)

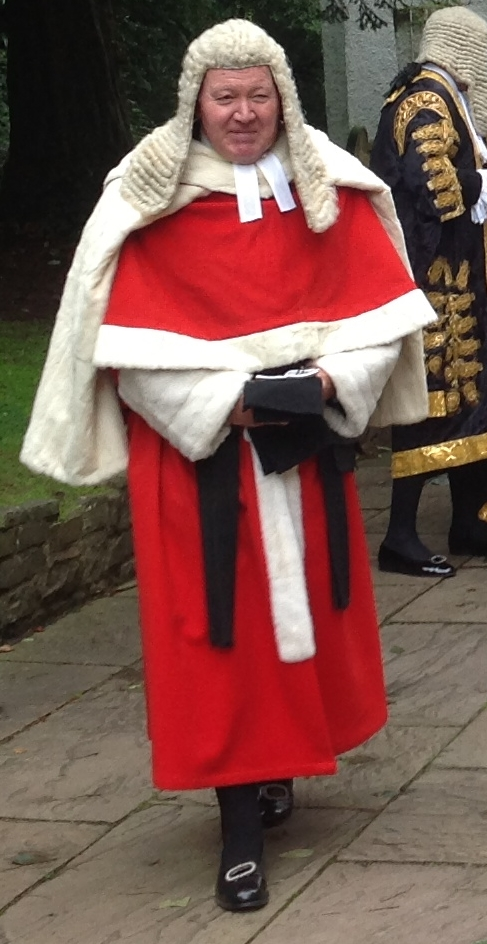
Griffith Williams in procession at Llandaff Cathedral in 2013

Sir John Griffith Williams (born 20 December 1944) is a Welsh retired judge of the High Court of England and Wales. He retired from the High Court (Queen's Bench Division) with effect from 21 December 2014.

== Military ==
Griffith Williams was a lieutenant in the Royal Welch Fusiliers as a member of Territorial Army (United Kingdom), joining in 1964 and becoming part of the Territorial and Army Volunteer Reserve when it was created in 1967. He left the Reserve in 1971.

== Legal career ==
Griffith Williams was called to the bar at Gray's Inn in 1968, was appointed Queen's Counsel in 1985 and elected a bencher in 1994. From 1984 to 2000, he served as a Recorder and as a deputy High Court judge from 1995. From 1990 to 1992, he was a member of the Bar Council. He was treasurer of the Wales and Chester Circuit from 1993 to 1995 and its leader from 1996 to 1998. Griffith Williams was assistant commissioner to the Parliamentary Boundary Commission for Wales from 1994 to 2000. He was appointed a circuit judge in 2000 and was a senior circuit judge and Recorder of Cardiff from 2001 to 2007. On 11 January 2007, Griffith Williams was appointed a Justice of the High Court, receiving the customary knighthood, and assigned to the Queen's Bench Division. He has been a presiding judge of the Wales Circuit since 2010.

=== April Jones murder trial ===
From 29 April 2013, Griffith Williams oversaw the trial of Mark Bridger, who had been accused of murdering April Jones. The trial lasted just over four weeks, before on 30 May, a jury at Mold Crown Court found Bridger guilty of abduction, murder and perverting the course of justice. Later that same day, Griffith Williams sentenced Bridger to life imprisonment with a whole life order, describing him as a "pathological and glib liar" and "a paedophile" in his sentencing remarks.

== Other positions ==
Since 1999, Griffith Williams has been Chancellor of the Diocese of Llandaff, having served as Deputy Chancellor from 1996 until 1990. He served as a fellow of the Woodard Corporation (Western Division) from 1994 to 2002. He was made an honorary fellow of the University of Cardiff in 2008.

== Notable cases ==
- John Cooper (serial killer)
- Robert Napper
- Murder of April Jones
- Murder of Sian O'Callaghan
- Murder of Becky Godden-Edwards
