= John Ware (TV journalist) =

British journalist, author, and investigative reporter

- Education: Hurstpierpoint College
- Occupations: Journalist; author; investigative reporter
- Years active: 1971–present
- Notable work: *Mengele: The Complete Story* (1986, co-author); *Panorama*
- Children: 5 (including Hannah Ware and Jessie Ware)
- Awards: RTS Television Journalist of the Year (2000); James Cameron Memorial Trust Award (2004)

John Ware is a British journalist, author, and investigative reporter.

He was a newspaper reporter from 1971 to 1977 and then changed to television journalism.

Across his career, Ware has written for a number of newspapers, including The Sun, The Sunday Telegraph, The Sunday Times, The Guardian, The Observer, the Daily Mail, The Times, the Daily Express, The Jewish Chronicle and magazines such as The Spectator and Standpoint. Ware was also a reporter on the BBC public affairs documentary programme Panorama from 1986.

== Early life ==
Ware was educated at Hurstpierpoint College, a boarding school for boys near the village of Hurstpierpoint in West Sussex. He did not go to university.

== Career ==
Between 1971 and 1974, Ware worked for the Droitwich Guardian, followed by the Worcester Evening News. In 1974, he joined The Sun newspaper, and was covering the Northern Ireland conflict. He moved to television in 1977, joining the ITV's World in Action, becoming a producer in 1981. He joined the BBC's Panorama programme in 1986 and presented other programmes including Rough Justice, Taking Liberties and Inside Story. Several of the cases profiled in Rough Justice were referred back to the Court of Appeal, and several resulted in overturned convictions.

He left the BBC in 2012, and works as a freelance reporter for the BBC and ITV.

=== Documentaries ===
Amongst his TV documentaries for ITV, the BBC and C4 are the following:

- 1978: "The Hunt for Dr Mengele" exposed the network in Argentina and Paraguay that protected the notorious Auschwitz war criminal Dr Josef Mengele, responsible for barbaric medical experiments in the Nazi death camp.
- 1983: "Colonel Rauff's Refuge" tracked down and confronted in Santiago, Chile, the Nazi SS Colonel Walter Rauff who was behind the use of mobile gas chambers deployed to murder Jews, the disabled and communists, regarded by the SS as enemies of the German State. 200,000 are reported to have been murdered in some 20 "Gassing Vans".
- 1984: "The Set Up" captured by covert filming two Scotland Yard Flying Squad officers in the act of setting up an armed robbery in order to catch a criminal who they'd been unable to prosecute. The programme evidence led to their trial at the Old Bailey.
- 1984: "The Spy Who Never Was" broadcast the first interview with MI5 former assistant Director General Peter Wright on Soviet penetration of the UK. Wright later wrote Spycatcher ghosted by Paul Greengrass which was banned by the Thatcher government.
- 1985: "A Conflict in Customs" exposed collusion with IRA gunrunners in the New York office of US Customs.
- 1987: "Brent Schools Hard Left Rules" documented the failure of radical new anti-racist policies to reverse years of underachievement by black pupils in the London borough of Brent.
- 1989: "The Pursuit of Power" disclosed evidence that led directly to the District Auditor and then the High Court to accuse Dame Shirley Porter of "gerrymandering", by attempting to rig the Westminster City Council's elections, leading to a surcharge on Porter of £27m. The case was described as "the single greatest act of electoral corruption in British political history".
- 1991: "Lethal Force" disclosed an attempt by paratroopers in Belfast to cover up the unlawful shooting of joyriders. The conviction for murder of the paratrooper, Lee Clegg, for this incident was ultimately quashed on appeal.
- 1992: "The Dirty War" exposed the role of British Military Intelligence rogue agent Brian Nelson in ten murders, and conspiracies to murder. The programme led to two further investigations by the former Metropolitan Police Commissioner Sir John Stevens into alleged collusion with Loyalist murder gangs by the intelligence services in the Northern Ireland conflict.
- 1996: "Death of a Principle" investigated Britain's close relationship with Saudi Arabia despite the regime's human rights abuses, including 200 public beheadings the previous year.
- 1997: "Down The Tube" disclosed papers belonging to the Deputy Prime Minister John Prescott showing that, despite elections promises to the contrary, the new Labour government planned to privatise the London Underground within two months of taking office.
- 1998: "A Nurse's Story" unearthed evidence showing that Deborah Parry, one of the two "Saudi Nurses", was innocent of the murder of Yvonne Gilford in 1996.
- 1998: "The Car Cartel" secured evidence of secret price fixing deals between car dealers and three leading motor manufacturers, including Volvo, which led to the Director General of Fair Trading John Bridgeman to accuse the Swedish car giant of "disgraceful" conduct, while pointing out that under the government's proposed new competition laws, the company could have been fined £70m.
- 1999: "The Blair Mayor Project" disclosed how, in contravention of New Labour's strict contest rules, the party's General Secretary (in 2000) and his senior officials were responsible for leaking a confidential list of London party members to Downing Street's London Mayoral candidate Frank Dobson, giving him an unfair advantage over rival candidate Ken Livingstone.
- 2000: "Who Bombed Omagh?" found and confronted three members of the dissident IRA cell that exploded a 500lbs car bomb in Omagh High Street killing 29 people and one unborn child four months after the Northern Ireland Good Friday Peace agreement. In 2009, in a landmark case, the Civil Court in Belfast held the men named by Panorama liable for the murders and imposed substantial fines. The victims' families took the men to court with a £1.2m funding campaign by the Daily Mail following Panorama.
- 2002: "A Licence To Murder" (two part series) exposed the role of special branch agent Ken Barrett, one of three members of the Loyalist murder gang who assassinated Belfast lawyer Pat Finucane in the kitchen of his home in front of his three children in 1989.
- 2003: "The Asylum Game" was a first-hand secretly filmed account from a Romanian woman posing as a Moldovan refugee about the ease with which she was able to make a bogus claim for asylum.
- 2004: "A Fight To The Death" investigated the BBC's fight with the Blair Government described by broadcaster Melvyn Bragg as "astonishingly bold", and criticised the BBC Director General Greg Dyke's role which led to trustees asking him to resign.
- 2005: "Iraq: Tony and the Truth" investigated what Prime Minister Tony Blair did not disclose before sending British troops into battle. It charted the evolution of Blair's Iraq policy, "what he said in public, what he knew in private and whether he can reconcile the two".
- 2005: "A Question of Leadership" was a critical look at the Muslim Council of Britain's failure to recognise the extent to which extremist views were held amongst some of its Islamist member organisations. The programme followed the 7/7 Tube bombings in London which killed 52.
- 2006: "Faith Hate and Charity" investigated the activities of the London-based Palestinian charity Interpal, and found that its funds "had helped build up Hamas into what it is today" by most of them being sent to Islamic (partner) charities in Gaza and the West Bank, a number of which promoted Hamas' ideology. The programme triggered one of the Charity Commission's longest and most complex statutory investigations which resulted in Interpal being served with a statutory notice to sever its close links with the Union of Good, a global coalition of 56 Islamic charities chaired by the spiritual leader of the worldwide Muslim Brotherhood Movement, Dr Yusuf Qaradawi who said: "We must plant the love of death and the love of martyrdom in the Islamic nation." Panorama reported that he has made no bones about the relationship between charity and politics, saying: "I don't like this word 'donations'. I like to call it Jihad with money, because God has ordered us to fight enemies with our lives and our money."
- 2008: "Omagh – What The Police Were Never Told" revealed that GCHQ had been monitoring the telephones of the dissident IRA bombers on the day they murdered 29 people by planting a 500lbs car bomb in Omagh – and withheld this intelligence from the CID investigating the bombers. Prime Minister Gordon Brown ordered an inquiry by the Intelligence Services Commissioner, whose highly redacted report was dismissed by MPs on the Northern Ireland Affairs Committee who said "far too many questions remain unanswered."
- 2010: "British Schools, Islamic Rules" investigated how some Muslim children were being exposed to extremist preachers and fundamentalist Islamic groups and how school inspectors missed the warning signs.
- 2013: "Britain's Secret Terror Force" disclosed the activities of the Military Reaction Force, an experimental undercover army, in 1971–72. The programme revealed how some MRF soldiers randomly opened fire on unarmed civilians killing and wounding them. The NI DPP ordered a criminal investigation.
- 2014: "The Mayor and Our Money" exposed how – despite claiming a commitment to the "highest standards of probity and transparency" – the autocratic Mayor of Tower Hamlets, Lutfur Rahman, had awarded £9m worth of grants to the London borough's thriving third sector behind closed doors, doubling the share recommended by council officers on the basis of need to Bangladeshi and Somali organisations who provided Rahman's core vote. Four days later, the Secretary of State sent in Commissioners to run the council and Rahman was later banned from office for five years, a court having found him to be corrupt and to have lied.
- 2018: "Who Speaks for British Muslims" disclosed (Channel 4, Dispatches) how Muslim advocacy group MEND, which claims to be committed to fostering social cohesion, worked with extremist speakers, "hounded their critics mercilessly", some of whose senior members expressed antisemitic views, and whose wealthy co-founder donated to CAGE, listed by the Home Office as extremist because it has campaigned on behalf of convicted terrorists and senior Jihadi ideologues.
- 2018: "Who Bombed Birmingham?": identified, tracked down and confronted (ITV's Exposure) one of the two men who planted bombs in two Birmingham pubs in 1975 that killed 21 people.
- 2019: "Is Labour Antisemitic?" a report into the growth of antisemitism within the Labour Party under Jeremy Corbyn, and how the leadership was addressing the problem.
- 2019: "When Boris Met Jennifer" an investigation (ITV's Exposure) into what the commentary said was the "Prime Minister's conduct as a public servant - and his tenuous relationship with the truth" by reference to his denials that he had helped the business affairs of his young lover, the American entrepreneur Jennifer Arcuri, when he was London Mayor.
- 2021: "Princess Diana Martin Bashir and the BBC" an investigation (independent of the official investigation by Lord Dyson commissioned by the BBNC'#s Director General) into the deception former Panorama reporter Martin Bashir had used to secure his world scoop interview with Diana, Princess of Wales.

A number of Ware's programmes have attracted trenchant criticism:

Asylum seekers

The then Home Secretary, David Blunkett described "The Asylum Game" (2003) as a "poorly researched and overspun documentary" which uncritically repeated the claims of MigrationWatch UK, an organisation campaigning for tightening restrictions on immigration to the UK. Ware denied this in a response to Blunkett's comments. Save for The Guardian, however, the programme was reviewed positively by the rest of the mainstream media, with Blunkett's criticism described as "intemperate" in The Sunday Times.

==== Islamism ====
- The Muslim Council of Britain, described his 2005 Panorama episode "A Question of Leadership" as "deeply unfair" and "a witch hunt". The programme attracted over 600 complaints within a week of its broadcast: Guardian journalist Madeleine Bunting described Ware's claims in the documentary as "veer(ing) erratically from the McCarthyite absurd to some legitimate accusations". The Observer, however said that the programmes "central claims [...] remain unchallenged: that the moderate credentials of the leaders of Britain's most powerful Muslim lobby group are open to question; that the MCB grew out of sectarian Islamist politics of south Asia and that it fails to control its extremist affiliates." The Evening Standard referred to Ware's "dispassionate intelligence" and that the programme had "confirmed his status as the most important journalist in British current-affairs television today". The BBC rejected all of the MCB's complaints and published its detailed response.
- Responding to Panorama episode, "Faith, Hate and Charity", The Muslim Council of Britain described Ware as "an agenda-driven pro-Israel polemicist". Interpal claimed it had been "vindicated" by the Charity Commission, but the latter said: "Our report does not give the charity a clean bill of health." There are four main findings by the Commission arising from Panorama's investigation, of which three go against Interpal, while on the fourth the Commission admits it is effectively unable to regulate. The then-Labour MP Phyllis Starkey told the Islam Channel that Ware had approached the programme with a "pre-set" agenda and accused him of "deliberate" misrepresentation" by not explaining that Hamas had "won power through a democratic election." Starkey apologised for "impugning" Ware's "integrity, after he pointed out that he had referred three times to Hamas's election victory.
- The MCB also criticised "British schools, Islamic Rules" (2010) as a partial and unbalanced portrayal 2010.

==== Labour Party ====
Ware has reported two Panorama documentaries on the Labour Party in recent years: on Jeremy Corbyn's campaign to be elected as Labour Party leader and in 2019 Ware reported on allegations of antisemitism in the Labour Party in an extended Panorama programme entitled "Is Labour Anti-Semitic?"

The 2015 programme "Jeremy Corbyn: Labour's Earthquake" attracted hundreds of complaints, including from Corbyn's campaign team, and was described by a member of Corbyn's campaign team as "containing factual inaccuracies" and "a complete hatchet job". The BBC rejected the claims.

The 2019 programme "Is Labour Anti-Semitic?" was nominated for two British Journalism Awards in the 'Investigation' and 'Politics Journalism' categories. The Labour Party, then led by Jeremy Corbyn, strongly condemned the programme, stating that it contained "deliberate and malicious representations designed to mislead". The party stated that "Panorama has pre-determined the outcome of its investigation and is relying on unsubstantiated allegations and misrepresentation to come to its conclusions". Labour submitted a formal complaint about the programme to the BBC, but this was rejected by the BBC's Executive Complaints Unit. Over 20 complaints of bias were taken to Ofcom, who ruled that the programme had been "duly impartial" and had given appropriate weight to Labour's position.

Five of the Labour Party whistleblowers interviewed in the programme announced their intention to sue the party, claiming that Labour's response breached its commitment to protect the rights of whistleblowers and defamed them. Ware also launched legal action against the Labour Party, alleging it had libelled him in statements following the broadcast of the programme. On 22 July 2020, the Keir Starmer-led Labour Party retracted a number of allegations that it had made in relation to both John Ware and a number of participants in the Panorama documentary in full. The party issued a formal apology, and agreed to pay substantial damages and costs.

In a statement, the BBC said it "welcomed" the "long overdue apology to John Ware and the seven Panorama whistle-blowers who have been subjected to painful and damaging attacks on their integrity and character" adding "John Ware is a reporter with an extraordinary record of excellence at Panorama for investigative journalism in the public interest."

Jeremy Corbyn and some Labour Party members stood by the original accusations. In 2020, Ware commenced legal proceedings against Naomi Wimborne-Idrissi and Richard Kuper of Jewish Voice for Labour for making false allegations about his journalistic career and the programme.

In September 2022, they agreed to issue a full public apology and in a settlement are reported to have paid £200,000 in costs and damages. Ware also won a libel case against Paddy French, editor of Press Gang and Rebecca Television.

In 2022, an Al Jazeera documentary called The Labour Files depicted the Panorama episode as highly misleading and showed it had spliced together different parts of a whistleblower's statement, falsely rendering it as accusing Labour members of praising Hitler "every day" in her presence. In December 2022, the BBC published a clarification stating that if the episode were to be re-broadcast, the whistlerblower's "additional comments" would be shown. In a public letter to The Guardian, Ware and Panorama Executive producer Neil Grant admitted this clip was mishandled, though still defending the overall merit of the episode. Labour Files producer Richard Sanders commented in his own letter to The Guardian that it "was always extremely improbable" that Labour members would have praised Hitler, citing approvingly Peter Oborne's comment in the Al Jazeera episode that by "the summer of 2019… you could say whatever you liked about Jeremy Corbyn's Labour party", to explain the BBC's editorial attitude. Sanders additionally slammed the BBC's clarification as obviously disingenuous.

The Forde Report, commissioned under Starmer's leadership and released in 2022, also came to the conclusion that the presentation Panorama made of the Labour antisemitism controversy was "entirely misleading." The report's author, Martin Forde KC, received a request from the BBC and Ware to amend the report's approach to the Panorama episode, with Forde describing an email Ware sent him as "quite aggressive in tone", but ultimately deciding against any such changes.

=== Media awards ===
- International Film and Television Festival of New York (1979)
- Royal Television Society Current Affairs Home Award (1983, 1987, 2000, 2002, 2013)
- RTS Television Journalist of The Year (2000) for "Who Bombed Omagh?" and "Spin Doctors", an investigation into the truthfulness of government claims about National Health Service spending and new initiatives.
- Broadcast Press Guild Television Award Best Single Documentary (2001)
- Amnesty International UK Media Award TV Documentaries (2003)
- James Cameron Memorial Trust (2004) "for work as a journalist that combined moral vision and professional integrity"
- British Academy of Film and Television Arts (BAFTA) Nominations (2000, 2002, 2008, 2013, 2019)
- The Association for International Broadcasting of International - Investigative Journalism award (2014) for "Britain's Secret Terror Force"
- Commitment to Media Award from the Women's International Zionist Organization – 2015. Ware was commended for being "sympathetic to Jewish concerns". Stephen Pollard, editor of The Jewish Chronicle, said: "I tell our trainees at the JC, that if there is one person they should model themselves on, it is John Ware."

=== Other activities ===
Ware is co-author, with Gerald Posner, of Mengele: The Complete Story, 1986.

In 2012, Ware took voluntary redundancy from the BBC, but has continued with some freelance work. Since leaving the BBC, he has published articles about its top management.

In April 2020, he was part of a consortium which bought The Jewish Chronicle after it went into liquidation. In 2024, following a scandal over apparent fabrications published by the Chronicle, Ware told The Times that he did not know who funded the paper's purchase: "I, and some others, repeatedly asked to be told who the new funders were. We were told that wouldn't be possible. I was assured that they were politically mainstream and I trusted those assurances because I trusted who gave them. I didn't want the paper to fold so I allowed my name to be used, having been told it would help. I had zero managerial, financial or editorial influence, control or input, nor ever have had. It was just a name." Ware stopped writing for the Chronicle in February 2024 and defected to the Jewish News, due to concerns over the Chronicle's editorial trajectory under its new editor, Wallis Simons.

In September 2023, Ware released a TV documentary titled The Dark Side of Roger Waters, made in collaboration with the Campaign Against Antisemitism, in which he investigates accusations against the musician Roger Waters of antisemitic behaviour.

== Personal life ==
Ware was married to Helena (née Keele), and had three children with her – the actress Hannah Ware, singer-songwriter Jessie Ware and doctor Alex, all of whom were raised in the Jewish faith. Ware now lives in north-west London with his wife, the television producer Wendy Robbins, who is also Jewish, and their three children.
