= Jamaiat Al-Wafa LiRayat Al-Musenin =

Gaza city-based charitable organization

Jamaiat Al-Wafa LiRayat Al-Musenin (Arabic: جمعية الوفاء لرعاية المسنين, romanized: Jamʻīyat al-Wafāʼ li-Riʻāyat al-musinnīn) is a charity which has been proscribed by the Israeli government for connections to Hamas. Islamic Relief challenged the designation, suggesting Israeli analysts have confused the charity with the al Wafa hospital, in Gaza, which has been supported by both the United States and United Kingdom.

The charity is based in Gaza City. Translated into English its name is the "Loyalty Society To Care For The Aged."

== See also ==
- List of charities accused of ties to terrorism
