= Macur Review =

The Macur Review was an independent review established by the British government in 2012 to review the Waterhouse inquiry.

Its remit was set as follows:

“To review the scope of the Waterhouse Inquiry, and whether any specific allegations of child abuse falling within the terms of reference were not investigated by the Inquiry, and to make recommendations to the Secretary of State for Justice and the Secretary of State for Wales."

It was chaired by Lady Justice Macur DBE. The review was reported in March 2016, but found no evidence of significant failings in the previous inquiry. The Macur Review's last of six recommendations advised caution in re-opening previous inquiries.
