= Muslim Aid =

British Islamic charity

- Formation: 30 November 1985
- Type: NGO
- Legal status: Charity
- Purpose: Healthcare, education, Disaster & Emergency, Shelter & Construction, Economic empowerment, Child sponsorship, Income generation, UK development
- Headquarters: London
- Location: Great Britain
- Key people: Raihan Alfaradhi, Chair of the Board of Trustees; Tim Holmes, Interim CEO.
- Budget: (2022)
- Revenue: £20.8 million (2022)
- Website: muslimaid.org

Muslim Aid is a British faith-based international humanitarian charity headquartered in London. Founded in 1985, it provides emergency assistance and supports longer-term programmes focused on healthcare, education, clean water and livelihoods.

In 2017, its funds and property were transferred to a newly registered charitable incorporated organisation, which became the successor to the former charity. The current organisation is registered with the Charity Commission for England and Wales under charity number 1176462.

== History and beginnings ==
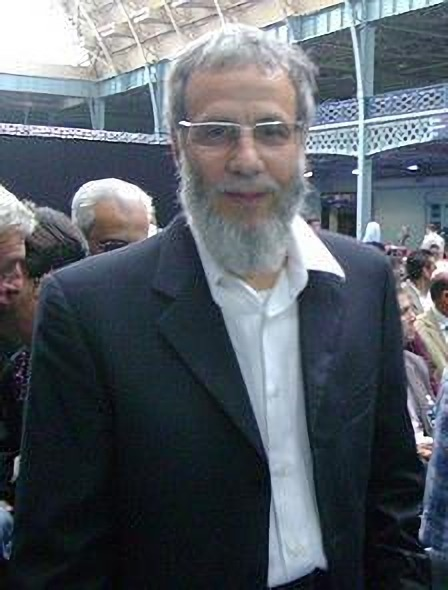
Yusuf Islam / Cat Stevens (pictured in 2008) was the original chairman of Muslim Aid from its inception in 1985 until 1993

Founding and early development

Muslim Aid was founded in 1985, in response to the 1983–85 famine in Ethiopia, by 23 organisations based in Britain. It was initially led by a committee including Cat Stevens and members from the Muslim Council of Britain. Stevens served as chairman until his resignation in 1996. Suhaib Hasan became the next chairman. Mahmood al-Hassan became executive director in 1993. From 1995, Iqbal Sacranie was a trustee.

The organisation initially focused on raising funds and providing emergency assistance to communities affected by famine, conflict and natural disasters.

Muslim Aid subsequently expanded from emergency relief into longer-term humanitarian and development programmes. Its work has included healthcare, education, water provision, skills training and income-generation projects, as well as responses to conflicts and natural disasters.

Governance intervention

The organisation became subject to regulatory intervention by the Charity Commission for England and Wales in 2010, when its trustees were given advice and recommendations concerning its international activities and due-diligence arrangements. Further concerns identified in 2012 led the Commission to open a statutory inquiry into the former charity in November 2013. After the trustees did not comply with an order directing them to improve the charity's governance, the Commission appointed an interim manager in 2016.

Following a recommendation by the interim manager, Muslim Aid was converted into a charitable incorporated organisation in December 2017. The current organisation was entered on the register of charities on 29 December 2017, with a new board whose members had not served as trustees of the former charity. In February 2018, the former charity transferred its funds and property to the new organisation and was subsequently removed from the register. The current charitable incorporated organisation is the successor to the former charity.

The Charity Commission continued to monitor the organisation's governance under an action plan issued in 2018. In 2020, the regulator opened a further statutory inquiry after concluding that the trustees had not fully completed the required actions by the deadline, although it acknowledged that progress had been made. The inquiry examined the charity's governance, financial controls, management of overseas operations and reporting of serious incidents. The Commission closed the inquiry in November 2022 after the trustees completed a subsequent action plan.

== Countries of operation ==
Muslim Aid has field offices and partners in over 13 countries including; Bangladesh, Bosnia, Pakistan, Somalia, Sri Lanka, Sudan and Myanmar. Muslim Aid has also registered and has functioning offices in Sweden and the USA. The Head Office is based in Whitechapel, London. The Muslim Aid aid delivery footprint extends over 70 countries and is one of the largest of any International Non-Governmental Organization.

Over the years, Muslim Aid has developed a "world-wide network" of international partners—both corporations and humanitarian organisations—including British retail chain ASDA, the Islamic Bank of Britain, the Qatar-based Al Asmakh Charity, and the US-based United Methodist Committee on Relief. In 2014, Muslim Aid was part of an international, interfaith coalition of aid organisations that traveled to the Central African Republic to assess and raise awareness of the growing humanitarian crisis' in that country.

Muslim Aid has grown from a small organisation to one of largest Muslim NGOs in the world. Originally working to alleviate suffering during the humanitarian crises which plagued Africa through emergency relief, Muslim Aid expanded its work to encompass long-term humanitarian assistance through economic empowerment, education, child sponsorship, water and sanitation, shelter and disaster risk reduction.

== Recent work ==
Muslim Aid has carried out its work in many areas of the world. It operated in Indonesia following the 2004 Indian Ocean earthquake (tsunami) and then the two earthquakes in Java (one in May 2006 and the other in July of that year). It also worked in Bosnia following the Yugoslav wars of the 1990s. It worked in Pakistan following the 2005 Kashmir earthquake, to build seismically resistant sustainable housing in conjunction with UK architectural charity Article 25. It has continuously worked in the Palestinian territories, Darfur, Eritrea, Afghanistan, Lebanon and Bangladesh. It also worked in China following the 2008 Sichuan earthquake.

Since 2011, Muslim Aid has worked inside Syria, as well as in neighbouring countries through its field offices and partners, to deliver essential aid to those affected by the conflict in Syria. To date, food items, clothing, hygiene kits, medical aid and non-food items have been distributed. Education projects and long-term support of a hospital inside Syria commenced in 2016.

In 2016, Muslim Aid, in partnership with WFP, was the first NGO to reach Shirqat, Iraq, for over two years with essential food aid.

East London Mosque and Muslim Aid donated 10 tonnes of food to homeless people in December 2016.

Faith groups including Muslim Aid worked together to care for street sleepers and other vulnerable people in the run-up to Christmas in 2016 across the English capital of London are expanding their efforts by providing meals and shelter packs to rough sleepers. Their aim is to make sure those most in need are protected from cold weather and hunger during the holidays when many shops and services are closed or operating at reduced capacity.

Following the Grenfell Tower fire in 2017, Muslim Aid, in association with Islamic Relief mobilised to provide aid, collecting over 60 tonnes of supplies and raising more than £73,000 for the affected residents.

Khalid Javid was appointed chief executive in 2023, with a vision to renew Muslim Aid's UK Operations. Javid's recent focus has been on tackling the UK's cost-of-living crisis, notably overseeing Muslim Aid deliver over 30,000 meals in Tower Hamlets during 2023's Ramadan Campaign. As CEO, his vision includes intensified efforts to help UK beneficiaries, which has recently seen a growing need, as well as expanding Muslim Aid’s international programmes.

== 25th anniversary ==
In 2010 Muslim Aid celebrated 25 years since it began its work. The year was marked with events and initiatives to highlight its achievements and plot its future course.

In a message the Prince of Wales said:

"I have followed your progress with close interest and attention over the last quarter of a century and have admired the projects and programmes you have undertaken in more than 70 countries around the world, ranging from emergency and disaster relief to education, health and micro-finance projects. If I may say so, our country is incredibly fortunate to be able to count on organisations like Muslim Aid who bring not only help, but hope to those most in need."

Prime Minister Gordon Brown said:

"For a quarter of a century the valuable work Muslim Aid has been doing means that millions of people across the world are today safer and healthier. I wish Muslim Aid and its passionate and committed staff and supporters the very best for another 25 years of achievement."

== Controversies ==
Controversy surrounding Muslim Aid has centered mainly on allegations of its role in the financing of terrorist or extremist organizations. In 2002, a Spanish police report alleged the organisation to have used funds to send mujahadeen fighters to Bosnia. In 2010, the organisation was investigated by the Charity Commission for England and Wales for allegedly funding groups linked to a banned terrorist organisation. The investigation cleared the organisation and said that the claims were unsubstantiated. The Sunday Telegraph criticised the outcome saying the Commission cleared the organization, "without examining any of the evidence presented," though the organisation has admitted funding two organisations linked to Hamas and the Palestinian Islamic Jihad, and alleging that Muslim Aid is "closely linked to the extremist Islamic Forum of Europe, which wants to create a sharia state in Europe."

In 2003, ABC News established a link between a Muslim Aid Australia and the Dewan Dakwah Islamiyah Indonesia (DDII) which is linked to the Islamist group Jemaah Islamiyah. In 2008, their offices in Lakemba were raided by the police over allegations that funds were being sent through Interpal to help get money into Gaza during Israeli border closures.

In 2008, the organisation was banned in Israel, due to its alleged ties to the Union of Good. A 2009 report by the US-based think-tank Nine Eleven Finding Answers Foundation, also alleged the charity was part of the Union of Good. Anthony Cordesman of the Center for Strategic and International Studies also said they funded Hamas.

In 2009, despite being dogged by allegations of foreign intelligence links and terrorist support throughout the Muslim world, Muslim Aid Pakistan, with full support of Muslim Aid UK figures appointed a former director of the Inter-Services Intelligence (ISI), Khaled Latif Mughal as its country chairman. Mughal was responsible for the Afghan and Kashmir areas of Pakistan's primary intelligence agency during the 1990s. After the Mumbai terrorist attacks of 2008, Mughal claimed the terrorist acts were a conspiracy by the United States, Israel and India to cripple Pakistan and steal its nuclear arsenal.

In April 2013, three men were convicted of planning terrorist attacks in UK. They raised funds by criminally posing as Muslim Aid workers; the matter was pursued by the police and prosecutions were made. A small amount of funds was recovered and passed onto the charity.

On 2 May 2013, an international arrest warrant was issued for its long time trustee Chowdhury Mueen-Uddin for war crimes. He was subsequently found guilty in absentia of murdering 18 Bangladesh intellectuals as a leader within Al-Badr, a far-right pro-Pakistan Islamist paramilitary force in the Bangladesh liberation war.

The government of Bangladesh investigated the organisation for allegedly funding militants in the country. In December 2013, Mozammel Hossain, the head of the Rangpur branch of Muslim Aid, was arrested for financing "subversive activities". In April 2014, Bangladeshi politician Sayed Ashraful Islam of the Awami League Central Working Committee warned funds from the organisation were being used to spread "religious fanaticism". Again in September 2014, Major general Abdur Rashid said they funded extremism.

In 2014, the Charity Commission for England and Wales announced it was part of a "statutory inquiry". According to the charity, the investigation was caused after they reported "non-compliance with some operational aspects in two field offices". The Statutory Inquiry report was published in November 2022 https://www.gov.uk/government/publications/charity-inquiry-muslim-aid. The Commission concluded that the trustees had failed to fully comply with the 2018 Action Plan by the required two-year deadline, but acknowledged the significant progress made by the charity and its trustees to fully comply with the 2018 Action Plan. It concluded that the trustees co-operated, as they were expected to, in providing information and updates as required. A subsequent enquiry was opened in 2020 in order to escalate the Commission’s engagement with the trustees to ensure full compliance with the 2018 Action Plan to achieve the necessary changes and improvements to the charity’s governance and administration. The 2020 inquiry’s purpose was secured with the trustees’ completion of the 2022 Action Plan, following which the inquiry was closed in November 2022.

In 2017, the government of Bangladesh barred the organisation from aiding the Rohingya people in Cox's Bazar, alleging funds were used to preach Islam, construct mosques, encourage radicalism, and fund militants.

== Responses to controversy ==
In response to the allegations made against Muslim Aid, the Charity Commission, examined alleged ties with terrorist groups, as well as alleged payments made to groups linked with Hamas. Its investigations lasted six months (from March to September 2010), and "found no evidence of irregular or improper use of the charity's funds or any evidence that the charity had illegally funded any proscribed or designated entities". The report further concluded that the Charity Commission report "has given a public assurance that public allegations of links between [Muslim Aid] and terrorism are unsubstantiated".

In 2016, Jehangir Malik, who has previously held the top role at Islamic Relief, was appointed chief executive of Muslim Aid. He had been at Islamic Relief for 23 years, starting as a volunteer and working up to national fundraising director, before spending his last six years at the charity as its UK director. Michael King, the interim manager of Muslim Aid, said: "This is an important international NGO, rooted in the faith of the Muslim Community and carrying out work in over 70 countries across the world. My principal task is to ensure that it will be a beacon of good governance in line with good practice, so enabling it to expand its vital relief work throughout the world".

== Awards and nominations ==
In 2013, Muslim Aid won International Charity award at the Charity Times Awards. The Charity was also nominated for the Charity of the Year award.

In January 2014, Muslim Aid was nominated for the Charity of the Year award at the British Muslim Awards.
