= North Wales child abuse scandal =

Child abuse scandal

The North Wales child abuse scandal was the subject of a three-year, £13 million investigation into the physical and sexual abuse of children in care homes in the counties of Clwyd and Gwynedd, in North Wales, including the Bryn Estyn children's home at Wrexham, between 1974 and 1990. The report into the scandal, headed by retired High Court judge Sir Ronald Waterhouse QC, which was published in 2000, resulted in changes in policy in England and Wales into how authorities deal with children in care, and to the settling of 140 compensation claims on behalf of victims of child abuse.

In November 2012, new allegations led to the Prime Minister, David Cameron, announcing that a senior independent figure, later named as Mrs Justice Julia Macur, would examine the conduct and remit of the Waterhouse Inquiry. In addition, the Home Secretary, Theresa May, announced a new police inquiry into how the original allegations were dealt with, as well as an investigation of any new allegations. The broadcasting of false allegations on Newsnight on 2 November led to the resignation of the Director-General of the BBC, George Entwistle, eight days later.

The report of phase one of the police investigation, Operation Pallial, was published on 29 April 2013. It set out a total of 140 allegations of abuse at 18 children's homes in North Wales between 1963 and 1992. The police stated in November 2013 that, in the previous year, over 200 people had come forward to assist their enquiries.

In November 2014, the owner of several children's residential homes in the Wrexham area, John Allen, was convicted at Mold Crown Court on 33 counts of sexual abuse against 19 boys and one girl, aged between 7 and 15, during the 1960s and 1970s, and was sentenced to life imprisonment.

The Macur review report was published in March 2016.

== Background ==
In common with local government practice at the time, the two major councils in North Wales – Clwyd and Gwynedd – had a series of council-owned alongside privately owned and operated children's homes. These provided residential care for children in line with the guidelines provided by both the Welsh Office and the British government. Homes and facilities in the region included:

- Clwyd
  - Council owned: Bryn Estyn; Cartrefle; Little Acton Assessment Centre; Bersham Hall; Chevet Hey; Park House; Upper Downing; South Meadow; Ysgol Talfryn
  - Privately owned: Bryn Alyn; Ystrad Hall School; Clwyd Hall School; Gatewen Hall; Tanllwyfan
- Gwynedd
  - Council owned: Queens Park ; Ty'r Felin; Ty Newydd; Cartref Bontnewydd
  - Privately owned: Do'l Rhyd School and Ysgol Hengwrt
- National Health Service facilities: Gwynfa Residential Unit (psychiatric hospital for children)

== Initial reports of abuse ==
From 1974 to 1990, a series of incidents of child abuse occurred within the North Wales children's homes. Initial reports which did not appear in public included:

- 1979: Internal investigation of reports (against Gary Cooke and Graham Stephens) in 1979
- September 1986: Residents of Ysgol Hengwrt, to the council. These reports eventually were brought to the Welsh Office's attention.
- 1988: The then Spastics Society against the care regime of Hengwrt Hall, to the council

== Alison Taylor: allegations, dismissal and publication ==
In the mid-1980s Alison Taylor, a residential care worker and then manager of a children's home in Gwynedd, began hearing stories from children coming to her home from across Clwyd and Gwynedd about a series of child sexual and abuse incidents in various care homes. On investigation, she found that several reports of these incidents had been made by both care and social workers, but that no procedural or disciplinary action had so far been taken as a result.

Creating a file around cases involving six children, Taylor made a series of allegations against senior social care professionals working for the authority which she raised with her superiors at the council, but again no action was taken. Taylor then reported her allegations to North Wales Police in 1986. The council suspended Taylor in January 1987, alleging that there had been a "breakdown in communications" between Taylor and her colleagues.

On two subsequent occasions, the council offered Taylor a financial termination agreement, subject to her signing a confidentiality agreement. After refusing to sign the confidentiality agreement, Taylor was dismissed. With the help of her trade union, Taylor took the council to an industrial tribunal, which was quickly closed after the parties came to an out of court financial settlement. In September 1989, Taylor accepted the agreement, which did not include an associated confidentiality agreement.

At the later Inquiry, Sir Ronald Waterhouse publicly vindicated Taylor. He stated that without Taylor's campaigning, there would have been no inquiry. Taylor was awarded a Pride of Britain award in 2000, and since 1996 has worked as a novelist.

== Initial public investigations ==
After agreement had been reached with the council, Taylor went to the local, Welsh and UK national media with her allegations. In these reports, Taylor made further allegations about Bryn Estyn care home in Wrexham, which had been run until its closure in 1984 by Clwyd County Council.

In 1990, an investigation was undertaken by Detective Inspector Donald Cronin of North Wales Police into allegations of sexual abuse at Cartrefle. Later reports found that Cronin undertook a thorough investigation to the best of his abilities, but that the investigation was restricted by a lack of co-operation by Children's Services and Social Services. Cronin's report, which found insufficient evidence to undertake a successful prosecution, was subsequently submitted to the council and became known as the Cartrefle Report.

Taylor continued her media campaign, discovering that more than ten reports of child abuse had been made to both councils before she had raised her concerns. Approached by other former and current residents and care workers with additional allegations, in 1991 Taylor compiled a dossier of allegations from over 100 young people, from which she took evidence from 75 cases which she submitted to North Wales Police, and copied to the council and Welsh Office. Only the police took any action, but were again not given co-operation by the council's social services team.

Wider UK concerns about children in residential care led to the commissioning of 10 public enquiries between 1990 and 1996, including the Utting Report (1991) and the Warner Report (1992), which exposed large-scale institutional abuse of children and young people. As a result, prompted by the Welsh Office and with the support of local politicians, the newly appointed Director of Social Services in Clwyd found several instances of previous allegations uncovered by previous council investigations, which had either not been properly investigated or where reports calling for action had been ignored.

The wider matter of child sexual abuse was then referred jointly by both councils to North Wales Police who undertook an inquiry in 1993, taking some 2,600 witness statements, and 300 cases were subsequently sent to the Crown Prosecution Service. As a result, seven people were prosecuted and convicted. Six residential social workers were prosecuted for abuse, three of whom had worked at Bryn Estyn. The former deputy head of Bryn Estyn, Peter Howarth, was jailed for 10 years in 1994 for sexually abusing teenage boys; he died in 1997.

== Jillings Report ==
There were then allegations that members of the police force had themselves colluded in covering up allegations. In March 1994 Clwyd County Council commissioned a further inquiry, the Jillings Report, undertaken by a panel headed by John Jillings, a former director of social services with Derbyshire County Council. The panel of Jillings, Professor Jane Tunstall and Gerrilyn Smith met with considerable opposition:

- The then newly appointed North Wales chief constable refused to meet them or help with access to the police major-incident database. This resulted in the need to collect 70 duplicate and additional witness statements, obtained by local councillors and MPs, who included Ann Clwyd the MP for Cynon Valley since 1984.
- 130 boxes of material handed over by the council to the police were not made available to the panel.
- The council did not allow the inquiry to place a notice in the local press seeking information. "This was considered to be unacceptable to the insurers", says the final report.

The Jillings Report stated that allegations involving famous names and paedophile rings were beyond its remit, and something best addressed at a potential later public inquiry. It found a child care system in which physical and sexual violence were common, from beatings and bullying, to indecent assault and rape. Children who complained of abuse were not believed, or were punished for making false allegations. The report stated that the number of children who were abused is not clear, but estimates range up to 200; in the early 1990s, around 150 had sought compensation. At least 12 former residents were found to have died from unnatural causes. The report states that some staff linked to abuse may have been allowed to resign or retire early. The report concludes that its panel members had considered quitting before publication, due to: "...the considerable constraints placed upon us." The final report's appendices included limited copies of the key witness statements taken by North Wales Police during their earlier investigation.

The final report was not published because of concerns over libel, and legal advice and concerns from the council's insurers, Municipal Mutual Insurance, which warned that the report would encourage court cases and compensation claims. The report also states that Municipal Mutual suggested that the then chair of the council's social services committee, Malcolm King, be sacked if he spoke out. In November 2012, King commented:

Because it was suppressed, the lessons of the Jillings report were not learned. It was the exchange of financial safety for the safety of real people. It was one of the most shameful parts of recent history.

It was assumed until November 2012 that all publicly held copies of the Jillings Report had been destroyed, and hence it could not be published. In light of the re-emergence of the scandal that month, one of the few legally held remaining copies was sent to the Children's Commissioner for Wales, Keith Towler.

In November 2012, Anne Clwyd MP called for the legal archive copy of the report to be published, claiming that she was shown a copy in 1994: "I would say please get the Jillings report published because it shows... rape, bestiality, violent assaults and torture, and the effects on those young boys at that time cannot be under-estimated." BBC Wales subsequently spoke to Jillings about Ms Clwyd's claim of bestiality, but Jillings said his report did not unearth any such claims. Jillings also commented that public figures were not among names given by victims, and that: "The people the investigation focussed on, because these were the people that the children spoke to us about, were staff members." Jillings commented to other media:

What we found was horrific and on a significant scale. If the events in children's homes in North Wales were to be translated into a film, Oliver Twist would seem relatively benign. The scale of what happened, and how it was allowed, are a disgrace, and stain on the history of child care in this country.

In November 2012 Flintshire County Council uncovered a copy of the Jillings Report in their archive. The six north Wales councils took legal advice about whether it could be made available under Freedom of Information legislation.

A redacted version of the report was finally published in July 2013, after a request by the BBC under the Freedom of Information Act. It said that: "Our investigations have led us to conclude that the abuse of children and young people in Clwyd residential units has been extensive, and has taken place over a substantial number of years.... It is clear that, in a significant number of cases, the lives of young people who have been through the care system in Clwyd have been severely disrupted and disturbed." It severely criticised North Wales Police, and stated that "the most striking fact to emerge is that five men who shared in common their employment as residential care workers at Bryn Estyn were convicted of serious offences involving at least 24 young people."

In June 2013, a redacted copy of the Jillings report was reportedly put up for auction on internet auction site eBay. After Wrexham Council threatened legal action, the item was removed from sale.

== The Waterhouse Inquiry ==
In 1996, the then Secretary of State for Wales, William Hague, ordered a Tribunal of Inquiry into allegations of hundreds of cases of child abuse in care homes in former county council areas of Clwyd and Gwynedd between 1974 and 1990. Sir Ronald Waterhouse QC, a retired High Court judge, was appointed to head the inquiry.

The inquiry began in January 1997. The tribunal sat for 203 days, and heard evidence directly from 250 witnesses, attracted 200 additional personal statements, and in total heard from more than 650 people. Of the 260 witnesses that the inquiry, nearly half subsequently needed counselling for psychiatric help after giving evidence, paid for by the inquiry. The inquiry finished taking evidence in May 1998, with Waterhouse expecting to submit his report to the Welsh Secretary within 6 to 8 months. However, the volume of evidence taken and the serious of allegations within, led to a 12-month delay in publication of the report to the Welsh Secretary until October 1999. The final report ran to over 500,000 words, and contained 700 allegations of abuse involving 170 individuals. More than 80 people, many of whom were care staff or teachers, were named as child abusers in statements to the inquiry. Costing more than £12 million, it was said to be: "the biggest investigation ever held in Britain into allegations of physical, sexual and emotional abuse of children who passed through the care system."

The findings were published in February 2000, as Lost In Care – The Waterhouse Report. The report concluded that there was: "Widespread sexual abuse of boys occurred in children's residential establishments in Clwyd between 1974 and 1990. There were some incidents of sexual abuse of girl residents in these establishments but they were comparatively rare." As well as physical abuse and the unacceptable use of force, there was "widespread sexual abuse, including buggery." The public version of the report named and criticised almost 200 people, either for abuse to children or failure to offer sufficient protection. Although it identified 28 alleged perpetrators, many names were redacted due to either pending prosecutions or lack of evidence. The report stated:

The evidence before us has disclosed that for many children who were consigned to Bryn Estyn, in the 10 or so years of its existence as a community home, it was a form of purgatory or worse from which they emerged more damaged than when they had entered and for whom the future had become even more bleak.

The report found no evidence "to establish that there was a wide-ranging conspiracy involving prominent persons and others with the objective of sexual activity with children in care", but recognised the existence of a paedophile ring in the Wrexham and Chester area.

=== The Bryn Alyn Community ===
Of particular concern was the activities of the Bryn Alyn Community Group of homes which "stood out because of the large volume of complaints covering almost the whole period of our review." The report said that complaints and evidence of abuse in children's homes run by the Bryn Alyn Community continued into the 1990s, this was in contrast to non-Bryn Alyn Community homes.

In the 1970s and early 1980s, the Bryn Alyn Community had been led by John Allen. In 1991 the assets of the Bryn Alyn Community were split: John Allen took over Bryn Alyn Community Ltd "and turned his attention elsewhere, to London and Brighton particularly." The report concluded that from the late 1980s "Allen became less involved with the Community as financial difficulties arose and White senior assumed the dominant role". The new Bryn Alyn Community (Holdings) Ltd Company was formed in 1991 under the control of Kenneth White Senior (as the majority shareholder) and his son Kenneth White Junior. The new company retained the North Wales assets including Bryn Alyn itself.

The Waterhouse Inquiry highlighted the role of Kenneth White Junior as he had a child-facing role as the house director of Bryn Alyn Hall and was the subject of a complaint to North Wales Police for assault. Despite having been found to have "acted excessively" the North Wales Police decided not to prosecute Kenneth White Junior and he took up other administrative duties. As Kenneth White Senior's health declined, his son, Kenneth J White Jnr, "assumed an increasingly prominent role from the early 1990s."

=== The destruction of Bryn Alyn Community files ===
The Waterhouse Inquiry was unable to examine all the records of Bryn Alyn Community Holdings Ltd relating to children and potential witnesses due destruction of files in a fire, while the inquiry was underway.

"An additional problem has been the absence of any Community records of most of their residents because we were told in the course of our preliminary hearing that these records were destroyed in a fire that occurred on 25 October 1996 at a Pickfords storage depot in Hoole, near Chester. The result has been that the Tribunal's ability to trace former Community residents from outside North Wales has been limited."

The Macur Inquiry makes it clear the impact the loss of files on potential witnesses and records the notes from David Russell Evans, the Bryn Alyn Community Holdings Ltd Company Secretary.

A note of a telephone call made by the company secretary of the Bryn Alyn Community to the Tribunal that day refers to "the second set of files i.e. those not looked at by the police ...not the current files, were stored in Pickfords which burnt down today ... Will be gaps as no way of knowing what was lost in fire." The note continues that later that day "Sian [Griffiths] rang. Was sorting out Bryn Alyn files and conveniently (for Bryn Alyn) there are over 80 files of the key players missing ..."

Macur states that there is no evidence available to assert the 1996 fire was arson but the circumstances remain unclear.

=== Recommendations for change and aftermath ===
The Inquiry made 72 recommendations for changes, constituting a massive overhaul of the way in which children in care were dealt with by local councils, social services and the police.

After the report was published, a window opened to allow victims to claim for compensation. On top of cases which had previously been handled and closed directly by both councils, additional cases were handled by lead solicitors Nelsons of Nottingham. In total, 140 compensation claims were settled on behalf of victims by the time that the claim window closed in July 1999. Further, a Children's Commissioner for Wales was appointed as a result of one of the reports recommendations.

Immediately after the conclusion of the report the two remaining directors of Bryn Alyn Community Holdings Ltd, Kenneth J White Junior and David Russell Evans placed the company into liquidation. No assets remained to provide compensation to victims because the assets of the company were transferred to a new company. Bryn Alyn Hall reopened as children's nursery and currently as Alyn Lodge Bed & Breakfast run by White and Evans.

With the assets transferred out of the company, the victims continued with court action against the Bryn Alyn Community Holdings Ltd and their insurers. On 26 June 2001, judgement against the company was given in favour of 13 claimants against the company, which was a hollow victory due to the lack of company assets. However, the claim against the insurers was lost on appeal.

In a statement to the House of Commons, the Welsh Secretary Paul Murphy stated: "It is a tragedy that such treatment should have been meted out to children in care." Murphy said there was no evidence of a high-level paedophile conspiracy, but that a paedophile ring around Cheshire and Wrexham had preyed on young people in care in the 1970s and 1980s.

== The Secret of Bryn Estyn: The Making of a Modern Witch Hunt ==
In 2005, the cultural historian Richard Webster published a book, The Secret of Bryn Estyn: The Making of a Modern Witch Hunt, which investigated the scandal. It was highly critical of the Waterhouse Inquiry, argued that abuse scandals could be phenomena created by public hysteria, and reported a number of cases of apparently innocent care workers imprisoned as a consequence of false and unsubstantiated accusations elicited by police trawling operations. Webster also questioned whether some of those claiming abuse had been motivated by the prospect of financial reward.

Wrexham Council refused permission for a conference, arranged by Falsely Accused Carers and Teachers (F.A.C.T.), a support group, to be held at Bryn Estyn – now renamed the Erlas Centre – in 2005; Webster was to have been the main speaker.

== Further allegations and investigations in November 2012 ==
On 2 November 2012, following the revelations in the Jimmy Savile sexual abuse scandal, the BBC current affairs programme Newsnight aired an item about the scandal in which one of those who had suffered abuse in the 1980s, Steve Messham, made further allegations that there had been a much wider circle of abusers, including businessmen, members of the police and senior politicians, extending beyond the immediate area to London and beyond. He called for a further investigation to be carried out. The Children's Commissioner for Wales, Keith Towler, supported the call for an inquiry, stating that the remit of the Waterhouse Inquiry had been too narrow.

On 5 November 2012 the Prime Minister, David Cameron, said that any new allegations of abuse would be investigated, and announced that a "senior independent figure", later named as Mrs Justice Julia Macur, would be appointed to look urgently into the terms of the original inquiry and whether it was properly constituted. Tom Watson MP called for a wider ranging inquiry, and referred to allegations of abuse by a former Cabinet minister. The Home Secretary, Theresa May, said that "... we should look to make sure that the work that was done in relation to the Waterhouse inquiry did cover everything that it needed to cover." She announced on 6 November that Keith Bristow, the head of the National Crime Agency, would lead an investigation into how old claims of abuse were handled, and at fresh allegations. The investigation would involve the Serious Organised Crime Agency (SOCA) and the Child Exploitation and Online Protection Centre (CEOP), and would report by April 2013. The investigation was subsequently known as Operation Pallial.

The Shadow Home Secretary, Yvette Cooper, called for a single, overarching public inquiry to be held in order to examine all the recent allegations of child abuse, including those relating to the Jimmy Savile scandal, a call which was supported by former minister Tim Loughton and by the National Society for the Prevention of Cruelty to Children. On 7 November, Ann Clwyd MP called for the 1994 Jillings report to be published.

On 6 November, Channel 4 News reported that Sir Peter Morrison, a former aide to Margaret Thatcher and MP for Chester, who died in 1995, had been 'seen' driving a boy away from the Bryn Estyn home. The Conservative Party said that they were investigating the claims. The Guardian reported that references made to the alleged involvement of another prominent Conservative politician may have been the result of confusion over the identities of two people sharing the same surname. Lord McAlpine subsequently released a statement denying the allegations and describing them as "seriously defamatory". A week after the Newsnight programme, on 9 November, the BBC apologised "unreservedly" for its broadcast, after Steve Messham apologised for the mistaken identity. The Director-General of the BBC, George Entwistle, stated that he had been unaware of the content of the report before it was broadcast, and, after further criticism in the media, resigned on 10 November.

In 2012 "Ben" claimed in an interview with the Sun that Jimmy Savile was involved.

A former ITV journalist, Paddy French, claimed in November 2012 that Waterhouse had been surprised that evidence from Des Frost, a former Deputy Director of Bryn Alyn, had not been reported to his inquiry despite Frost reporting abuse to the police.

== Operation Pallial ==
On 17 December 2012 it was reported that Operation Pallial had received information from 105 possible victims of abuse in North Wales care homes, across 22 police force areas across the UK and Ireland. The investigation involved 27 police officers and staff, mainly from forces in north west England, supported by SOCA. Senior investigating officer Detective Superintendent Ian Mulcahey of Merseyside Police said that "Operation Pallial is investigating new allegations of historic child abuse, some from victims previously known about and some from victims who have come forward for the first time. All victims of abuse have a right to expect all allegations of abuse, no matter how much time has passed, to be investigated professionally and appropriately. We will do so. Equally importantly, if offenders are still alive they must be identified, investigated and brought to justice, with those who still have access to children being prioritised." A report, to be submitted to the Chief Constable of North Wales Police and the Home Secretary, Theresa May, was being prepared for publication in April 2013.

The report of Phase One of Operation Pallial was published on 29 April 2013. It set out a total of 140 allegations of abuse, involving girls and boys between the ages of 7 and 19, at 18 children's homes in north Wales between 1963 and 1992. During the inquiry, 76 new complainants came forward, and the police reported allegations against 84 people, of whom 16 had been named by more than one complainant. Some of those named were dead. The Chief Constable of North Wales, Mark Polin, said: "Offenders quite rightly should have to look over their shoulders for the rest of their lives."

Operation Pallial was prosecuted by Wales CPS. Leading Counsel was Eleanor Laws QC and Junior Counsel, Catherine Donnelly.

On 15 August the police announced that a fifth man, aged 62, had been arrested in connection with Operation Pallial, on suspicion of buggery and indecent assault on two boys in the 1980s. A 52-year-old man from Mold was arrested in the St. Helens area on 10 October, on suspicion of child cruelty and indecent assault against four boys and one girl between 1981 and 1988.

In November 2013, the police stated that, since November 2012, 235 people had contacted them with information about alleged abuse in care homes in north Wales. Detective Superintendent Mulcahey said that over 100 names of alleged offenders had been put forward to Operation Pallial, and said that the police were "currently pursuing a large number of active lines of enquiry". A fifteenth arrest, of a 62-year-old man from Mold, was reported on 20 November. Further arrests, bringing the total to 18, were reported on 12 December. In July 2014, the BBC reported that 275 people had made allegations, and 49 possible suspects were being investigated.

In August 2014, the National Crime Agency announced that Operation Pallial had interviewed further witnesses to paedophilia committed by Peter Howarth, who had died in prison in 1997. "The offences, ranging from indecent assault to buggery, were all against boys aged between 11 and 12 and between 14 and 16 years old at the time they were alleged to have taken place."

=== John Allen prosecutions, custody and death ===
John Allen, now aged 71, the one-time head of the Bryn Alyn Community, appeared in a magistrates court at Mold on 1 August 2013, charged with 32 serious sexual offences relating to allegations of historical child abuse, and was remanded in custody, to reappear at Caernarfon Crown Court a week later.

In October 2014, John Allen appeared at Mold Crown Court accused of 40 counts of sexual abuse against 19 boys and one girl, aged between 7 and 15, during the 1960s and 1970s. At the time, Allen ran the Bryn Alyn Community which owned three children's residential homes near Wrexham. It was said that Allen employed child care staff at the homes, but involved himself in the work especially at night, and created a "sexualised atmosphere alongside a culture of fear" at the homes, in particular at Bryn Alyn, Pentre Saeson and Bryn Terion. Allen denied all the charges, but was found guilty on 33. On 1 December, Mr Justice Openshaw sentenced Allen to life imprisonment with a minimum term of 11 years.

Allen was found guilty of seven more offences in December 2019, and sentenced to 14 years in early 2020. Allen died in prison, HMP Bure in Norfolk on 3 May 2025.

== Gordon Anglesea ==
On 4 November 2016, former police superintendent Gordon Anglesea was sentenced to 12 years in prison for the sexual abuse of a 14 and 15-year-old boy, with one of the victims being a resident of the Bryn Estyn care home. Anglesea had faced media allegations of involvement in sexual abuse at the home since the early 1990s, and had successfully sued four media organisations for libel in 1994, winning £375,000. Anglesea died on 15 December 2016, while serving his sentence at HM Prison Rye Hill.

== See also ==
- Institutional abuse
