= Ibrahim Hewitt =

British writer journalist and chairman

Ibrahim Hewitt is a British journalist, chairman of the board of trustees of Interpal and a senior editor at Middle East Monitor. A Muslim activist from Leicester, Hewitt is a media and education consultant and has been the chairman of the Palestinian Relief and Development Fund (Interpal) since 1997.

Hewitt is also a school inspector and head of the Al-Aqsa School in Leicester. He received an honorary doctorate from the Islamic University in Gaza for his material support for both the university and the Palestinian people. He is also a trustee of the International Board of Educational Research and Resources (IBERR), founded by Yusuf Islam (aka, Cat Stevens), which distributes Islamic educational material around the world. Hewitt was also the Secretary General of the Muslim Council of Britain from 2004 to 2006, a UK consortium dominated by the Pakistani Islamist group, Jamaat-e-Islami.

Hewitt has been praised by Jeremy Corbyn, who 2 years later became leader of the Labour Party (UK). He spoke publicly at an event in 2013: "Over a very long period of time I’ve got to know Ibrahim Hewitt, the chair, extremely well. I consider him to be a very good friend and I think he’s done a fantastic job in leading and guiding Interpal which has done such great practical work." Hewitt has been accused of being an Islamist extremist in the British press.

== Conversion to Islam ==
Ibrahim Hewitt was born Brian Hewitt. In the 1970s he was a musician who featured regularly on the British club and orchestra scene playing the tuba and the trombone, among other brass instruments. He eventually obtained a position in a British Army band. He also had the opportunity to play with the British musician Sting in the Newcastle Big Band.

While touring the club scene in the UK, Hewitt became an alcoholic as a result of regularly performing in bars and being around musicians. Recalling this moment in his life he wrote, ""I lost days because of alcohol. When you wake up after a night out, it is terrible. Looking back, it is shameful".

In 1979, while proclaiming to be an agnostic, he met a group of Muslims from South Africa. Soon afterwards, Hewitt travelled to South Africa to visit them in the Indian township of Azaadville. While in South Africa, Hewitt discovered the horrors of Apartheid first hand. He was refused service in restaurants because he was accompanied by "non-whites", and discovered that there were racially segregated churches.

One night he was invited by his friends to tour a new mosque just south of Johannesburg. There he discovered that there were all different races grouped together in prayer. He began to see Islam as a means to equality between people of different backgrounds: "Despite the segregation of Apartheid, people of different races were all praying together in one place! So I wondered how this was happening in South Africa of all places."

It was after this moment that Hewitt began to read books about Islam, out of curiosity rather than because he wanted to convert. For two years, Hewitt seeped himself in research before finally converting. Islam helped Hewitt to stop drinking. In 1981 he adopted the Islamic name Ibrahim, gave up music, and quit his job at an insurance firm.

While Hewitt's mother accepted his conversion, his father threw him out of the house, refusing to speak to his son for two years. Hewitt only reunited with his father after Hewitt's mother became ill.

Hewitt thinks that it is only a matter of time before everyone becomes Muslim, "I became a Muslim in 1981. It is up to you to decide when you too will become Muslim."

Hewitt is the founder of the Association of Muslim Schools (AMS).

== Controversy ==
Much of the controversy that surrounds Hewitt is based on a book that he wrote and published in the 1990s entitled What does Islam Say? The book includes negative attitudes towards homosexuality, including a quotation from the Hadith advocating punishment by death, "Prophet Muhammad said: "If you find anyone doing as Lot's people did (i.e. homosexual sodomy), kill the one who does it".

Some of the more contentious sections from the book include referring to homosexuality as an "abominable practice", and comparing homosexuality to pedophilia: "The advice would be the same as, say, to someone who had sexual desired for minors or close family; that having the desired does not legitimate realizing them." Hewitt writes that homosexuality damages the fabric of society but he nevertheless denies advocating violence against homosexuals despite claims made in his book that support the lashing of gay men and fornicators.

Hewitt has been the subject of media attention, and has been called – among other things – an extremist to an anti-Semite. The Times in London published an apology for referring to Hewitt an Anti-Semite. He is chairman of Interpal, a Muslim charity which was added to the U.S. Treasury’s list of Specially Designated Global Terrorist Organizations in 2003. Interpal is alleged to have used their charity designation to funnel money to Hamas.

=== Response ===
In 2015, Hewitt published a response to the national press, particularly to The Sun and The Times who had called him an "Islamic extremist." Hewitt claims "the purpose of the articles was clearly to damage" then "Labour Party leadership candidate" Jeremy Corbyn "by showing what 'bad' company he keeps". Interpal, and Al-Aqsa School, "have been dragged into the mire". Corbyn praised Hewitt and Interpal in 2013.

In his response, Hewitt claimed that while Interpal is specially designated in the U.S. for funding Hamas, the charity denies these allegations. According to him, Interpal was cleared by the Charity Commission in 2009 after over two years of inquiry. According to Hewitt, the charity commission report found that “there has been nothing brought to the inquiry’s attention that suggests that the charity’s funding has been siphoned off for inappropriate or non-charitable purposes.” [2] He denied that his charity has ever funded Hamas and asserted that the United States never produced evidence to that effect, nor was there any due process, despite the designation. He claimed that lawyers for Interpal are currently working with the U.S. Treasury to have the designation removed.

Speaking about his 1994 book, What Does Islam Say?, Hewitt denies that his call for violent punishment for adulterers has any bearing on his personal view of the world, "In that book, the question of adultery and apostasy is dealt with on the bases of a Prophetic saying in two key texts after the Holy Qur’an. There are texts in the Old Testament that call for equally draconian punishment. These do not mean that I would advocate such actions. Of course I do not; If I did, I would rightly be arrested for doing so." He rejects news reports that refer to him as either a cleric or a preacher.

In regards to the allegations against Al-Aqsa school, Hewitt denies that child protection is based on sharia law: "Like all policies at the school, 'safeguarding children' is based on the regulations required by law for the school to follow."
