= Laura Cox (judge) =

English judge

Dame Laura Mary Cox DBE (born 8 November 1951), styled The Hon. Mrs Justice Cox, is a former English High Court judge of the Queen's Bench Division, serving from 2002 until her retirement in 2016. Before serving on the bench, she was a barrister who specialised in employment law, discrimination and human rights.

== Affiliations ==
- Head of Cloisters Chambers, Temple (1995–2002)
- Chairperson of the Bar Council Sex Discrimination Committee (1995–99) and Equal Opportunities Committee (1999–2002)
- Bencher of the Inner Temple; member of the Independent Human Rights Organization Justice (former Council member) and *Lawyers of Liberty (the National Council for Civil Liberties), co-founder
- Vice-President of the Institute of Employment Rights
- Panel of Experts advising the Cambridge University Independent Review of Discrimination Legislation, panel member
- Honorary Fellow of Queen Mary College, London University (2005)
- Council of the University of London (2003–06), member
- President of the Association of Women Barristers
- United Kingdom Association of Women Judges, committee member

== Judicial career ==
She was appointed as a Queen's Bench Division judge in the High Court on 4 November 2002, and was awarded, as customary, a damehood (DBE).

== See also ==
- Murder of Sian O'Callaghan
