= Terrorist front organization =

A terrorist front organization is created to conceal activities or provide logistical or financial support to the illegal activities.

== See also ==
- Hawala, an informal value transfer system useful to terrorists (and criminals and others) for transmission of money outside of regulated channels.
- List of charities accused of ties to terrorism

== Sources ==
- Hawala. An Informal Payment System and Its Use to Finance Terrorism by Sebastian R. Müller (Dec. 2006) ISBN 3-86550-656-9 ISBN 978-3-86550-656-6
