= Julia Macur =

British judge (born 1957)

The Right Honourable Lady Justice Macur
- Royal coat of arms of the United Kingdom

Lady Justice of Appeal
- In office 31 July 2013 – 4 October 2025
- Monarchs: Elizabeth II; Charles III

High Court Judge Family Division
- In office 2005–2013

Personal details
- Born: 17 April 1957 (age 69) United Kingdom
- Education: University of Sheffield

Dame Julia Wendy Macur, DBE (born 17 April 1957), known as The Rt Hon Lady Justice Macur, was a British judge of the Court of Appeal of England and Wales. Between April 2017 and December 2019, she was the Senior Presiding Judge for England and Wales.

She studied law at the University of Sheffield, graduating in 1978. She was called to the bar in 1979, and was a practising barrister on the Midland and Oxford Circuit between 1979 and 2005, working in Birmingham.

She was appointed Queen's Counsel in 1998, and was a Recorder of the Crown Court between 1999 and 2005, when she was appointed to the High Court. On 31 July 2013, she was appointed a Lady Justice of Appeal a position from which she retired with effect from 4 October 2025.

In November 2012 she was appointed by Home Secretary Theresa May to review, the terms of the Waterhouse inquiry into the North Wales child abuse scandal, which had reported in 2000.

In 2015, it was announced she would become Deputy Senior Presiding Judge from 1 January 2016 and Senior Presiding Judge for England and Wales from 1 January 2018; this was brought forward to April 2017 on the appointment of Lord Justice Fulford as the Investigatory Powers Commissioner.
