= Falsely Accused Carers and Teachers =

British support group

Falsely Accused Carers and Teachers, which usually uses the acronym F.A.C.T., is a voluntary organisation set up in the United Kingdom to support carers, teachers, and other professionals who have been falsely accused and/or wrongly convicted of abuse or misconduct; and to campaign for improvements in investigative practice and for reform of the criminal justice system.

The organisation developed from support groups for those accused of abusing children in the residential care system. The first group was set up in North Wales in 1992, to support those accused of abuse as part of the North Wales child abuse scandal. F.A.C.T. itself was set up in late 1999, following allegations of abuse made across North West England, notably at the St George's School in Formby, Merseyside, where one of those accused and later cleared of all charges was football manager Dave Jones. Several other local groups later merged with it to form a national organisation.

F.A.C.T. has submitted evidence to several inquiries into child abuse and the criminal justice system. In 2005, Wrexham Council refused permission for a conference, arranged by F.A.C.T. and at which cultural historian Richard Webster was to have been the main speaker, to be held at the former Bryn Estyn children's home. In November 2012 the organisation criticised what it called "false allegations and wrongful convictions" in relation to the North Wales child abuse scandal.

== See also ==
- Presumption of guilt
