= Islamic Charitable Society =

Non-profit charitable organisation in Palestine

- الجمعية الخيرية الإسلامية
- Formation: 1962
- Headquarters: Hebron, West Bank, Palestine
- Website: Official website

The Islamic Charitable Society (Arabic: الجمعية الخيرية الإسلامية, romanized: Aljameiat alkhayriat al'iislamia) is a non-profit charitable organisation located in Hebron in the West Bank, Palestine. The charity was founded in 1962 to take care of orphans and expanded through years. It is now responsible for two orphanages, three schools for boys and girls, dairy, sewing workshop, two bakeries, a large mall and a 30-apartment building.

According to a 2006 episode of the BBC series Panorama, the Islamic Charitable Society has received funding from Interpal and is associated with Hamas. Citing the Charity Commission for England and Wales and a draft report from the U.S. Treasury's Asset Freezing Working Group, it was alleged on that the Islamic Charitable Society has "a well-documented supporting role within the Hamas infrastructure" and that it had "funded and administered educational programmes that appear tantamount to incitement and indoctrination in support of violent Hamas activity.
