= Murder of Sian O'Callaghan =

2011 murder in the United Kingdom

Sian O'Callaghan
- Born: Sian Emma O'Callaghan; 3 June 1988; Swindon, Wiltshire, England
- Disappeared: 19 March 2011 (aged 22); Swindon, Wiltshire, England
- Body discovered: 24 March 2011; Uffington, Oxfordshire, England
- Occupation: Office administrator
- Known for: Murder victim

Sian Emma O'Callaghan (3 June 1988 – c. 19 March 2011) was a 22-year-old British woman who disappeared from Swindon, Wiltshire, England, having last been seen at a nightclub in the town in the early hours of 19 March 2011. Her body was found on 24 March near Uffington in Oxfordshire. On 19 October 2012, at Bristol Crown Court, 48-year-old Christopher Halliwell pleaded guilty to O'Callaghan's murder.

== Timeline ==
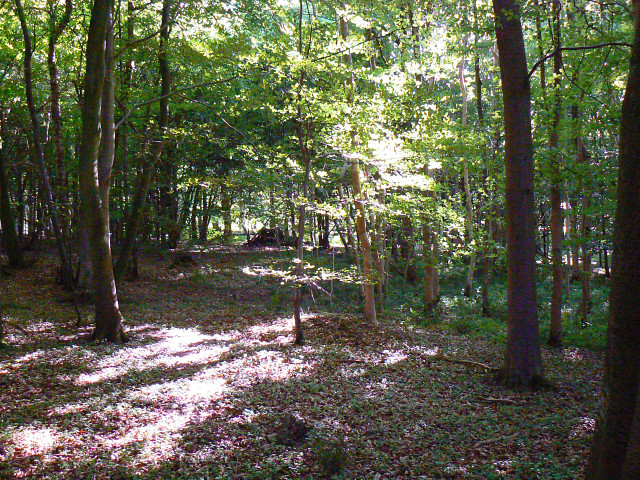
Savernake Forest was searched extensively by police and members of the public

At 02:52 on 19 March 2011, O'Callaghan was captured on CCTV leaving Swindon's Suju nightclub to walk 800 metres (0.50 mi) to the flat that she shared with her boyfriend, Kevin Reape, in Swindon's Old Town area. Reape sent O'Callaghan a text message at 03:24; analysis later showed that her mobile phone was in the Savernake Forest area, 12 miles (19 km) away, at the time the message was received. At 09:45, Reape contacted the police and reported O'Callaghan as missing.

On 20 March, the police issued their first public appeal for information, and announced that they had begun searching Savernake Forest. They stated that the time that elapsed between O'Callaghan's appearance on the club's CCTV and her mobile phone signal (02:52 and 03:24 respectively) meant that the journey from Swindon to the forest could only have been made in a vehicle. On 22 March, approximately 400 members of the public joined the police in their search of the forest. The same day, an anonymous donor offered a £20,000 reward for information that would lead to finding O'Callaghan.

On 23 March, police announced that analysis of O'Callaghan's mobile phone signals led to the identification of a number of "hot spots" to be investigated. Detective Superintendent Stephen Fulcher of Wiltshire Police said that the investigation was moving at a "rapid pace", and that "significant lines of inquiry" were being developed. Members of the public were asked to stand down from searches. On 24 March, police made an urgent appeal for witnesses of a green Toyota Avensis with taxi markings, which had been seen between Swindon and Savernake Forest shortly after O'Callaghan's disappearance.

=== Arrest and discovery of body ===
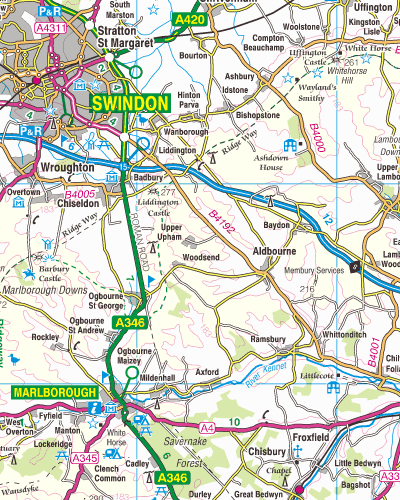
O'Callaghan went missing from Swindon and her body was found near Uffington (top-right). Savernake Forest is located at the bottom of the map.

On the afternoon of 24 March, police arrested a 47-year-old taxicab driver, Christopher Halliwell, from Swindon on suspicion of kidnapping. The arrest was made at an Asda supermarket in north Swindon, where a green Toyota Avensis taxi was also seized. Later the same day, O'Callaghan's body was found in a shallow grave near Uffington, Oxfordshire.

On 26 March, the suspect was charged with O'Callaghan's murder. During a news conference on 26 March, Fulcher stated that tests revealed O'Callaghan had not been sexually assaulted. On 1 April, the inquest at Oxford coroner's court was told that it was likely O'Callaghan died from head injuries, though a forensic pathologist from the Home Office had yet to confirm a precise cause of death. O'Callaghan's funeral was held at Kingsdown Crematorium on 18 April 2011.

== Trial and subsequent events ==
R v. Halliwell
- Court: Bristol Crown Court
- Decided: October 19, 2012; 13 years ago
- Verdict: guilty
- Charge: murder of O'Callaghan

Case history
- Appealed to: Court of Appeal

On 31 May 2012, taxi driver Christopher Halliwell appeared in court at a plea and case management hearing, and pleaded not guilty to the charge of murdering Sian O'Callaghan. On 19 October 2012, he appeared at Bristol Crown Court and pleaded guilty to her murder. He was sentenced to life imprisonment with a minimum tariff of 25 years. The Court of Appeal upheld the sentence on 14 December 2012.

=== Becky Godden-Edwards murder ===
Following the guilty plea, it emerged that a second murder charge against Halliwell had been dropped as a result of an error in the police handling of the case. The body of Becky Godden-Edwards, 20, a woman who had been reported missing in 2007, was found after Halliwell's arrest; he had led police to the body. Justice Laura Cox ruled that Halliwell's confessions to killing each of the women were inadmissible as evidence, as Detective Superintendent Stephen Fulcher had breached the guidelines of the Police and Criminal Evidence Act 1984 by failing to caution Halliwell and denying him access to a solicitor during the period that the confessions were obtained.

On 23 April 2013, an inquest at Oxford Coroner's Court into the death of Godden-Edwards recorded a narrative verdict stating that the cause of her death, believed to have been in the final days of 2002 or early in 2003, was "unascertained but probably caused unlawfully by a third party". In September 2013, the Independent Police Complaints Commission published the result of an investigation, which found that Fulcher had a case to answer for gross misconduct for breaches of the Police and Criminal Evidence Act and for ignoring force orders. In January 2014, he was found guilty of gross misconduct and given a final written warning by a disciplinary tribunal. In May 2014, Fulcher resigned from Wiltshire Police. Karen Edwards, the mother of Becky Godden-Edwards, commented: "Had he have followed the guidelines, then Becky would never have been found, she would have never have come into the equation."

R v. Halliwell
- Court: Bristol Crown Court
- Decided: September 19, 2016; 9 years ago
- Verdict: guilty
- Charge: murder

Case history
- Related action: Independent Police Complaints Commission investigation

On 31 March 2016, Christopher Halliwell was charged with the murder of Godden-Edwards before magistrates in Chippenham, Wiltshire. On 19 September 2016, a jury at Bristol Crown Court found him guilty of the murder after two hours of deliberation. On 23 September, Justice John Griffith Williams sentenced Halliwell to life imprisonment with a whole life order for the murder, meaning he would serve his sentence without the possibility of parole.

On 2 September 2019, ITV broadcast the first episode of A Confession, a six-part drama series based on the case, with Martin Freeman playing Detective Superintendent Fulcher and Joe Absolom playing Halliwell. In September 2022, an investigation by the Independent Office for Police Conduct found that Wiltshire Police had missed significant opportunities between 2011 and 2014 to bring Halliwell to justice sooner for the murder.

== Alleged links to other cases ==
In 2020, Merseyside Police opened an investigation into the unsolved murder of Julie Finley in 1994, after reports of a possible link to Halliwell. By December 2022, no charges had been made. In 2023, a Channel 4 documentary, In the Footsteps of Killers, suggested a link between Halliwell and the disappearance of Trevaline Evans who went missing from her antiques shop in Llangollen, though this link remains unproven.

Fulcher also suggested a possible link between Halliwell and the 2009 disappearance of Claudia Lawrence. North Yorkshire Police stated in 2023 that it was "unlikely that Halliwell left the Wiltshire area, or was present in North Yorkshire, at the time of Claudia’s disappearance", and Wiltshire Police have disclosed that they have CCTV evidence of Halliwell buying petrol in Swindon on the evening before Lawrence disappeared. In regard to Halliwell's possible involvement, Lawrence's mother stated "The police may not have proved he had anything to do with my daughter's disappearance, but they haven't disproved it either".

Additionally, Fulcher linked Halliwell to the disappearance of Swindon teacher Linda Razzell on 19 March 2002. However, Razzell's husband was convicted of her murder and her family have stated that they have no doubt over his guilt and conviction. In 2018, a miscarriage of justice organisation, Inside Justice, investigated the Razzell case (and the alleged links to Halliwell) as part of a BBC documentary, Conviction, but it concluded that the conviction was safe and stated there was nothing linking Halliwell to the crime other than speculation.

== See also ==
- Chris Clark – crime writer who in a 2021 book The New Millennium Serial Killer claimed Halliwell could be linked to more murders
- Murder of Elizabeth McCabe – unsolved murder of a Dundee woman in 1980 that occurred in similar circumstances
- List of kidnappings
- Lists of solved missing person cases
- List of prisoners with whole-life orders
- Murder of Lindsay Rimer – an unsolved murder that has previously been linked to Halliwell
- Brewer v. Williams – U.S. Supreme Court case arising from similar circumstances
