= Daud Abdullah =

Grenadan politician

- Born: 1955 (age 69–70); St. George's, Grenada
- Known for: Deputy Secretary General of the Muslim Council of Britain Director of Middle East Monitor

Daud A. Abdullah is a former Deputy Secretary General of the Muslim Council of Britain.

== Life and career ==
Daud Abdullah was born in St. David's Grenada where he received his early education. He obtained his first degree from the University of Guyana in 1981 and was awarded a scholarship to study Arabic language at King Saud University in Saudi Arabia. In 1984 he joined the University of Khartoum, Sudan to pursue postgraduate studies and was awarded his doctorate in 1989. His last posting in Saudi Arabia was as editor and translator at the Abul Qasim Publishing House in Jeddah.

He then lectured in history at the University of Maiduguri in Nigeria. Since moving to the United Kingdom with his family in the mid-1990s Abdullah has been senior researcher at the Palestinian Return Centre, London. He has been a regular contributor to Impact International and the Palestine Times. He is editor of The Israeli Law of Return & its Impact on the Struggle in Palestine.

Abdullah comments on Palestinian affairs in the British and Arab media.

Since July 1996 Abdullah has been senior researcher at the London-based Palestinian Return Centre and editor of the Return Review, which has recently been replaced with the Journal of Palestinian Refugees Studies.

Abdullah was Assistant Secretary General of the Muslim Council of Britain from 2003 to 2006. He chaired the European and international Affairs Committee during the period 2004–2006 and represented the MCB in several delegations abroad. He has been a spokesperson for the MCB both in the British and international media. He was both their Deputy Secretary General and their Chair of Europe & International Affairs Committee. Abdullah formerly lectured in 'Introduction to Islam' module of the Islamic Studies CertHE at Birkbeck Stratford.

He is chairman and khateeb of Masjid Annoor in Acton, west London and has been a guest lecturer on Islamic and Palestinian affairs at many universities in the UK including Queen's University in Belfast.

Abdullah is a trustee of the Centre for the Study of Terrorism.

He is also the director Middle East Monitor, a news website, and set up the British Muslim Initiative.

== Views ==
While deputy secretary general of the Muslim Council of Britain, Abdullah signed a declaration that the British government interpreted as inciting the killing of British army personnel.

== Books ==
How the Zionist Colonization of Palestine Radicalized British Muslims in T. Abbas (ed.)

Islamic Political Radicalization – A European Perspective, Edinburgh, Edinburgh University Press, 2007

A History of Palestinian Resistance, Al Aqsa Publishers, Leicester, 2005

The Israeli Law of Return & its Impact on the Struggle in Palestine, Palestinian Return Centre, London, 2004.

== Istanbul Declaration controversy ==
In March 2009, the Observer newspaper reported that individuals including Abdullah had signed what became known as the Istanbul Declaration (not to be confused with the 2004 Istanbul summit) in January of that year. This was in relation to opposition to Operation Cast Lead, the Israeli military action in Gaza of December 2008 and January 2009. The BBC reported the conference as clerics meeting "senior Hamas officials to plot a new jihad centred on Gaza".

In an open letter from the then Secretary of State for Communities and Local Government, Hazel Blears wrote to the MCB saying Abdullah should be asked to resign his post for signing the statement which supported Hamas and celebrated its "victory" against "this malicious Jewish Zionist war over Gaza".

In her letter, dated 13 March, Blears wrote: "In light of the MCB's unequivocal stance on violence, it would seem that Dr Abdullah's position as the deputy secretary general would be incompatible with his recent actions." The deadline set by Blears for Abdullah's dismissal passed, with MCB leaders deciding to stand by him.

In a response, also published in the Guardian newspaper, Abdullah called her remarks a "misguided and ill-advised attempt to exercise control" stated his intention to remain in position. Subsequently, he announced his intention to sue Hazel Blears, in respect of her office, should she not retract her letter and issue an apology by 15 April 2009.

A letter from the Treasury Solicitors, acting on behalf of Hazel Blears and HM Government, to Abdullah's solicitors revealed their willingness to continue with such a course of action . It closed with the statement, "It follows, of course, that your offer of settlement is rejected". No further reports of attempts to pursue a libel case by Adbullah or the MCB have been heard.
