= Murder of April Jones =

2012 child murder in Wales

- Undated photo of April Jones
- Location: Machynlleth, Powys, Wales
- Date: 1 October 2012; 14 years ago
- Attack type: Child murder, child abduction
- Deaths: 1
- Perpetrator: Mark Bridger
- Verdict: Guilty on all counts
- Convictions: Murder; Child abduction; Perverting the course of justice
- Sentence: Life imprisonment (whole life order)

April Sue-Lyn Jones (4 April 2007 – c. 1 October 2012) was a Welsh child from Machynlleth, Powys, who disappeared on 1 October 2012, after being sighted getting into a vehicle near her home. Her disappearance, at the age of five, generated a large amount of national and international press coverage. Mark Bridger was arrested and later charged with April's murder.

On 30 May 2013, Bridger was found guilty of April's abduction and murder, in addition to perverting the course of justice. He was sentenced to life imprisonment with a whole life order, meaning that he will serve the sentence without the possibility of parole.

== Disappearance ==
On the evening of 1 October 2012, April Jones attended swimming lessons at a local leisure centre while her mother and father attended a parents' evening at her school. Afterwards, Jones invited a school friend to come to her house. They were allowed to play outside, with April's mother telling her not to be out for too long. She was last seen by her parents at approximately 7:00 p.m. At 7:15 p.m. she was playing with her friends at the Bryn-y-Gog housing estate in Machynlleth.

At 7:29 p.m. April's mother was unable to find her and dialled 999 to report her missing, summoning an officer from the Dyfed-Powys Police. The first officer on the scene spoke to a child witness who reported seeing April climbing into a grey van. The Dyfed-Powys Police immediately upgraded the investigation to a "critical incident" and launched a massive search across Machynlleth. Many civilians, some alerted by social media, joined in the search, with the number swelling into the hundreds by the early morning hours of 2 October.

== Search ==
On 3 October, April's mother made an appeal for information. The following day, Prime Minister David Cameron also issued an appeal to the public, commenting that "clearly having this happen to you, and the fact that she suffers from cerebral palsy, something I know a little about from my own children, only makes this worse. My appeal would be to everyone. If you know anything, if you saw anything, heard anything, have any ideas you can bring forward, talk to the police."

In the days following April's disappearance, a large search operation mounted around the Machynlleth area, involving police and search and rescue teams using specialised equipment, as well as hundreds of volunteers. On 12 December, police stated that the search would continue into 2013.

On 27 March 2013, police said that they would call off the search, which officially ended on 22 April. The police stated that "a reactive team of specialist officers are available to respond to any new information that is received". This was the largest missing person search in UK police history.

== Murder inquiry ==
Mark Bridger, a 46-year-old local man, was arrested on the afternoon of 2 October 2012, less than 24 hours after April went missing. He became a suspect in the case because he matched a description of the man and the vehicle, a left-hand drive Land Rover Discovery which an eyewitness had seen April entering following a conversation with the driver.

On 5 October 2012, police officially designated the case a murder inquiry even though a body had not been found; this was the first indication that the police now had reason to believe that April was dead. Sky News presenter Kay Burley was accused, by social media users, of insensitivity after breaking the news that the case was now a murder investigation live on air to volunteers who had been searching for her.

On 6 October, Bridger was charged with abduction, murder, and attempting to pervert the course of justice. He appeared before magistrates at Aberystwyth on 8 October, where he was additionally charged with the unlawful concealment and disposal of a body. He was remanded into custody and held at HMP Manchester pending an appearance at Caernarfon Crown Court, which occurred on 10 October via video-link.

On 14 January 2013, at Mold Crown Court, Bridger pleaded not guilty to murder, but accepted that he was "probably responsible" for April's death. The trial was to begin on 25 February at Mold Crown Court, but it was adjourned until 29 April at the request of Bridger's defence team in order to make further enquiries.

== Perpetrator ==
Mark Leonard Bridger was born at the War Memorial Hospital in Carshalton, Surrey, on 6 November 1965, the second of three children born to policeman Graham Bridger and his wife Pamela. He has an older sister and younger brother. He grew up in a semi-detached house in Wallington, Surrey. He attended John Ruskin High School in Croydon, leaving with seven CSEs.

Bridger had a string of convictions for minor offences stretching back to the mid-1980s. When he was 19 he was convicted of firearms offences and theft. He moved to Wales in the 1980s, and there he was convicted in 1991 of criminal damage, affray, and driving without insurance. The next year, he was convicted again, for driving while disqualified and without insurance. In 2004 he was convicted of battery and threatening behaviour; in 2007 he received his fifth conviction, this time for assault.

Bridger's work history was varied; he had been an abattoir worker, hotel porter, fireman, lifeguard, mechanic, and welder. He fathered six children by four women, and was married once, to the mother of two of his children, from 1990 until the marriage ended in divorce several years later.

== Trial ==
Bridger's trial began on 29 April 2013 before Mr Justice Griffith Williams. A scientific expert told the court that fragments of human bone consistent with a "younger individual" had been found in the fireplace of Bridger's cottage. Blood found in several parts of the cottage was matched to April's DNA, and was enough to convince the police that April had suffered injuries from which she could not have survived — and to persuade the Crown Prosecution Service to charge Bridger with murder.

In his defence, Bridger claimed that he had accidentally run over April in his car and could not remember disposing of her body due to being under the influence of alcohol and being in a state of panic. On 29 May the judge concluded his summing-up, and directed the jury to retire to consider its verdicts. On 30 May 2013, Bridger was found guilty of abduction, murder, and perverting the course of justice. Later that day, he was sentenced to life imprisonment with a whole life order; the judge described him as a "pathological and glib liar" and "a paedophile" in his sentencing remarks.

After the verdict, it was revealed that Bridger had confessed to the Strangeways prison chaplain that he had disposed of April's body in the fast-flowing Afon Dulas, which flows past Bridger's house before terminating in the River Dyfi near Machynlleth. Dyfed-Powys Police have said they doubt Bridger's claims and believe he scattered April's remains across the countryside near his house.

In July 2013, several weeks into his sentence, Bridger was attacked in Wakefield prison by an unnamed prisoner with an improvised weapon, resulting in facial and throat injuries, for which he received sutures. In December 2013, Bridger commenced an appeal against his whole-life tariff, but dropped the appeal a month later, days before it was due to be heard.

== Aftermath ==
=== Funeral ===
Although April's body was never found, 17 fragments of bone were recovered from the fireplace in Bridger's cottage. Her funeral was held at St Peter's Church in Machynlleth on 26 September 2013, with the coffin transported in a white and glass hearse, drawn by two white horses wearing pink feather plumes. The procession was followed by hundreds of mourners.

=== Changes to web search engines ===
After Bridger's arrest, police discovered an extensive collection of child sexual abuse material on his computer.

In November 2013, following campaigning by April's parents which was also backed by several national newspapers, Google and Bing modified their systems to block results from searches aimed at producing child abuse images.

=== House in Ceinws ===
On 4 August 2014, it was announced that Bridger's cottage in Ceinws, where April is believed to have been killed, had been purchased by the Welsh Government for £149,000. The cottage had been empty since Bridger's arrest nearly two years earlier. It was demolished in November 2014, while her family watched.

== See also ==
- List of murder convictions without a body
- List of solved missing person cases (2010s)
