= Ronald Waterhouse (judge) =

British judge

Sir Ronald Waterhouse GBE

Judge of the High Court of England and Wales
- In office 1978–1996

Personal details
- Born: Ronald Gough Waterhouse; 8 May 1926 Holywell, Flintshire, Wales
- Died: 8 May 2011 (aged 85)

Sir Ronald Gough Waterhouse (8 May 1926 – 8 May 2011) was a judge of the High Court of England and Wales between 1978 and 1996. As a judge his highest profile case was when he presided over the acquittal of comedian Ken Dodd on charges of tax evasion. Immediately upon his retirement he led a three-year inquiry into the North Wales child abuse scandal, which reported in 2000.

== Life and career ==
Ronald Gough Waterhouse was born in Holywell, Flintshire, North Wales, one of five children of a textile mill manager who was also a prominent local Liberal politician. He studied at Holywell Grammar School (now Ysgol Treffynnon), trained as a pilot with the RAF Volunteer Reserve, and began studying law at St John's College, Cambridge. Returning to university after the Second World War, he became President of the Cambridge Union and President of the Cambridge University Liberal Club in 1950. He was called to the bar in 1952.

He established a common law practice in London and on the Wales and Chester Circuit, and, in 1959, stood unsuccessfully for Parliament as the Labour candidate for West Flintshire. He was junior counsel at the Aberfan Inquiry in 1966, and junior prosecuting counsel at the trial of the Moors murderers, Ian Brady and Myra Hindley. He took Silk to become Queen's Counsel in 1969. In 1970–71, he chaired an inquiry into government policy on rabies prevention, which recommended stringent controls on the import of cats and dogs into Britain. He became a High Court judge in 1978, and was knighted the same year. He sat initially in the Family Division and later, from 1988, in the Queen’s Bench Division where he presided over Ken Dodd's trial in 1989.

After his retirement in 1996, he was appointed to chair the Tribunal of Inquiry established by the Secretary of State for Wales, William Hague, into allegations of hundreds of cases of child abuse in care homes in Clwyd and Gwynedd between 1974 and 1990. The inquiry began in January 1997 and sat for 203 days, hearing evidence from more than 650 people. Waterhouse kept handwritten notes throughout the trial, ensuring that they were summarised in his report. His final report ran to more than a thousand pages, and was published in February 2000, as Lost in Care. It proposed a series of radical changes to the ways in which the needs of children in care were addressed; all of its 72 recommendations were implemented. However, the Inquiry was later criticised for the narrowness of its remit, which meant that claims of abuse by politicians and others outside the care home system, which were raised by some participants, were not considered. In view of the concerns raised, the Home Secretary, Theresa May, announced on 6 November 2012 that Mrs Justice Julia Macur would head a review into the "scope and conduct" of the Waterhouse Inquiry in the light of claims that it examined only a fraction of the abuse that went on.

Waterhouse was also president of the International Eisteddfod at Llangollen from 1994 to 1997, and between 2000 and 2005 chaired the Independent Supervisory Authority on Hunting. He continued his support for promoting the rights of children in care and became Patron of Welsh children's charity Voices From Care.

His memoir Child of Another Century: Recollections of a High Court Judge was published by IB Tauris in 2013.

== Personal life and death ==
He married Sarah Selina Ingram in 1960 and had three children. He died on his 85th birthday in 2011. Lady Waterhouse died in 2021.
