= Al-Aqsa Spannmål =

Swedish branch of al-Aqsa Foundation

Al Aqsa Spannmål Stiftelse ("al-Aqsa Grain Foundation"), also known in Arabic as Sanabil al-Aqsa, is the Swedish branch of the al-Aqsa Foundation, an international charitable organization with alleged ties to the militant Palestinian movement Hamas. It has its office located at Nobelvägen 79 in Malmö.

In May 2003 United States authorities urged in a letter to Swedish authorities to freeze the assets of the organisation, which they claimed was providing money for Hamas. Swedish police conveyed a preliminary investigation, but this was eventually closed due to lack of evidence. The foundation has denied having any relations to Hamas or charges of terrorism, saying that they only acts as a charity for Palestinian widows and orphaned children.

On October 24, 2006, the chairman of the foundation, Khalid al-Yousef, was arrested by the Swedish Security Service and charged with planning of terrorism (Swedish: förberedelse till terroristbrott), serious planning of public destruction (Swedish: grov förberedelse till allmänfarlig ödeläggelse) and serious offences to the Swedish law on financing (Swedish: grovt brott mot finansieringslagen). He was released from custody after three days, in lack of evidence.

The organization is currently blacklisted by FRII, Swedish Fundraising Council (Swedish: Frivilligorganisationernas Insamlingsråd).
