= Disappearance of Trevaline Evans =

Unsolved disappearance case

Coordinates: 52.9688781°N 3.1655238°W

Trevaline Evans
- Born: 6 September 1937
- Disappeared: 16 June 1990 (aged 52); Llangollen, Denbighshire, Wales
- Status: Missing for 36 years and 4 months
- Occupation: Antiques Shop Worker
- Known for: Unsolved Disappearance
- Spouse: Richard Evans

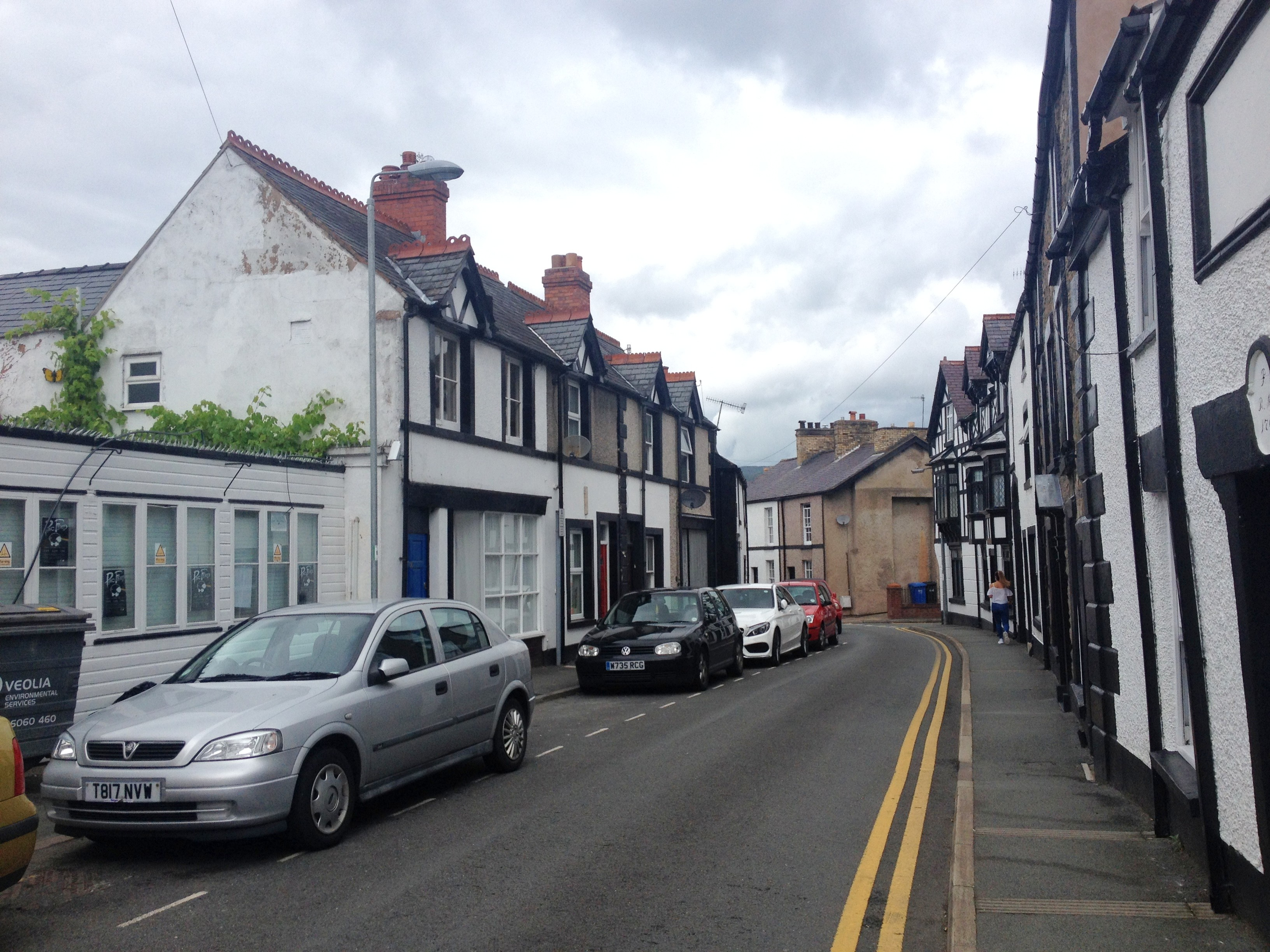
East end of Church Street, Llangollen

The disappearance of Trevaline Evans is a missing persons case from 1990, concerning a 52-year-old woman who vanished without a trace from her antiques shop in Llangollen, Denbighshire, Wales.

== Events leading up to the disappearance ==
Evans had been away during the week of her disappearance near the coast at Rhuddlan with her husband Richard, who was renovating the couple's holiday bungalow. She returned to Llangollen on Wednesday, 13 June.

== Day of the disappearance ==
On Saturday, 16 June 1990, Evans opened her shop, Attic Antiques on Church Street, at the usual time of 9:30am. She had parked her dark blue Ford Escort estate 200 yards away. During the morning, approximately 25 friends and customers had called in and, according to the friends who visited, Evans had appeared relaxed and happy, even having made plans to go out that night. The weather that day was sunny according to the police, and the town centre described as busy.

At about 12:40pm, Evans left a note on the front door of her shop, saying she would be "back in two minutes". A smartly dressed man was reportedly seen talking to her in the shop shortly before she left the note. This man was never traced. It is known that she bought an apple and a banana and was seen crossing nearby Castle Street. As a banana skin was found in a dustbin in the shop after this time, it is thought she must have returned there. However, this has never been confirmed. Evans’s handbag, car keys and jacket, along with fruit and flowers that she had intended to take home, were left behind in the shop. Her car remained parked where it had been left.

The last confirmed sighting of Evans was near her home on Market Street at 2:30pm.

There were two more suspected sightings, both unconfirmed. At 2:35pm a woman matching her description was seen walking out of town along the A5 towards Corwen, beside the riverside park. At 3:45pm, there was another sighting, this time of a woman walking into Park Avenue from the direction of the River Dee.

== Investigation ==
Every household in Llangollen, as well as scores of people from further afield, were interviewed. More than 1,500 names were checked, and about 700 cars were eliminated from the inquiry. Searches of the River Dee, the canal, mine shafts and caves in the Llangollen area were carried out, but no trace of Evans was found. An artist's impression of a man in a blazer apparently seen in her company was drawn up and circulated during the investigation in 1990.

In January 2001, the case was reopened by police in the hope new forensic techniques would suggest fresh evidence. Evans's husband Richard was arrested in June 2001 but later released without charge. Police also ruled out the previously published artist's impression of a man allegedly seen with Evans shortly before her disappearance as no longer accurate.

== Subsequent events ==
The case was re-examined in 2010 on the 20th anniversary of Evans's disappearance. In September 2011 it was reported that police were looking into a possible connection between Evans's disappearance and a convicted serial killer named Robin Ligus. Ligus served a life sentence for the murders of three men in 1994, and died in 2022. In January 2012, however, police ruled out any possible connection.

Apparent sightings of Evans have been reported in London, France (with Interpol investigating the assumed sighting there), and a remote town in Australia. In 1992, woodland in the World’s End area was searched after a tip off from someone claiming to be a 'spiritualist medium'. In 1993, police sniffer dogs searched a canal bank near Llangollen after a woman wrote to police stating that she had been ‘overwhelmed’ by a feeling that Trevaline was nearby.

No money was ever taken from her bank account, indicating to police that she may have been abducted and murdered.

== In popular culture ==
External videos
- YouTube videos
- In the Footsteps of Killers Series 2 Episode 6

Evans' disappearance was the subject of a 2021 Crime+ Investigation podcast. The episode, titled The disappearance of Trevaline Evans: North Wales, was published as a part of the podcast series spin-off to the documentary show Murdertown.

In 2023, a Channel 4 documentary, In the Footsteps of Killers, suggested a link between her disappearance and Christopher Halliwell, the double murderer of Sian O'Callaghan and Becky Godden-Edwards, though this was unproven.

== See also ==
- List of people who disappeared mysteriously (2000–present)
- Murder of Lindsay Rimer
- Disappearance of Suzy Lamplugh
