= Al-Aqsa Foundation =

International charitable organization (est. 1991)

Al-Aqsa International Foundation
- Formation: 1991
- Type: NGO
- Legal status: Foundation
- Headquarters: Aachen, Germany (until 2002)
- Region served: Worldwide
- Website: http://www.al-aqsa.nl/
- Remarks: The group has been designated as a terrorist organization by the European Union, Australia, Canada, the UAE, the United Kingdom and the United States.

The al-Aqsa Foundation (originally named Al-Aqsa E.V.) is an entity established in 1991 as a non-profit organisation that some Western governments have said is linked to Hamas. In 2003 the U.S. Treasury Department designated the foundation as a "Specially Designated Global Terrorist (SDGT) entity."

The head office of the foundation was located in Germany until it was closed by the German authorities in July 2002. The organisation is known to have local branch offices in the Netherlands, Denmark, Belgium, Sweden, Pakistan, South Africa, Yemen and elsewhere.

== Aims ==
On its website, al-Aqsa Foundation states that it is a non-political organization “providing for the religious, cultural and social needs of the poor and needy Palestinians living within the West Bank, Gaza, Lebanon and Jordan.”

The foundation claims to be working only with “bona fide organizations that are duly registered with the appropriate local authorities.”

== Alleged ties with militant groups ==
Al-Aqsa foundation does not acknowledge any association with Hamas or other militant organizations. However several ties between the foundation and these organizations have been asserted.

Based on the U.S. federal indictment against al-Moayad, in 2003 the cleric traveled to Germany to meet Mohamed Alanssi, a Federal Bureau of Investigation (FBI) informant, and an FBI undercover agent. Al-Moayad was recorded by the FBI at a Frankfurt hotel while promising to funnel about $2 million to Hamas, and was eventually arrested by the German police at the request of the FBI.

The legal proceedings also describe a 2002 meeting at which the cleric provided receipts to confirm the financial support of the Yemeni branch of the Al-Aqsa Foundation to the jihadist cause.

In particular, al-Moayad provided receipts from Interpal and three other organizations. Interpal is a UK-based charity which the U.S. government has accused of supporting terrorism and the UK Charity Commission has investigated several times based on alleged links between the charity and organizations involved in terrorism, but none of the accusations have been substantiated. Interpal is a member of the Union of Good, an umbrella organization consisting of over 50 Islamic charities and funds which funnel money to organizations belonging to Hamas. The U.S. Office of Foreign Assets Control designated the Union of Good as a terrorist entity in 2008. However, the British High Court found it is libellous in July 2010 to state that Interpal supported Hamas. The most recent records available feature Al-Aqsa foundation and its Yemeni branch, listed as “Al-Aqsa Islamic Charitable Society Yemen,” as members of the Union of Good as well.

In general, the Al-Aqsa Foundation's contribution to Hamas and its cause were well known to Hamas affiliates. In his book “Hamas. Politics, Charity and Terrorism in the Service of Jihad” Matthew Levitt reports that the FBI recorded a telephone conversation between Abdelhaleem Ashqar and the then-Hamas representative to Yemen Mohammed Siyam in which ali Muqbil is described as the person in charge of “charity work at the office.”

Al-Aqsa Foundation's Swedish branch was also the conduit to channel funds from the Norway-based Islamic League to Hamas. The U.S. Treasury pointed out that at the Islamic League of Norway's annual conference held on May 18 and 19, 2002 the General Secretary of the Islamic League in Sweden reiterated the importance to support financially Al-Aqsa Foundation in Sweden, which he claimed would have contributed to the destruction of Israel.

== Terrorist designations and sanctions ==
The al-Aqsa Foundation has been designated as a terrorist organization by the European Union, Australia, Canada, the UAE, the United Kingdom and the United States. The group has been described by the United States as a "critical part of Hamas' transnational terrorist support infrastructure" and has said that it "uses humanitarian relief as cover to provide support to the Hamas terrorist organization". Hamas is designated by the U.S. Secretary of State as a Foreign Terrorist Organization (66 Fed. Reg. 51088) and as Specially Designated Global Terrorist (SDGT) under Executive Order 13224, "Blocking Property and Prohibiting Transactions with Persons Who commit, Threaten to Commit, or Support Terrorism." According to the U.S., Hamas is known to raise at least tens of millions of dollars per year throughout the world using charitable fundraising as cover.

In May 2003 the al-Aqsa Foundation was designated by the United States Department of the Treasury as a Specially Designated Global Terrorist (SDGT) entity under Executive Order 13224. As a result of this designation, all assets of the al-Aqsa Foundation are blocked and transactions with the organization are illegal. Other nations, including the Netherlands, Germany, Denmark, the United Kingdom, Luxembourg and Switzerland, have also taken action against the al-Aqsa Foundation.

Germany banned the group in 2002, with Federal Minister of Interior Otto Schily accusing it of promoting terrorism and violence and supporting Hamas through a network of seemingly unsuspecting aid organizations. One included a kindergarten where orphans of suicide bombers were trained in weapons. The group's appeal of the ban was denied by the Federal Administrative Court in Leipzig in 2004.

In April 2003, the Netherlands Minister of Foreign Affairs sanctioned Stichting Al-Aqsa, in a measure repealed by the General Court in September 2010.

== Offices ==
Head office:

- Aachen, Germany

Branch offices:

- Rotterdam, Netherlands
- Copenhagen, Denmark
- Brussels, Belgium
- Sanaa, Yemen
- Malmö, Sweden (see Al Aqsa Spannmål Stiftelse)
- Johannesburg, South Africa
- Islamabad, Pakistan
