= Rebecca Television =

British investigative journalism website

Rebecca Television was a British investigative journalism website originally launched in April 2010. The site combined investigative journalism in traditional written article format and video reports. The website was a subscription-based news source independent of advertising or sponsorship. Rebecca Television's editor, Paddy French, was a current affairs producer with British broadcaster ITV Wales for ten years before founding the website.

Its first major story covered a Masonic directory naming over 10,000 Freemasons in Wales as part of a campaign to publish the names of all Freemasons in England and Wales. The story also examined the role of Freemasonry in a series of child abuse investigations.

== Rebecca Magazine ==
French originally started Rebecca as "a radical magazine for Wales" in the 1970s. The title takes its name from the Rebecca Riots that took place in South and Mid Wales in the 19th century.

The magazine's reputation was based on a sustained critique of the Labour party in Wales. A series of reports eventually led to the creation of its "Corruption Supplement" in 1975. Fourteen local politicians and businessmen named in its pages went to prison following an investigation by two police forces. They included two leaders of Swansea City Council.

Rebecca articles have been picked up by national newspapers, including The Sunday Times. The magazine was also involved in the making of anti-corruption documentaries by the BBC's "Man Alive" and Thames Television's "This Week" programs.

In its eight years of printing, there were eleven issues that circumvented its success. Circulation issues, hampered by the refusal of mainstream distributors to handle the title, climbed to 10,000.

Rebecca closed in 1982 after an attempt to produce a monthly title with a full-time staff failed and later relaunched as a website in 2010.

In 2013, ITV demanded Rebecca Television to withdraw the publication of an interview with Ron Jones, chairman of Tinopolis.

== Press Gang ==
The media work of Rebecca Television was taken over by Press Gang. Both Rebecca Television and Press Gang are edited by Paddy French.

In 2022 Press Gang editor Paddy French was ordered to pay libel damages to journalist John Ware.
