= Mold Law Courts =

Judicial building in Mold, Wales

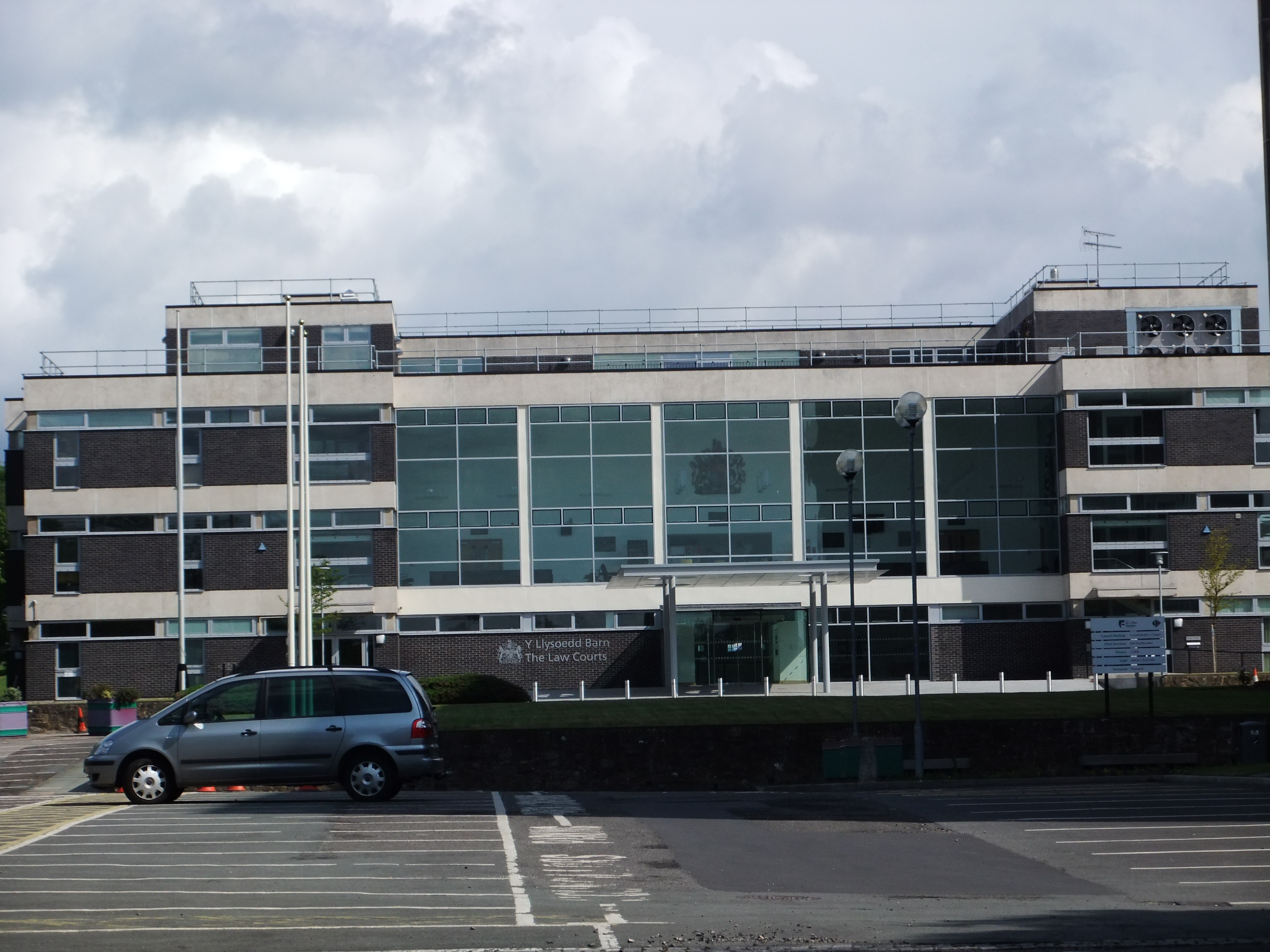
- Mold Law Courts

- Shown in Flintshire
- 53.1770°N 3.1372°W
- Location: Raikes Lane, Mold

History
- Built: 1969

Site notes
- Architect: Robert Harvey
- Architectural style: Modernist style

Mold Law Courts is a Crown Court venue, which deals with criminal cases, as well as a County Court venue, which deals with civil cases, in Raikes Lane, Mold, Flintshire, Wales.

== History ==
During much of the 19th and 20th centuries, criminal court hearings took place at the old County Hall in Chester Street in Mold which was completed in 1834. The old County Hall was slightly damaged by bullet marks during the Mold Riots in 1869. However, as the number of court cases in Mold grew, it became necessary to commission a more modern courthouse for both Crown Court hearings and County Court hearings. The site selected by the Lord Chancellor's Department, which was just north of the new County Hall, formed part of the Llwynegrin Hall estate which had been acquired for the purpose of building the County Hall and associated buildings. (Note: Llwynegrin Hall, which was designed by Thomas Jones of Chester in the Tudor style for Philip Davies Cooke of Gwysaney, was completed in 1830.)

The new Law Courts building was designed by the county architect, Robert Harvey, in the Modernist style, built in blue brick with Portland stone banding, and was completed in October 1969. The design involved a symmetrical main frontage of eleven bays facing onto Raikes Lane. The central section of five bays featured a glass doorway flanked by brickwork on either side, with sheet glazing on the two floors above. The end sections of three bays each, which were projected forward, were fenestrated with narrow casement windows in the outer bays and wide casement windows in the inner bays. There was also an attic floor which was finished in a similar style and contained the air conditioning and other equipment. Internally the building was laid out with three courtrooms. Works of art installed in the building included a wall sculpture by Jonah Jones.

Notable cases have included the trial and conviction of Mark Bridger, in May 2013, for the murder of April Jones. They also included the trial and conviction of the owner of three children's residential homes, John Allen, in November 2014, for charges in connection with the North Wales child abuse scandal.
