= Union of Good =

Saudi-based umbrella organization

- ائتلاف الخير
- Abbreviation: UG
- Formation: May 2001
- Headquarters: Saudi Arabia

The Union of Good (UG; Arabic: ائتلاف الخير, Itilaf al-Khayr or Ittilaf al-Kheir), also known as the Charity Coalition, is an umbrella organization consisting of over 50 Islamic charities and funds which allegedly "funnels" money to organizations belonging to Hamas, which currently rules the territory of the Gaza Strip. Hamas, which characterizes itself as an "Islamic resistance movement against Israeli occupation", which itself started as a charity.

The Union of Good was founded in May 2001 and is based in Saudi Arabia. It was blocked by Israel from operating in the West Bank and Gaza in 2002, then banned in 2008. The United States Treasury designates the Union of Good as supporting terrorism under Executive Order 13224 in November 2008.

== Organizational structure ==
The Union is chaired by Yusuf Al-Qaradawi, an Islamist cleric close to the Muslim Brotherhood. Immediately after the outbreak of the Al-Aqsa Intifada, in October 2000, he established the Union of Good with the involvement of Hamas leadership to fund a "Campaign of 101 Days" with the purpose of aiding Palestinians in the PA-administered territories. Following its initial success, the Union of Good was institutionalized and has been active ever since.

The Union of Good is composed of individuals and foundations proven to be Hamas-affiliated as well as designated extremist and terrorist around the world. According to the information made available by a 2005 report published by the Intelligence and Terrorism Information Center at the Center for Special Studies (C.S.S), the Union has served as a contractor to transfer funds for Hamas institutions in the territories administered by the Palestinian Authority.

The report pointed out that the UG divided the territories in four administrative districts in order to maximize its efficiency in transferring funds. In three districts (“North West Bank,” “Center West Bank,” and “South West Bank”), UG established or consolidated its affiliation with a designated organization serving as coordinator for a number of Hamas institutions active locally. Al-Tadhamoun, based in Nablus, is the coordinating organization for UG in the Northern district, while Al-Islah, in Ramallah, runs Hamas’ activities in Central West Bank and Hebron’s Islamic Charitable Society operates in the Southern district. In the fourth district, corresponding to the “Gaza Strip,” UG operated instead as an independent representative.

== Member organizations ==
According to the Israeli government, following are some of the societies and funds that form the Coalition:

- International Islamic Relief Organization, IIRO (Saudi Arabia)
- Holy Land Foundation for Relief and Development (US)
- Al-Aqsa Islamic Charitable Society Yemen, headed by Mohammed Ali Hassan Al-Moayad
- Interpal (UK)
- IHH (İnsani Yardım Vakfı) (Turkey)
- "Palästinensische Vereinigung in Österreich, PVOE" /"Palästinensischer Humanitärer Verein, PHV" (Austria)
- World Assembly of Muslim Youth
- al-Aqsa Foundation

Interpal (The Palestinian Relief and Development Fund), headquartered in the United Kingdom, is believed to be acting as a representative for Union of Good in Europe. Interpal is based in a building - Pinnacle House on Old Oak Common Lane in West London – very close to two other buildings - Westgate House and Crown House - that a recent analysis by The Telegraph has identified as the main hub for the Muslim Brotherhood and Hamas’ operations in Europe. According to The Telegraph, the seventh floor of Westgate House houses the Muslim Charities Forum, an umbrella body for 10 British charities, six of which “are or were members of Union of Good.”

Interpal was designated a terrorist entity by the U.S. Department of the Treasury in August 2003. Not only Interpal was originally listed as a major donation point for Union of Good; many of the Union of Good pages have listed Interpal telephone numbers as designated contact numbers. Union of Good maintained for a while its English pages on an Interpal domain. Moreover, NEPA emphasized that the managing trustee of Interpal, Essam Yusuf, was the initial Executive Manager of Union of Good and the Secretary General of the Union of Good at the time of its designation by the U.S. Department of the Treasury. As of mid-2007, Yusuf served on the Hamas executive committee under Hamas leader Khaled Misha'al.

In 2009 the Charity Commission for England and Wales, after an investigation, ordered Interpal to dissociate itself from membership of Union of Good. In a follow-up in 2012 the Charities Commission concluded that Interpal had complied with that order. Israel and the Nine Eleven Finding Answers Foundation also believe it is linked to other organisations. However, a number of commentators have claimed that Yusuf continues to play a central role in Union of Good.

Palästinensische Vereinigung in Österreich is among the organizations which U.S. Treasury defined as “the primary financiers of Union of Good projects” in 2008. Among these latter, the U.S. Treasury also listed: the “Commite de Bienfaisance et de Secours aux Palestiniens” (CBSP), based in France, and a related Swiss association, “The Association de Secours Palestinien” (ASP); “The Sanabil Association for Relief and Development,” based in Lebanon. These associations were all designated as terrorist entities for their relation to Hamas in 2003 as well.

A recent analysis published by The NEFA Foundation highlighted that a 2007 UG website contained a list of 54 participating organizations in the Middle East, Europe and Africa.

== Activities ==
According to U.S. Treasury, Union of Good’s primary purpose is to strengthen Hamas’ political and military position in the West Bank and Gaza. The organization has primarily covered for Hamas financial transfers by diverting charitable donations to support Hamas members. Some of the funds transferred have been used to aid the families of suicide bombers fighting Israeli forces and imprisoned Hamas members.

The organization has provided funding to Hamas charities in the Gaza Strip for food packages, school-equipment, civic buildings and other charitable services. The humanitarian projects are carried out through affiliated institutions and improve Hamas’ status among the population, allegedly “helping Hamas to present itself as a potential radical Islamic alternative to the more secular-oriented Palestinian Authority.”

Arab Bank has been identified by multiple sources as the leading financial institution in the transfer of funds to Hamas and other Palestinian terrorist organizations. In 2014 a US jury found the bank liable for financing terrorism by processing transactions for Hamas’ members and affiliated organizations. On 15 August 2015 Arab Bank reached a settlement with hundreds of American plaintiffs who had filed a lawsuit against the bank under the Anti-Terrorism Act.

== Terrorism designation ==
The Union of Good is designated by the U.S. Office of Foreign Assets Control as a Specially Designated Global Terrorist group, which allows the US to block the assets of foreign individuals and entities that commit, or pose a significant risk of committing, acts of terrorism.

According to the U.S. Department of the Treasury, “the Union of Good's executive leadership and board of directors includes Hamas leaders, Specially Designated Global Terrorists (SDGTs), and other terrorist supporters.” The UG has in fact brokered several organizations and charities previously designated as terrorist entities for providing support to Hamas and Hamas-affiliated organizations in the West Bank and Gaza.

One of his founding members, Yusuf Al-Qaradawi, has been banned from entering the U.S., France and the U.K. for his alleged ties to terrorist organizations.

Another board member of the Union of Good is the U.S. terrorist designated Abd al-Majid al-Zindani, a well-known Yemen-based Hamas fundraiser, a loyalist to Bin Laden and supporter of al-Qaeda.
