= Interpal =

British Pro-Palestinian charity organization and fund

- Founded: November 1994
- Type: Humanitarian
- Purpose: Medical, education and community
- Location: London, England
- Region served: Palestine, Jordan and Lebanon
- Method: Direct Aid / Program Funding
- Key people: Ibrahim Hewitt
- Revenue: £5,335,082 (2010)
- Website: www.interpal.org

Interpal is the working name for Palestinian Relief and Development Fund, a British charity founded in 1994 that describes itself as a non-political charity to alleviate problems faced by Palestinians, and focused solely on the provision of relief and development aid to the poor and needy Palestinians the world over, but primarily in the Palestinian territories, Lebanon and Jordan.

The US government has alleged that Interpal is funding or supporting terrorism, and American citizens and permanent residents are prohibited from doing business with them because of a listing as a Specially Designated Nationals in 2003.

The UK Charity Commission has conducted three inquiries into Interpal and each inquiry has cleared it of wrongdoing and misuse of funds. In 2009, Interpal was ordered by the Charity Commission to end its links with Union of Good, which had been designated by the U.S. Treasury as "an organisation created by Hamas leadership to transfer funds to the terrorist organisation." By 2012, the Commission reported that Interpal had complied with the order. The High Court in London in July 2010 found it libellous to state that Interpal supported Hamas.

== Mission and values ==
Interpal was founded in the wake of the Oslo Accords. It states that its "passion for justice and the preservation of human dignity commits [it] to helping Palestinians in need". Interpal works closely with partners in Palestine, Lebanon and Jordan, with the aim of "moving the poor and needy in its areas of operation away from the culture of dependency and encourage a culture of self-sufficiency, and to promote peace and stability within the communities to which the beneficiaries belong".

On its website, Interpal states that due to the volatile situation in the occupied territories, the organisation transfers funds to local authorised partners and allows goods and supplies to be purchased within the area. This has led to accusations of Interpal funds reaching illegal and terrorist organisations.

== Work ==
Interpal works in the occupied Palestinian territories of Gaza and the West Bank as well as the refugee camps in Jordan and Lebanon. Previously it conducted the majority of its work through partner organisations based locally to "provide aid and revitalise the local economy at the same time". It now operates mainly through its local office in Gaza which deals with funding proposals and disburses funds directly to projects.

Interpal has four main areas of focus:

1) Emergency Humanitarian Aid: Interpal provide humanitarian assistance by delivering food, water, shelter, clothing and medical aid year round. They also run other schemes such as sponsorship of orphans and seasonal support during Ramadan and Qurbani periods of the Islamic year.

2) Medical Assistance: Support is provided to establish new health clinics and to improve existing facilities that are overstretched. Interpal also provides medical equipment and supplies to those in need.

3) Educational Support: Interpal dedicates significant attention and funds to keeping children and young adults in education as part of their commitment to educating and empowering individuals in Palestine. This involves financial assistance to schools and universities as well as support for the neediest of pupils.

4) Community Development: Interpal state that self-sufficiency is key to alleviating poverty and fostering community development; they support orphanages, welfare centres and the protection of sites of religious and cultural significance to aid the creation of a sustainable Palestinian community.

== Fundraising ==
The charity organises several events throughout the year, including charity bazaars, university talks, auctions, and fundraising dinners. Other annual campaigns include Ramadan and Qurbani appeals.

Interpal has a number of successful fundraising channels in addition to its mail and online campaigns. Tens of thousands of people in the UK make a regular financial contribution towards its work and many thousands more sponsor orphans and needy children on a regular giving scheme. Funds are received from mosque and street collections and through live TV appeals. Interpal also receives funds for providing and organising volunteer stewards at events such as IslamExpo and Global Peace and Unity.

== UK Charity Commission inquiries ==
Interpal has on three occasions, following allegations, been the subject of investigations by the Charity Commission for England and Wales. In all three investigations evidence was not found to prove alleged links between Interpal and organisations involved in terrorism.

=== 1996 inquiry ===
In 1996 allegations were made against Interpal and its Trustees in the Sunday Telegraph. A Charity Commission inquiry found no evidence that donations could not be accounted for or were made for political reasons. Subsequently, the Telegraph issued the following apology and retraction on 29 November 1997:

"On 26 May 1996, in an article entitled "London fatwa backs suicide bombers", we suggested that the Palestinian Relief and Development Fund (INTERPAL) was run by Hamas activists who encourage and support terrorist activities in Israel. We also reported claims which were being investigated by the Charity Commission that INTERPAL was used to raise money to fund the training of suicide bombers in Gaza and the West Bank. We now accept that the Trustees of INTERPAL are not Hamas activists. We also accept that the Charity Commission's investigations found there to be no evidence of any pro-terrorist bias in the charity or of any channelling of its funds towards the training of suicide bombers. The Commission concluded that the charity is a "well run and committed organisation which carries out important work in a part of the world where there is great hardship and suffering" and that INTERPAL takes every possible step to ensure that its donations go only to charitable purposes, helping the poor and needy. We withdraw the allegations that appeared in our article and apologise to the Trustees of INTERPAL for the embarrassment caused."

=== 2003 inquiry ===
On August 22, 2003 the United States Department of the Treasury published a list of six individuals and five charities it alleged to have links to Hamas and terrorism. The list included Interpal. It described all as "Specially Designated Global Terrorists." The Treasury Department's Office of Foreign Assets Control put them all on a list of individuals and organisations with whom United States citizens and permanent residents are prohibited from doing business. A few weeks later, after a full investigation, the British Charity Commission cleared Interpal of any illegal activities, finding the U.S. Treasury did not provide evidence to support their allegations, and unfroze its assets.

After the Board of Deputies of British Jews repeated this allegation, it was sued by Interpal. The parties settled out of court, with the Board of Deputies making a public apology and posting the statement on its website for 28 days. The statement on their Web-site concluded:

..We referred to “terrorist organisations such as Hamas and Interpal”. We would like to make it clear that we should not have described Interpal in this way and we regret the upset and distress our item caused.

=== 2006 to 2009 inquiry ===
In July 2006 the BBC broadcast a Panorama programme, "Faith, Hate and Charity", alleging that Interpal donated funds to voluntary organisations in the Palestinian territories that supported the ideology of Hamas.

The head of the Charity Commission said on the Panorama programme that the presenting journalist had raised some "pertinent" issues concerning the organisation's links to Hamas that should be investigated. On 4 January 2007 the Commission "reiterated its 1996 conclusion that Interpal is 'a well run and committed organisation which carries out important work in a part of the world where there is great hardship and suffering'."

After an extended investigation, in February 2009 the Charity Commission report dismissed allegations by Panorama that Interpal was funding organisations involved in terrorism. Again the U.S. Treasury did not supply any evidence to the Charity Commission inquiry, though the Israeli government did provide an outline of its concerns. However the inquiry concluded that Interpal "had not put in place adequate due diligence and monitoring procedures to be satisfied that these organisations were not promoting terrorist ideologies or activities. Where procedures were in place, they were not sufficient nor fully implemented". The inquiry concluded that they "could not verify that the material it examined suggesting certain partner organisations funded by the charity may be promoting terrorist ideology or activities."

Interpal was ordered by the Charity Commission to end its links to The Union of Good, which had been designated by the U.S. Treasury as "an organisation created by Hamas leadership to transfer funds to the terrorist organisation." In May 2010 the Charity Commission found Interpal to be in full compliance with directions.

=== Supplement to the 2006-2009 inquiry ===
A supplemental report was issued in 2012 by the Charity Commission to describe the actions that Interpal had taken to comply with the recommendations of the 2009 inquiry. Interpal was reported to have complied with the requirements of the 2009 inquiry. Interpal was no longer a member of the Union for Good. The trustee linked to the Union for Good had resigned as General Secretary of that organisation. Although Interpal did have to request an extension of the deadline given by the Charity Commission, it had by June 2012 published a Partnership and Funding Operations Manual that set out procedures that would effectively address the failings reported in the 2009 inquiry. The Commission said that it was the responsibility of the trustees to continue to monitor the issues raised by the inquiry.

== Legal actions brought by Interpal ==
On 2 July 2006, The Jerusalem Post issued an apology to Interpal regarding a defamatory article it published.

In 2005 Interpal won a libel case against the Board of Deputies of British Jews which two years earlier had denounced Interpal as a terrorist organisation on its website. The Board of Deputies issued a retraction and apology as part of a confidential out-of-court settlement. In its statement the Board of Deputies said "We would like to make it clear that we should not have described Interpal in this way and we regret the upset and distress our item caused".

In 2006 the Jerusalem Post was forced to apologise to Interpal and its bank NatWest for an article in which the paper claimed the charity was connected to a terrorist organisation.

In July 2010 Express Newspapers apologised to Interpal and agreed to pay £60,000 plus its lawyer Carter-Ruck’s legal costs in settlement. Interpal had sued the Daily Express over a website article from December 2009 which claimed Interpal was linked to the Palestinian organisation Hamas. The Express accepted that the allegations were false.

In August 2018 the Daily Mail published an article accusing Interpal of funding a "hate festival" in Palestine. In a separate article in the same month the Mail Online described Interpal as a "specially designated global terrorist organisation". Interpal received damages of £120,000 and its legal costs from the Daily Mail and Mail Online as a result of the articles. The paper also issued a correction to the articles in April 2019 and apologised saying it accepted that "neither Interpal, nor its trustees, have ever been involved in or provided support for terrorist activity of any kind". In response to the settlement and apology Ibrahim Hewitt, the chairman of Interpal’s trustees, said "The timing and amount of the settlement are particularly noteworthy within the context of the ongoing wider agenda to politicise humanitarian aid to Palestinians. We hope that this significant success will encourage commentators and others to take seriously their responsibility for reporting unbiased, accurate information to the general public and service providers".

In August 2019, Interpal received an apology and damages of £50,000 from The Jewish Chronicle which had implied in a March 2019 article that the charity had links to terrorist activity. On 23 August, the paper published the apology in full together with an article by Ibrahim Hewitt, chair of trustees of Interpal. In its apology the paper said it accepted that "neither Interpal, nor its trustees, have ever been involved with or provided support for terrorist activity of any kind".

== Designation as a terrorist organisation by Israel, the US, Australia and Canada ==
In May 1997, Israel declared Interpal to be an unlawful organisation.

In August 2003 the United States designated Interpal a Specially Designated Global Terrorist for allegedly supporting Hamas’ political and militant wing. A US Treasury spokesperson said at the time that: "Treasury designated Interpal for its support to the terrorist organisation, Hamas, which exploits the charitable sector to raise funds and cultivate support for its violent activities. Interpal was a principal charity used to hide the flow of money to Hamas". The US decision led to the second Charity Commission inquiry into Interpal in 2003. This inquiry cleared Interpal of wrongdoing and the commission said US authorities failed to provide evidence to back up its claims.

On 21 November 2003 Interpal was added to the Australian Department of Foreign Affairs and Trade Consolidated List, which lists "persons and entities subject to targeted financial sanctions or travel bans under Australian sanctions laws". As a result, Australians who deal with Interpal assets or provide an asset to Interpal are liable for up to 10 years’ imprisonment and a fine.

Canada also designated Interpal around the same time.

On 6 January 2006 the families of victims of suicide bombings in Israel filed a court case in the US against NatWest, Interpal’s bank at the time. The suit said NatWest had violated US anti-terrorism laws by allowing Interpal to raise funds on its website knowing the US government designated Interpal a terrorist organisation. The case has passed through a number of stages and was still active in 2019.

The decision of the US to designate Interpal a terrorist organisation has had an adverse financial effect on the charity. On 20 March 2007 Interpal’s bank accounts with NatWest were closed by the bank, which cited pressure from the US legal system as the reason. In 2008 the Islamic Bank of Britain (IBB) was instructed by its clearing bank, Lloyds TSB, to cease all dealings with Interpal and as a result closed Interpal’s accounts. IBB expressed full support for Interpal. HSBC and the Co-operative Bank have also refused Interpal accounts. The lack of normal banking services means that Interpal has no direct debit facility and donations can’t be made by credit card. Interpal can only handle cash donations at events and fundraisers through third parties.

== Miscellaneous ==
- On 15 January 2006 The Sunday Telegraph reported that Zvi Heifetz, then Israel's ambassador to London, would hold urgent talks with Ivan Lewis, the Economic Secretary to the Treasury and a Vice-Chair of Labour Friends of Israel, in order to demand action be taken against Interpal after George Galloway entered the reality television show Celebrity Big Brother UK to earn money for his charity of choice, Interpal. Interpal reacted to the claims by issuing a statement saying "Regrettably, there are many who want to stop the little charitable support we give from actually getting to needy Palestinians. We believe we are targets of the Israeli and US governments purely because we are a Muslim-run charity".
- In 2009 the Nine Eleven Finding Answers Foundation (NEFA) said that a link between Hamas and Interpal is indicated by a number of court cases in which individuals are alleged to have used money obtained from Interpal to fund terrorist operations. The first case involved Mohammed Ali Hasan Al-Moyad, chair of Al-Aqsa in Yemen who was convicted in 2005 for conspiring to funnel money to Hamas and al-Qaida. According to a U.S. federal indictment, he provided receipts from Interpal and three other organisations as proof of his support of jihad at a meeting in 2002. The second case was tried in Israel in 2003. It involved five individuals and two organisations which were accused of using funds which they received from Interpal and other organisations to support Hamas activities. In a plea agreement in 2005 all defendants pled guilty to the charges. The third case from 2005 was also tried in Israel. A military court charged a Hamas activist, Ahmed Salatna, with diverting £9 million from Interpal, Human Appeal International, French CBST, the Italian ABSPT and the Al-Aqsa Foundation to support the families of suicide bombers and to fund terrorist operations. One of the recipients is alleged to have been the family of "a young man who blew himself up at the Sbarro pizza restaurant in Jerusalem in August 2001, killing 15 people and wounding 107", an attack for which both Hamas and Islamic Jihad claimed responsibility.
