= Güneş (newspaper) =

Turkish newspaper

- Type: Daily newspaper
- Format: Berliner
- Owner: Star Media Group
- Founded: 19 February 1982
- Ceased publication: 2019
- Political alignment: Erdoganism
- Language: Turkish
- City: Zeytinburnu, Istanbul
- Country: Turkey
- Circulation: 91,000 (2013)
- Website: www.gunes.com

Güneş ("Sun" in Turkish) is a daily newspaper in Turkey. It was owned by Ethem Sancak's Star Media Group.

== History ==
Güneş was founded in 1982 by Ömer Çavuşoğlu and Ahmet Kozanoğlu. It was later bought by Asil Nadir.

Güneş was owned by the Çukurova Media Group (who acquired it from Güneri Cıvaoğlu) from 1996 to 2013. It was passed to the TMSF in settlement of debts owed to the Turkish government.

In 1997, Çukurova Group acquired the newspaper. In 2013, Savings Deposit Insurance Fund of Turkey seized the newspaper along with Akşam. Later, in October 2013, it was sold to Ethem Sancak.

In August 2017, Murat Sancak acquired the newspaper. On 31 December 2019, Güneş ceased daily circulation as a stand alone newspaper to become a sister publication of the Turkish newspaper Akşam.
