= Mehmet Ocaktan =

Turkish journalist

- Born: 8 June 1955 (age 71)

Mehmet Ocaktan (born 8 June 1955, Dursunbey, Balıkesir Province) is a Turkish journalist, and a former deputy for the Justice and Development Party (2007 to 2011). Since June 2013 he is the editor-in-chief of Akşam. Previous journalistic roles include being the founding editor of Yeni Şafak and the managing editor of Star.

== Career ==
Ocaktan has worked for the newspapers Yeni Devir, Tercüman and Güneş and was the founding editor of Yeni Şafak in 1994. He was a deputy in the Grand National Assembly of Turkey representing Bursa for the Justice and Development Party from 2007 to 2011, before returning to journalism at the Star newspaper.

In 2013 he became the editor of Akşam after the newspaper was acquired by the government's TMSF.

He has published three books of poetry.
