= Star Media Group =

Star Media Group may refer to:

- Daily News Brands, formerly known as Star Media Group, Canadian media organization
- Star Media Group Berhad, publisher of Malaysian newspaper The Star
- Star Media Group (Turkey), Turkish media group which owns the Star newspaper

== See also ==
- Star Media, former New Zealand media company
