= Sevilay =

Sevilay is a Turkish feminine given name. It is a compound word: Sevil (be loved) and Ay (Moon). Notable people with the name include:

- Sevilay İmamoğlu Öcal (born 1984), Turkish handball player
- Sevilay Öztürk (born 2003), Turkish Paralympic swimmer
- Sevilay Yılman (born 1973), Turkish journalist
