= İsmail Küçükkaya =

Turkish journalist, news anchor and writer

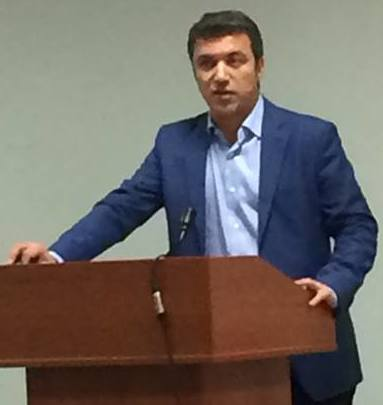
- Born: 20 January 1970 (age 55); Simav, Turkey
- Occupation(s): TV presenter, journalist, writer
- Years active: 1991–present
- Spouses: first wife (div. 2002) Eda Demirci (m. 2016; div. 2020)

İsmail Küçükkaya (born 20 January 1970) is a Turkish journalist, news anchor and writer.

== Life and career ==
İsmail Küçükkaya was born on 20 January 1970 to Yunus and Halise Küçükkaya in Simav, Kütahya. He finished his first and middle school education in Simav and in 1993 graduated from Gazi University with a degree in journalism. He divorced his first wife in 2002 and on 10 July 2016, he married Eda Demirci. Küçükkaya and Demirci divorced in January 2020. İsmail Küçükkaya, who presented Morning News of Fox between September 2013 and August 2022, has been presenting Morning News of Halk TV since September 2022.

İsmail Küçükkaya started his journalism career in 1991 as a reporter for Hürriyet newspaper. After working at Hürriyet, he worked for Sabah and Star newspapers. Küçükkaya started to work as a columnist for Akşam newspaper in 2000, and continued to write columns in 2003. He then became the Ankara representative of SkyTürk TV. He was also appointed as the Ankara representative of Akşam newspaper in 2005-2008 and became the newspaper's editor-in-chief in November 2008. He was dismissed after the Gezi Park protests in June 2013. In the same year, he started presenting his own morning program on Fox, titled İsmail Küçükkaya ile Çalar Saat. He was the moderator of the Istanbul 2019 Election Special debate, which was broadcast before the June 2019 Istanbul mayoral election.

== Bibliography ==
- Cumhuriyetimize Dair (2008)
- Cumhuriyet'in İlk Yüzyılı (2012; with İlber Ortaylı)
- Korkma (2016)
- Biraz Cesaret (2019)
- Fikri Hür Vicdanı Hür (2020)

== Awards and nominations ==
- Golden Butterfly Awards - Best Male News Presenter (2017; nominated)
- Turkey Golden Brand Awards - TV Presenter of the Year (2017; won)
- MGD Awards - Best Morning News Program (2018; won)
