= Tv4 (Turkish TV channel) =

Turkish television channel

tv4
- Country: Turkey
- Broadcast area: Turkey

Programming
- Picture format: 576i (SDTV); 1080i (HDTV)

Ownership
- Owner: Ethem Sancak
- Sister channels: 24; 360

History
- Launched: 2008 (EP TV); 10 May 2010 (Karamel TV); 8 July 2013 (tv4)

Links
- Website: tv4

Tv4 is a privately owned television channel in Turkey.

== History ==
It was first established in 2008 under the name EP TV as a channel broadcasting repeat programs of its sister channel 24. In 2010, it changed its name to Karamel TV as a "women's and children's channel". In addition to cartoons such as Carl², Cédric, Code Lyoko, Sonic Underground and The Adventures of Tintin, dramas such as Flight 29 Down and Zixx, Bollywood movies, yoga, pilates and cooking programs were broadcast here.

In 2013, Karamel TV was replaced by Tv4. The TV channel began to do block programming in the form of "Karamel block" for children, "Between Women" for Women, and later "TV for everyone". After a while, it changed its content and started broadcasting mostly Turkish cinema, game shows and cultural programs. The channel started broadcasting in HD in 2017, and changes were made to the logo in 2022.
