= 360 (TV channel) =

Turkish television channel

- Country: Turkey
- Broadcast area: Istanbul
- Headquarters: Tepeüstü, Küçükçekmece, Istanbul, Turkey

Programming
- Language: Turkish
- Picture format: 576i (16:9 SDTV); 1080i (HDTV)

Ownership
- Owner: Ethem Sancak
- Sister channels: 24, Tv4

History
- Launched: 31 Aralık 2013
- Former names: Skytürk (June 2002 - 23 January 2012); Skytürk 360 (23 January 2012 – 31 December 2013)

Links
- Website: www.tv360.com.tr

360 is a privately owned free-to-air television channel in Turkey.

== History ==
The channel was initially named Skytürk, from June 2002 until January 2012. On 23 January 2012, the name of the channel was changed to "Skytürk 360". On 31 December 2013, "Skytürk" was removed from the channel's name. On 1 December 2014, the format of the channel was changed to a national channel, as the new owners of the channel owned another news channel called 24.

Also, the "Skytürk" is not the Turkish version of Sky News. The company get a claim from Sky News due to use "Sky" name without their permission, in March 2006.

A sound bomb was thrown at the channel's headquarters in Belgradkapı, Zeytinburnu, Istanbul, on 22 October 2009, which was defused by the anti-bomb squad.

In June 2013 Skytürk was seized from Çukurova Holding by the government's Savings Deposit Insurance Fund over unpaid tax debts. In 2016 Skytürk was sold (together with newspaper Akşam and radio stations Best FM to Ethem Sancak.

== Slogan ==
- 6/2002-23/1/2012: Anlamak İçin (To Understand)
- 23/1/2012-11/2013: Olduğu Gibi Haber (News as it is)
- 11/2013-12/2014: Her Açıdan (From every Angle)
- 3/2015-5/2016: Hayatın Tamamı 360'ta (Whole of Life at 360)
- 5/2016-9/2016: 360 Ekranı Hayatın Tamamı (360 Screen Whole of Life)
- 9/2016-1/9/2017: Birlikte Çok Güzeliz (Much Beautiful Together)
- Since 1/9/2017: Yeni Nesil Yayıncılık (New Generation Broadcasting)
