= Sevilay Yılman =

Turkish journalist (born 1973)

- Born: 1973 (age 52–53); Malatya, Turkey
- Education: Istanbul University
- Occupation: Journalist
- Years active: 1994-present
- Children: 1

Sevilay Yılman (born 1973) is a Turkish journalist who has worked for various media outlets, including Sabah and Habertürk. She left Habertürk in April 2023 and has been working as a freelance journalist.

== Biography ==
Yılman was born in Malatya in 1973 into an Alevi family. She received a degree in journalism from Istanbul University in 1994. Following her graduation she joined Habertürk TV and worked as a presenter in different programs. Then she worked for Beyaz TV and began to contribute to the daily newspapers Star and Sabah. Later she joined the daily newspaper Habertürk. She announced in her column on 26 April 2023 that she were leaving Habertürk. She has been working as a freelance journalist and created a YouTube channel in May 2023.

In 1996 she married Mustafa Nihat Yükselir. They have a son and divorced in 2013.
