= Joseph Ciechanover =

Israeli diplomat and public servant (1933–2024)

- יוסף צ'חנובר
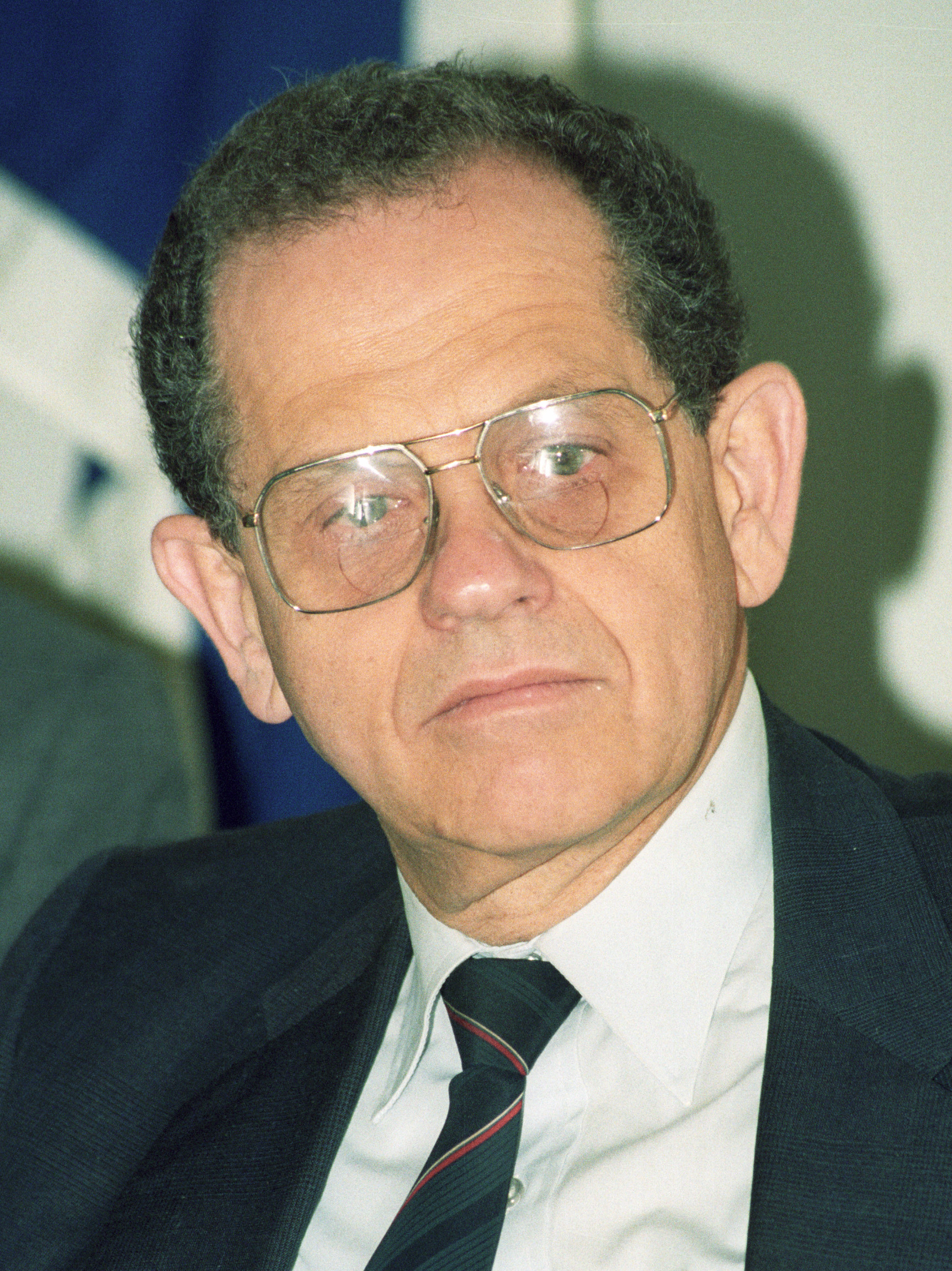
- Ciechanover in 1991
- Born: 1 October 1933; Haifa, Mandatory Palestine
- Died: 17 September 2024 (aged 90)
- Occupations: Diplomat, public servant
- Known for: Director General at the Ministry of Foreign Affairs of Israel
- Relatives: Aaron Ciechanover (brother)
- Awards: French Legion of Honour; Pentagon's Medal for Distinguished Service; Israel Prize for lifetime achievement (2021)

Joseph Ciechanover (Hebrew: יוסף צ'חנובר; 1 October 1933 – 17 September 2024) was an Israeli diplomat and public servant who was Director General at the Ministry of Foreign Affairs. He represented Israel at the UN Gaza Flotilla Panel. He was a recipient of the French Legion of Honour award as well as the Pentagon's Medal for Distinguished Service, had served as President of Challenge Funds, Chairman of the Board of Israel Discount Bank and as a member of the Bank of Israel Advisory Committee.

Ciechanover was Head of Israel's Defense Mission to the United States and Canada, and General Counsel to the Israel Ministry of Defense and Ministry of Agriculture. In 2021 he received the Israel Prize for lifetime achievement and contribution to Society and the state.

== Life and career ==
Ciechanover was born in Haifa to Yitzhak, a lawyer, and Bluma, an English teacher. His parents immigrated to Israel from Poland in the early 1930s and settled in Haifa. He grew up in the Hadar HaCarmel neighborhood. His younger brother is Nobel Laureate Prof. Aaron Ciechanover. In the 1950s and early 1960s, he studied at the Hebrew University of Jerusalem in three fields: education, law and business administration.

From 1960 to 1968, he was a lecturer in agricultural and administrative law at the Faculty of Agriculture of the Hebrew University of Rehovot. From 1966 to 1967 he studied law at the University of California, Berkeley. In 1991 he received a Ph.D. in Philosophy and Jewish Studies from Boston University.

Ciechanover died on 17 September 2024, at the age of 90.
