= Akşam =

Turkish newspaper

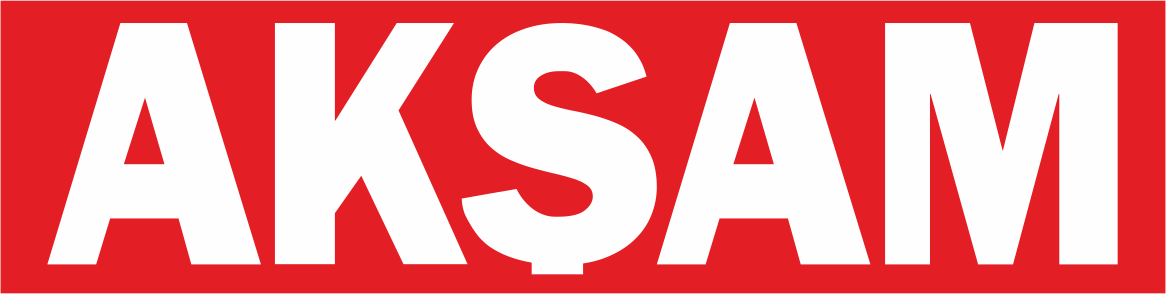
- Type: Daily newspaper
- Owner: TürkMedya (T Medya Yatırım San. ve Tic. AŞ.)
- Editor-in-chief: Mustafa Kartoğlu
- Founded: 20 September 1918
- Political alignment: Pro-AKP
- Language: Turkish
- City: Istanbul
- Country: Turkey
- Circulation: 103,000 (May 2013)
- Website: www.aksam.com.tr

Akşam (Evening) is a Turkish newspaper founded in 1918, owned by Zeki Yeşildağ's Türk Medya Grup (T Medya Yatırım San. ve Tic. AŞ.) since 2013. In 2013 it had a circulation of around 100,000.

== History ==
Akşam's founders in 1918 included Necmettin Sadak, Kazım Şinasi Dersan, Falih Rıfkı Atay and Ali Naci Karacan.

Former editors include Doğan Özgüden (1964–1966).

In 2010, former editor Semra Pelek and editorial manager Mustafa Dolu were charged in relation to reporting on the Ergenekon trials.

Akşam was owned by the Çukurova Media Group from 1997 to 2013, and previously by Mehmet Ali Ilıcak. It is currently owned by the Turkish government's TMSF. Shortly after it was acquired by the TMSF, a number of journalists were fired, with the former AKP deputy Mehmet Ocaktan replacing editor of five years İsmail Küçükkaya, and at least four journalists who had been critical of the government being fired.

On 19 July 2013 Akşam was sold (together with TV channel Sky Turk 360 and radio station Alem FM) to a Cengiz-Kolin-Limak joint venture for TL60m. In September 2013, Cengiz-Kolin-Limak withdrew from the attempt to buy Akşam. In October 2013, Akşam, TV channel Sky Turk 360, radio station Alem FM and Alem Magazine were sold to Ethem Sancak.

In August 2017, Zeki Yeşildağ acquired the newspaper as part of Es Yayıncılık.

== Books ==
- Kavaklı, Nurhan (2005), Bir gazetenin tarihi: Akşam ("History of a newspaper: Akşam"). Yapı Kredi Yayınları
