= Tevhit Karakaya =

Turkish politician (born 1955)

Tevhit Karakaya (born 1955, in Erzincan, Turkey) is a Turkish businessman and politician. He was elected MP in 1995 for the Welfare Party, in 1999 for its successor the Virtue Party, and in 2002 for the Justice and Development Party (AKP). He was a candidate for the AKP in 2007 but was not elected. In 2010 he acquired 50% of the Star Media Group.
