= MV Amalthea =

History
- Name: Amalthea
- Owner: A.C.A. Shipping Corp. (Greece)
- Port of registry: Giurgiulesti, Moldova
- Builder: Sanyo shipyard, Japan
- Completed: 1985
- Identification: ERJI
- Status: Under charter

General characteristics
- Class & type: General Cargo: single-decker
- Tonnage: 2822 (GT)
- Length: 91.6 m
- Beam: 15.6 m
- Draught: 6.2 m
- Depth: 7.45 m
- Installed power: 2300 bhp @ 180 rpm; (Akaska)
- Speed: Approx. 10 knots
- Capacity: 197,000 cubic feet; (Grain cargo capacity)

MV Amalthea (built 1985) is a Moldovan-flagged cargo ship owned by A.C.A. Shipping in Greece.

In 2010, Amalthea was chartered by the Gaddafi International Charity and Development Foundation (GICDF), a Libyan charity organization headed by Saif al-Islam Gaddafi, to deliver humanitarian aid to the Gaza Strip. Renamed Hope for the voyage, it left the port of Lavrio, Greece around 8 pm on 10 July 2010 carrying 2,000 tons of food, medical supplies and pre-fabricated houses. Israel requested the United Nations to prevent Libyan sponsored Gaza-bound marine vessel from "violating the existing naval blockade on the Gaza Strip". The ship docked at the port of El Arish, Egypt on 14 July from where the supplies were reportedly to be taken to Gaza by road. The humanitarian aid and supplies were donated by Greek companies and charities. "We got the grapes, so why kill the vineyard guard?" Saif al-Islam Gaddafi, GICDF chairman, explained the agreement of Libya to transfer fifty million US dollars through UNRWA for reconstruction of the Gaza Strip. According to reports the deal was brokered by Martin Schlaff, who is thought to have close ties to leaders in both Israel and Libya.
