= Star (Turkish newspaper) =

Turkish newspaper

- Type: Daily newspaper
- Owner(s): Doğuş Media Group
- Founded: 1999
- Political alignment: Pro-AKP
- Language: Turkish
- Ceased publication: 2019
- City: Istanbul
- Country: Turkey
- Circulation: 134,000 (May 2013)
- Website: www.star.com.tr

Star (Star Gazetesi) was a high-circulation Turkish newspaper. It was established in 1999 by Star Media Group, drawing on the brand of the group's Star TV channel. At the end of 2019, the newspaper ceased its print publication, announcing it would continue news coverage online.

In 2004 Star was seized by the Turkish government, along with the other assets of the Uzan Group (which owned the Star Media Group). The paper was transferred to the TMSF, and then sold to Ali Özmen Safa in 2006. Ethem Sancak became the sole owner in 2008, having previously become a part-owner with Safa and Hasan Doğan. It is now again part of the Star Media Group, which was acquired by Fettah Tamince and Tevhit Karakaya in 2009/10.

Star's columnists included Şamil Tayyar.
