= Star Media Group (Turkey) =

- Industry: Television, radio, periodicals, books
- Founded: 1 March 1989
- Defunct: February 2016
- Headquarters: Tepeüstü, Küçükçekmece, Istanbul, Turkey
- Area served: Turkey
- Key people: Ahmet Özal, Cem Uzan, Tevhit Karakaya, Ethem Sancak
- Website: www.stargazete.com/medya/

Star Media Group (Star Medya Grubu, STAR Medya Yayıncılık A.Ş.) is a Turkish media group. Among other properties, it owns the Star newspaper and the television channel Channel 24.

The company was co-founded by Ahmet Özal and Cem Uzan and was previously part of the Uzan Holding. In 2004 Star was seized by the Turkish government, along with the other assets of the Uzan Group. The paper was transferred to the TMSF, and then sold several times. It became part of the Star Media Group again, which was acquired by Nihat Özdemir of Rixos from Ethem Sancak in 2009, with Tevhit Karakaya acquiring 50% in 2010.

In May 2013, 50% of the Group was sold to Azerbaijan's SOCAR oil company.
