= Ethem Sancak =

Turkish businessman (born 1958)

- Born: 1958 (age 67–68); Siirt, Turkey
- Occupation: Businessman

Ethem Sancak (born 1958, Siirt) is a Turkish businessman considered to have "close ties to President of Turkey Recep Tayyip Erdoğan". He completed his primary and secondary education in Siirt. He graduated from Istanbul University's Faculty of Business Administration. Following graduation he worked as a journalist between 1976 and 1978.

Ethem Sancak was the owner of the Star Media Group from 2004 to 2009, giving its Star newspaper a more pro-Justice and Development Party (AKP) line. In early 2013, he was listed by Forbes as the 43rd richest person in Turkey.
