= Media reactions to the 2010 Gaza flotilla raid =

Media reactions to the Gaza flotilla raid on 31 May 2010 ranged from strong support to strong condemnation of Israel. Criticism included the deaths of civilians, the execution of the raid, increased sympathy toward Israel's opponents or enemies, and increased isolation of Israel.

== Israel ==
A survey of Israeli Jews published in Maariv on 2 June showed 94.8 percent agreeing that it was necessary to stop the boats, with 62.7 percent saying it should have been handled in a different manner. Only 8.1 percent thought Netanyahu should resign. The newspaper didn't say how many people were surveyed or give a margin of error.

Criticism within Israel on the flotilla operation has focused largely on the execution of the raid and not the blockade. The Israeli media, which had initially supported the IDF action and corroborated the IDF account of the incident, later criticized the operation as having been badly handled. Haaretz said that the Israeli army had fallen into a trap set by the flotilla organizers. While Israeli soldiers were supported, the government was chastised for putting Israel in a compromising situation.

The Israeli newspaper Haaretz had a headline initially reading "Botched raid on Free Gaza Flotilla", the online headline was later changed to "Israel fears diplomatic backlash in wake of Gaza flotilla deaths", while Maariv went with "Flotilla Fiasco".

Israeli journalist Gideon Levy remarked in an opinion article, "Again Israel will pay a heavy diplomatic price, once which had not been considered ahead of time. Again, the Israeli propaganda machine has managed to convince only brainwashed Israelis, and once more no one asked the question: What was it for? Why were our soldiers thrown into this trap of pipes and ball bearings? What did we get out of it?"

== Turkey ==
Ferhat Kentel from Taraf, compared the victims of the raid to Hrant Dink. Soli Özel, an instructor of international relations at Istanbul Bilgi University, a columnist for Habertürk newspaper and a frequent contributor to The Washington Post's "Post Global" in Istanbul said:

There is now civilian blood between the two countries. The natural arc of relations will have to change.

Cüneyt Ülsever, a commentator in the daily Hürriyet, has criticized the İHH, saying, "People will understand very soon that the İHH is harming Turkey, and warned that the effect of the crisis would be to persuade the West that Turkey is aligning itself with the likes of Iran, Syria, Hamas and Hezbollah."

== United States ==
The Washington Post and CBS News reported that American lawmakers in both parties expressed support for Israel in the wake of growing international condemnation following the raid. New York Democratic Party Representative Anthony Weiner said "This was about instigating an altercation and they succeeded." Another New York Representative, Gary Ackerman, told the United States House Committee on Foreign Affairs he "strongly support[s] Israel's right to defend itself, and the right of Israels naval commandos, who were executing a legal mission, to defend themselves by using force when they were brutally attacked". Politico reports. According to Fox News United States Senator John McCain said pro-Palestinian activists "wanted to provoke an international crisis ... and they obviously succeeded", while he also questioned President Obama's commitment to Israeli security in the wake of the current crisis.

Los Angeles Times asked several questions regarding the responsibility for the clash, while saying there was still much to be learned about the incident. While saying "As is so often the case with events involving Israelis and Palestinians, the competing narratives allow supporters of almost any position to hear what they want to hear." The editorial said, "This much, however, seems undeniable: Israel has done itself serious damage. [This was because] the decision to deploy armed troops to obstruct what was apparently a nonviolent mission and then, even if you accept Israel's version of events, to allow them to be drawn into a battle that left so many civilians dead, will serve as a further blow to the ailing peace process and as more fodder for those who argue that Israel's 'disproportionate' use of force is evidence of a cavalier attitude toward human life." While admitting the raid would not focus new attention on the blockade itself, the editorial also concluded in saying, "This page supports Israel's right to self-defense. We support reasonable measures to stop cross-border shelling and to keep weapons from illegally entering Gaza by land or sea. We oppose the Hamas government's consistent call for the destruction of Israel. But we also want to see an end to the blockade, which amounts to collective punishment of about 1.5 million Palestinians."

The New York Times quoted a statement allegedly from the flotilla organizers saying "A violent response from Israel will breathe new life into the Palestine solidarity movement, drawing attention to the blockade." They then said "There can be no excuse for the way that Israel completely mishandled the incident." And that the raid turned out to be "a grievous, self-inflicted wound. It has damaged Israel's ties with Turkey, once its closest ally in the Muslim world; given the Hamas-led government in Gaza a huge propaganda boost; and complicated peace talks with the Palestinian Authority in the West Bank." It also asks "Why did Israel, which has blocked some ships but allowed others to pass, decide to take a stand now? Did it make a real effort to find a compromise with Turkey, which sanctioned the flotilla? [While] Israel has a right to stop weapons from going into Gaza, but there has been no suggestion that the ships were carrying a large cache." The New York Times concludes, "needs to state clearly that the Israeli attack was unacceptable and back an impartial international investigation. The United States should also join the other permanent members of the United Nations Security Council – Britain, France, Russia and China – in urging Israel to permanently lift the blockade." Another editorial said "Turkey is understandably furious" but "Turkish officials have let their anger and rhetoric go way too far.... Israel deserves to be criticized for the flotilla disaster. But gratuitously stoking anti-Israeli sentiment is irresponsible and dangerous."

The San Francisco Chronicle called the raid a "disaster on every level". It also contended that Israel's "enemies could not have scripted a more bungled operation: ... setting off recriminations, policy breaches and deepening isolation for Israel ... The peace process, already in the cryogenic stage, is at full stop ... The episode reruns old stories. Palestinian sympathizers wanted a confrontation over Israel's blockade of Hamas-run Gaza ... and ignored offers to dock in Israeli ports and ship the aid by land.... Another horrifying Mideast moment will live on to paralyze progress in the future ... The purpose was clearly to call attention to the blockade, viewed as essential by Israel to cap terrorism, and regarded as harsh and unsuccessful by critics." It concluded, "There is no other course than to admit a serious mistake. Without one, the region is condemned to a future without change or hope."

In an op-ed piece The Wall Street Journal said "Israel's actions in boarding the flotilla of ships bound for the Gaza Strip were entirely justified and perhaps even unavoidable." Although, they add the caveat, "Unfortunately they turned into a tactical and strategic fiasco that does further damage to the Jewish State's tattered international reputation." A separate Wall Street Journal article emphasized Israel's need to keep advanced weaponry from getting to Hamas: "Those who denounce Israel today ought to at least propose how they mean to keep arms from going to Hamas—or else consider the role their denunciations will play in encouraging another war." Another article stated "the more facts that come to light about the flotilla, its passengers and their sponsors, the more it seems clear that Prime Minister Recep Tayyip Erdogan's government, far more so than Israel's, must be held to account for Monday's violent episode." After describing the links between the Islamic charity that organized the flotilla and terrorist groups, The Wall Street Journal states "No wonder that Israel was not prepared to let this flotilla break its blockade of Gaza.... Israel is entirely within its rights to prevent Hamas from linking with groups suspected of supplying arms and money to terrorists. Israel had also gone out of its way to give Turkey fair warning...." The Wall Street Journal goes on to note that Turkish foreign policy under Erdogan has become progressively radical and out of line with the U.S.

The Washington Post said the raid was a "diplomatic debacle for the government of Binyamin Netanyahu". And, "Though the investigations to come will find many to blame, it's already clear that Israel's response to the pro-Palestinian flotilla was both misguided and badly executed." The editorial also said, "We have no sympathy for the motives of the participants in the flotilla.... What's plain is that the group's nominal purpose, delivering 'humanitarian' supplies to Gaza, was secondary to the aim of provoking a confrontation." While saying "Yet the threat to Israel was political rather than military. So far there's been no indication the boats carried missiles or other arms for Hamas." It continued "Mr. Netanyahu's aim should have been to prevent the militants from creating the incident they were hoping for. Allowing the boats to dock in Gaza, as Israel had done before, would have been better than sending military commandos to intercept them. The fact that the soldiers who roped down from helicopters to the lead Turkish ferry were unprepared to subdue its passengers without using lethal force only compounded the error." It concluded, "The prime minister (Netanyahu) is in a deepening hole; his only way out is to move to the center." Another editorial stated that while "Western governments have been right to be concerned about Israel's poor judgment ... [they] ought to be at least as worried about the Turkish government ... which ... has shown a sympathy toward Islamic militants and a penchant for grotesque demagoguery toward Israel that ought to be unacceptable for a member of NATO." In reference to Turkey's statement, "Israel had no just cause to clash with 'European lawmakers, journalists, business leaders, and a Holocaust survivor,' the article noted, "there was no fighting with those people, or with five of the six boats in the fleet. All of the violence occurred aboard the Turkish ferry Mavi Marmara, and all of those who were killed were members or volunteers for the Islamic 'charity' that owned the ship." The editorial claimed that the İHH "is a member of the 'Union of Good,' a coalition that was formed to provide material support to Hamas and that was named as a terrorist entity by the United States in 2008". It then said, "The relationship between Mr. Erdogan's government and the İHH ought to be one focus of any international investigation into the incident." The article claims, "In the days since an incident that the İHH admits it provoked [Erdogan] has done his best to compete with Iran's Mahmoud Ahmadinejad and Hezbollah's Hassan Nasrallah in attacking the Jewish state [and calling] Israel's actions 'state terrorism.' [and Israel] merciless, rootless state." The editorial labeles Davutoglu's comparison saying "this attack is like 9/11 for Turkey" as an "obscene comparison". The article attacked Erdogan in saying his "attempt to exploit the incident comes only a couple of weeks after he joined Brazil's president in linking arms with Mr. Ahmadinejad, whom he is assisting in an effort to block new UN sanctions". The article mentions that Turkey's moves came despite the Obama administration overtures. "What's remarkable about his turn toward extremism is that it comes after more than a year of assiduous courting by the Obama administration, which, among other things, has overlooked his antidemocratic behavior at home, helped him combat the Kurdish PKK and catered to Turkish sensitivities about the Armenian genocide. Israel is suffering the consequences of its misjudgments and disregard of U.S. interests. Will Mr. Erdogan's behavior be without cost?"

USA Today said "In practical terms, the argument hardly matters. By opting for an assault on the six-ship convoy trying to break a 3-year-old blockade of Gaza, Israel handed its opponents a victory they could not have achieved by other means and simultaneously left itself, the United States and the struggling Mideast peace process with a huge problem.... Israel, however, remained adamant, implausibly casting the flotilla organizers as a mortal threat." They drew parallels saying "The pity is that the Israelis so lacked the same prescience, remarkable in light of their own history. No event was more important to the formation of Israel than the confrontation 63 years ago between the ship Exodus...." They believed that as a "smart solution to the current impasse.... Israel should allow humanitarian aid into Gaza on the condition that cargo first be inspected for weapons. Palestinians should accept that restriction. The United States and United Nations should try to ensure its enforcement."

== Canada ==
The Toronto Sun said the attack damaged Israel's reputation and suggested it "might have wanted to rethink the orders that led to Monday's fatal clash". It reasoned that this, along with the Dubai assassination of a Hamas leader, "left a trail of evidence a mile wide, to put a dent in the reputation of the country's legendary intelligence and security operations. " Adding, "For the peace process, this story feels relevant in ways that may not be obvious right away, as though something has shifted. It's not as simple as Israel stumbling into a PR disaster or lost international support, as some would like to make it." However, it also said, "For the Palestinians, it underscored the division between blockaded, Hamas-run Gaza and the West Bank, which has fared better in so many ways for not being Hamas-run Gaza."

== Europe ==
The Times published an article by former Spanisn Prime Minister José Maria Aznar saying the world must support Israel because "if it goes down, we all go down. In an ideal world, the assault by Israeli commandos on the 'Mavi Marmara' would not have ended up with nine dead and a score wounded. In an ideal world, the soldiers would have been peacefully welcomed on to the ship." In the article Aznar criticised Turkey, for placing Israel "in an impossible situation" in which it would have to either give up its security or face world condemnation. Aznar concluded that Israel is the West's first line of defense, and must be protected.

The Financial Times called the attack a "brazen act of piracy", that dealt a blow to the legitimacy of Israel's struggle. The paper continued, "Israel claims the activists had links with extremist groups and that some attacked Israeli soldiers with knives and sticks (and in some accounts the odd light firearm). Even if true, this would not justify the illegal capture of civilian ships carrying humanitarian aid in international waters, let alone the use of deadly force."

Günther Nonnenmacher of the editorial board of the Frankfurter Allgemeine Zeitung wrote that Israel seems to have lost all sense of proportion and would not pay attention to public opinion. The raid on the convoy would constitute a new level of escalation.

The Croatian daily Jutarnji list said Croatia was in an unenviable position because "On the one hand, the country feels responsibility towards Israel and its politics have always reflected that responsibility. On the other hand, Turkey is an important ally in the region with its influence on the reform processes in Bosnia and Herzegovina, and as a growing trading partner for Croatia."

The Wall Street Journal said that skepticism concerning the IHH version of events on the Mavi Marmara "appears to have accelerated as a result of unexpected criticism of the IHH's actions from Turkish moderate Islamic leader Fethullah Gülen". Turkey's Cuneyt Ulsever, a commentator in the daily Hürriyet, wrote, "People will understand very soon that the IHH is harming Turkey, and warned that the effect of the crisis would be to persuade the West that Turkey is aligning itself with the likes of Iran, Syria, Hamas and Hezbollah." The Wall Street Journal said that skepticism concerning the IHH version of events on the Mavi Marmara "appears to have accelerated as a result of unexpected criticism of the IHH's actions from Turkish moderate Islamic leader Fethullah Gülen". The religious conservative daily Vakit published on its front page the names and photographs of eight newspaper columnists who censured the government's handling of the flotilla affair, calling them "spin doctors who shoot bullets at the aid ship".

== Artistic response ==
Pixies, Gorillaz, and Klaxons were among the bands scheduled to play at Tel Aviv's Pic.Nic festival. According to festival organizers, all three groups cancelled their plans in relation to the naval raid. In addition Gil Scott-Heron cancelled an appearance.

The Brazilian film maker Iara Lee wrote about her experience on the ship in an article in the San Francisco Chronicle in which she said "Israel's powerful navy could have easily approached our boat and boarded it in broad daylight or pursued nonviolent options for disabling our vessel. Instead, the Israeli military launched a nighttime assault with heavily armed commandos.... I feared for the lives of my fellow passengers as I heard shots being fired on deck, and I later saw the bodies of several people killed being carried inside.... When it was over, the Israeli soldiers commandeered our ships, illegally kidnapped us from international waters, towed us to the port of Ashdod, and arrested all of us on board." Concluding, "What happened to our flotilla is happening to the people of Gaza on a daily basis. It will not stop until international law is applied to all countries, Israel included."

Meg Ryan and Dustin Hoffman canceled their appearances in 2010's Jerusalem Film Festival. According to associate director of the festival, Yigal Molad Hayo, neither gave the political climate as a direct reason for canceling their participation in the festival but it became quite clear that was the reason.

Comedic response

Latma TV, an initiative of the Center for Security Policy, a staunchly conservative organization located in Washington, D.C., produced a video titled We Con the World and set to the tune of the 1985 hit, "We Are the World". The video, which is published on the internet, satirizes the political intentions of the activists aboard the MV Mavi Marmara with up to a dozen members of the so-called "Flotilla Choir"— some wearing a variation of traditional Arab dress—sing satirical verses, such as: "There's no people dying, so the best that we can do is create the biggest bluff of all." The Israeli government's press office later apologized for circulating a link to the video that mocked activists on board, and clarified that it does not represent Israel's official stance. The creation of the film was initiated by Caroline Glick, the deputy managing director and columnist for the Jerusalem Post.

Documentary

Following upon the event and the various video clips presented by both Turkey and Israel, Iranian filmmaker Saeed Faraji created Freedom Flotilla, a 56-minute documentary film about the event as his first feature length film project. The film aired in three parts on 16, 17 and 18 November 2010 and on Iran Television Channel 1 and Channel 4.

== See also ==
- Reactions to the Gaza flotilla raid
- International reaction to the Gaza War
