= 2014 Israeli oil spill =

Oil spill near Be'er Ora Israel

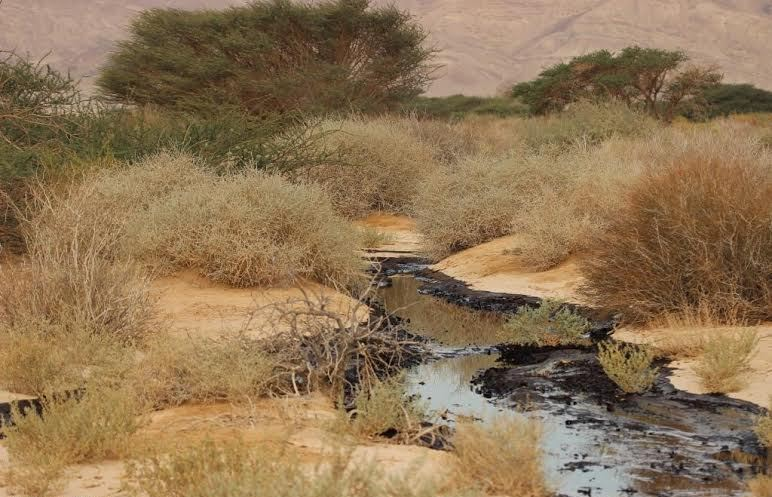
- Interactive map of 2014 Israeli oil spill
- Location: Be'er Ora, Israel
- Coordinates: 29°40′29.28″N 35°0′25.56″E
- Date: 4 December 2014

Cause
- Cause: Maintenance work on the Trans-Israel pipeline
- Operator: Eilat Ashkelon Pipeline Company

Spill characteristics
- Volume: 3,000,000–5,000,000 litres (660,000–1,100,000 imp gal; 790,000–1,320,000 US gal)

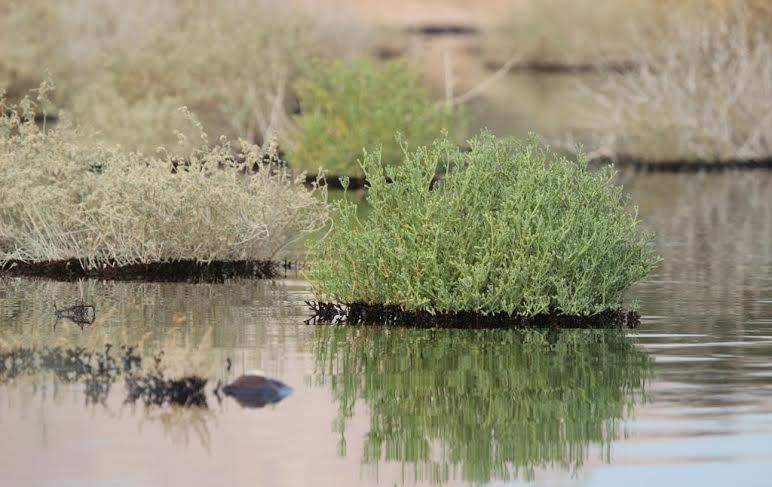
2014 Israeli oil spill in Evrona nature reserve

In December 2014, a major oil spill occurred in the vicinity of Be'er Ora Israel, with an estimated 3-5 million liters of crude oil leaking from a breached pipeline, contaminating much of the Evrona nature reserve. An Environmental Protection Ministry official stated that the cleanup would likely take years, and that the spill was one of the gravest natural disasters in the country's history.

On December 9, 2014, Ofir Akunis was appointed as the deputy environmental protection minister. Akunis replaced Amir Peretz, who resigned from his post at the helm of the ministry. The appointment by Prime Minister Benjamin Netanyahu's office came a week after the massive crude oil spill in Israel's Arava region. Akunis said that "it is the deputy minister's intention to prioritize treatment of the ecological disaster in the south and to do all that is necessary to prevent the spread of the crude oil, and to prevent a health and environmental disaster." Akunis ordered crews to raise the side walls of the dams that had been built in the Arava to prevent flooding. Thanks to the infrastructure that had already been built in the area, the risk that the oil would reach the Gulf of Eilat significantly dropped. Akunis instructed that the reserve remain closed as long as high values of pollutants were still registered in air quality tests.

In the end of December 2014, the government approved a NIS 17 million Environmental Protection Ministry plan to rehabilitate. According to Akunis, program would serve to treat the soils contaminated by the spill, as well as help restore the wildlife populations damaged over the course of the event. As part of the plan, a special team would be appointed to evaluate the environmental impact of various Eilat Ashkelon Pipeline Company activities on both dry land and beaches. The approved plan also involved opening a closed Eilat beach on EAPC-owned property to the city's residents and visitors. In January 2015, air quality tests found that there had been a 90% reduction of pollution in Evrona.

A major soil restoration project commenced in June 2026, eleven years after the oil spill.

== See also ==
- Zin Desert
