= Choke point =

Critical military pathway

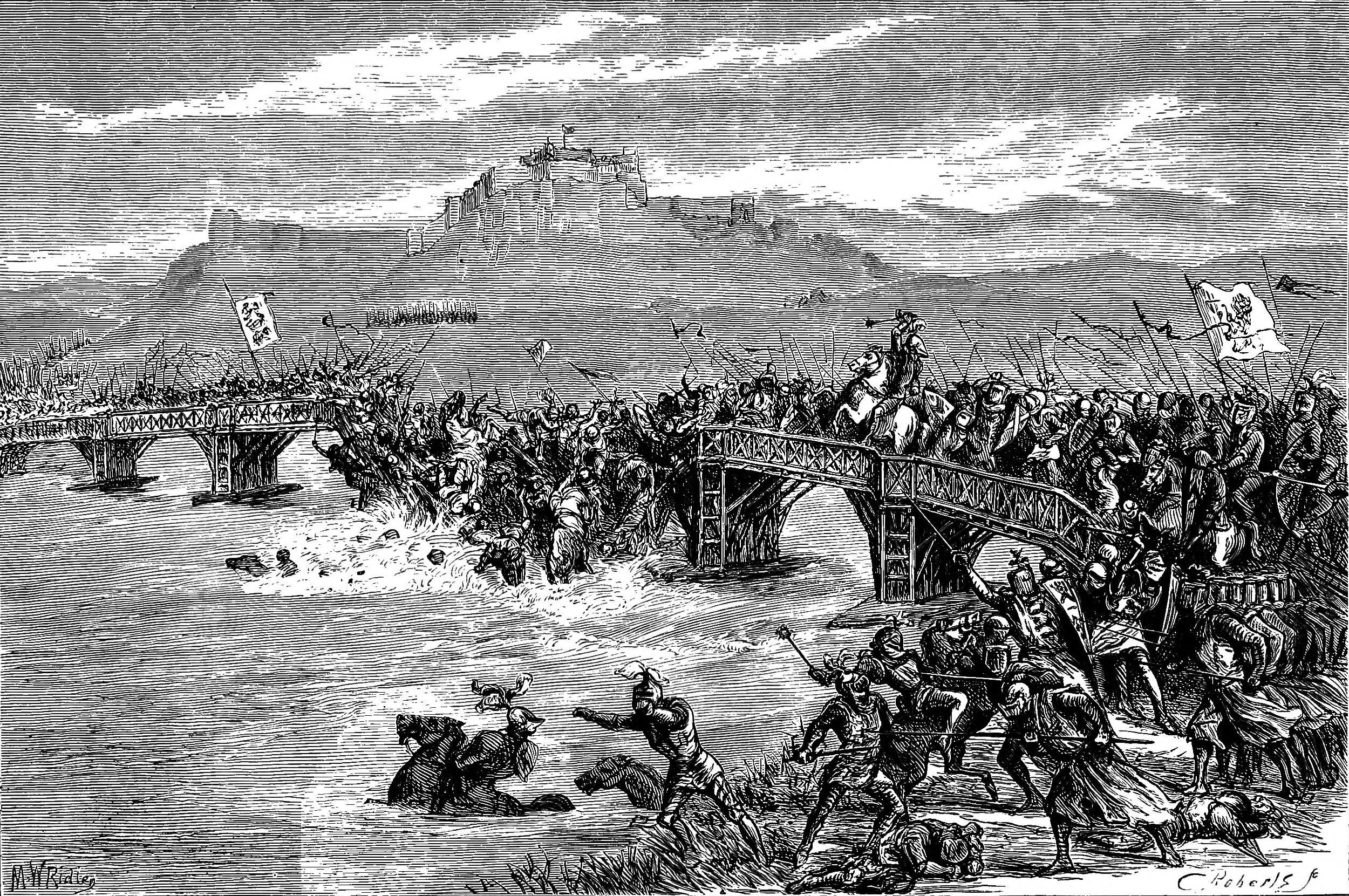
The Battle of Stirling Bridge had a choke point at a narrow wooden bridge near Stirling Castle

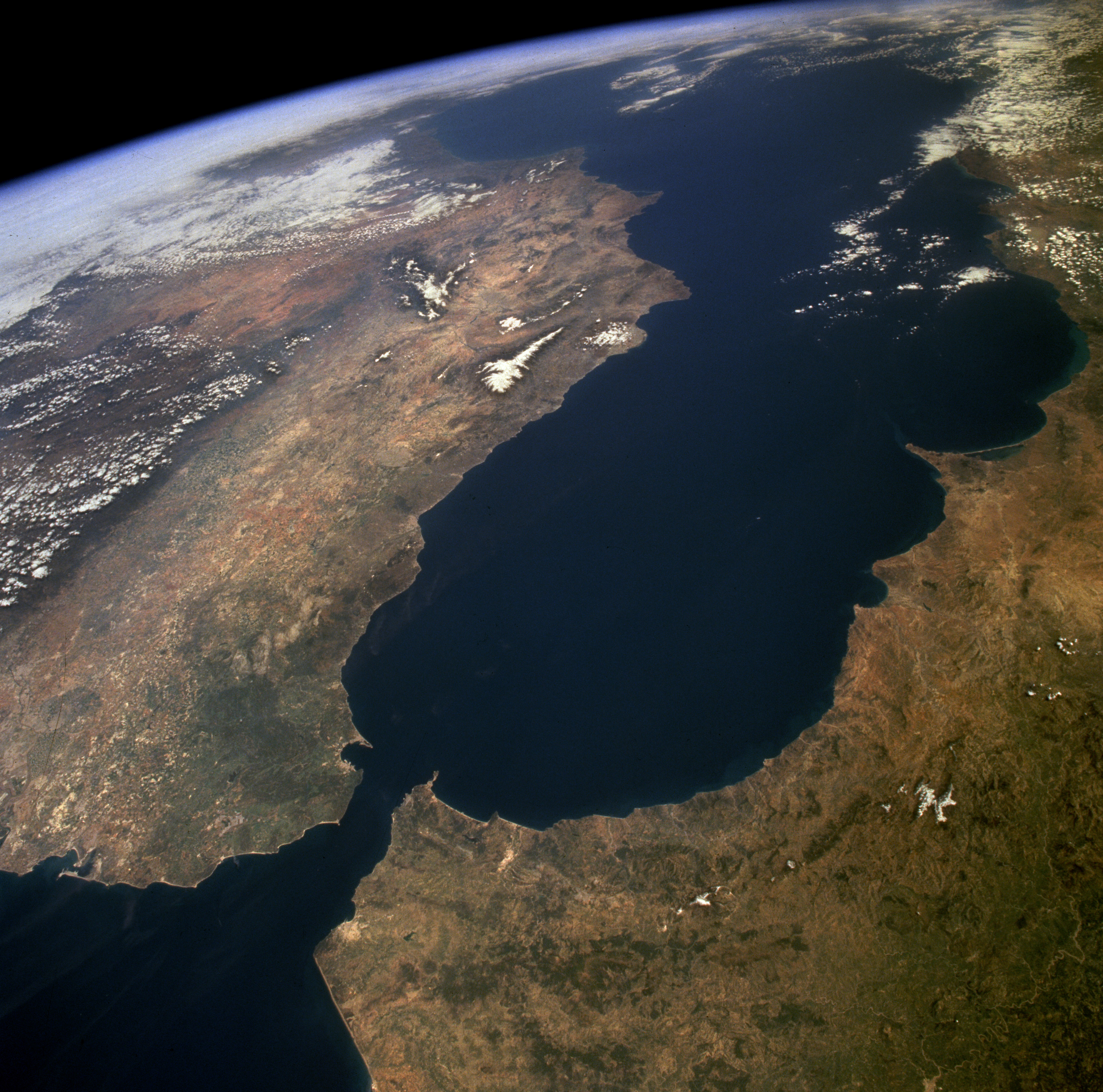
The Strait of Gibraltar is an important naval choke point, as entry to the Mediterranean Sea can be blocked there by a small number of vessels.

In military strategy, a choke point (or chokepoint), or sometimes bottleneck, is a geographical feature on land such as a valley, defile, isthmus or bridge, or maritime passage through a critical waterway such as a strait, which an armed force is forced to pass through in order to reach its objective, sometimes on a substantially narrowed front and therefore greatly decreasing its combat effectiveness by making it harder to bring superior numbers to bear.

A choke point can allow a numerically inferior defending force to use the terrain as a force multiplier to thwart or ambush a much larger opponent, as the attacker cannot advance any further without first securing passage through the choke point.

== Historical examples ==
Some historical examples of the tactical use of choke points are King Leonidas I's unsuccessful defense of the Pass of Thermopylae during an invasion led by Xerxes I of Persia; the Battle of Covadonga, in which the army of Pelagius of Asturias defeated the much larger forces of the Umayyad Caliphate; the Battle of Stamford Bridge, in which Harold Godwinson defeated Harald Hardrada; William Wallace's victory over the English at the Battle of Stirling Bridge (Wallace had around 2,300 men against the English army of about 9,000 to 12,000 men and the bridge collapsed during the battle); and the Battle of Agincourt in which Henry V of England decisively defeated the French using a small army (consisting mainly of lightly equipped longbowmen) when the much larger force of French heavy cavalry were forced to charge at the Englishmen through a narrow muddy gap in the Azincourt Woods.

The many archipelagos of the Caribbean offered several maritime choke points that attracted pirates and buccaneers during the height of their activities in the 17th and early 18th century. The Spanish treasure fleets leaving the Americas would have to pass through those waters to pick up the strong, prevailing westerly winds that would take them back to Spain across the North Atlantic.

Some choke points, with important locations in parentheses:

- Strait of Hormuz passage from the Persian Gulf to the Indian Ocean (Oman and Iran)
- Lombok Strait
- Taiwan Strait
- Mona Passage
- Windward Passage
- Yucatan Channel
- Makassar Strait
- Sunda Strait
- Torres Strait
- Bohai Strait
- Ombai Strait
- Luzon Strait
- Tsugaru Strait
- Korea Strait
- Cape of Good Hope
- Bab-el-Mandeb passage from the Arabian Sea to the Red Sea (Yemen, Djibouti and Eritrea)
- Strait of Malacca and the Singapore Strait between Malaysia and Sumatra (Indonesia)
- Turkish straits linking the Black Sea (and oil coming from the Caspian Sea region) to the Mediterranean Sea (Turkey)
  - Bosphorus
  - Sea of Marmara
  - Dardanelles
- Suez Canal connecting the Red Sea and Mediterranean Sea (Egypt)
- Straits of Tiran connecting the Gulf of Aqaba and the Red Sea (Egypt and Saudi Arabia)
- Khyber Pass between Afghanistan and Pakistan
- Strait of Gibraltar along the Atlantic Ocean entering the Mediterranean Sea (Spain, Gibraltar and Morocco)
- Strait of Dover and the English Channel separating the Atlantic Ocean and the North Sea (United Kingdom, Crown Dependencies and France)
- Sea of Åland connecting the Gulf of Bothnia and the Baltic Sea (Finland and Sweden)
- Waterbodies connecting the Baltic Sea and the North Sea:
  - Danish Straits (Denmark and Sweden)
  - Kattegat and Skagerrak (Norway, Denmark and Sweden)
  - Kiel Canal (Germany)
- Waterbodies connecting the Pacific and Atlantic oceans including:
  - Panama Canal (Panama)
  - Strait of Magellan (Chile and Argentina)
  - Beagle Channel (Chile and Argentina)
  - Drake Passage
- Bering Strait (United States of America and Russia)
- Strait of Tartary along Sea of Japan and Sea of Okhotsk (Russia)
- Suwałki Gap
- Focșani Gate

The Fulda Gap was seen as one of the potentially decisive bottleneck battlegrounds of the Cold War in Germany.

=== Royal Navy choke points ===
From the 18th to the early 20th centuries, the sheer size of the United Kingdom's Royal Navy meant it had control over much of the world's oceans and seas. Choke points were of huge importance to the British Empire, which often used them to control trade in British colonies and, to a lesser extent, for defense. Choke points have also been a source of tension, notably during the Suez Crisis. The Royal Navy still deems its choke points as strategically vital. Indeed, the importance of choke points was first recognised by British Admiral John Fisher.

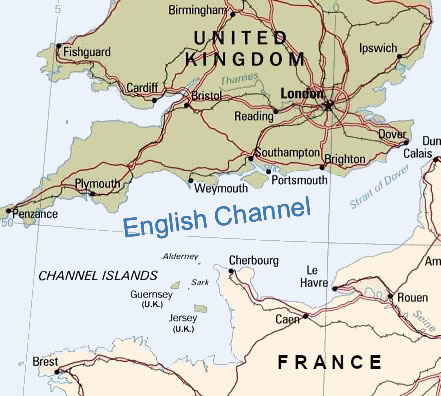
The English Channel, a choke point south of England and north of France

These are major British choke points today:

- The English Channel
- GIUK gap (between Greenland, Iceland, and UK)
- Strait of Gibraltar

The choke points still have significant strategic importance for the Royal Navy. The GIUK gap is particularly important to the Royal Navy, as any attempt by northern European forces to break into the open Atlantic would have to do so through the heavily defended English Channel, which is also the world's busiest shipping lane, or through one of the exits on either side of Iceland. Considering British control over the strategic fortress of Gibraltar at the entrance to the Mediterranean, Spain (northern coast), France (Atlantic coast) and Portugal are the only mainland European nations that have direct access to the Atlantic Ocean in a way that cannot be easily blocked at a choke point by the Royal Navy. The GIUK gap was also a strategically important part of the Cold War, as the Royal Navy were given the responsibility of keeping an eye on Soviet submarines trying to break into the open Atlantic.

== Importance ==
Global energy trade relies heavily on maritime transport, as oil, natural gas, and LNG are primarily shipped by sea. Within this system, maritime chokepoints are critical passages along major shipping routes through which a large share of global energy supplies transits. Their strategic location makes them essential nodes for both maritime traffic and energy security. Disruptions at these chokepoints can quickly affect transport costs, price stability, and the reliability of energy markets. As a result, they also carry strong geopolitical importance and play a central role in shaping policies aimed at ensuring stable, sustainable, and resilient maritime trade over the long term.

Choke points remain a prominent issue in the global economy and shipments of goods, particularly oil: 20% of the world's oil is shipped through the Strait of Hormuz. In 2018, 20.7 million barrels per day were transported through the strait. The choke point has undergone continuous unrest since the 1980s. This includes, the downing of Iran Air Flight 655 by an American surface-to-air missile in 1988, the collision between nuclear submarine USS Newport News and crude tanker Mogamigawa in 2007, U.S.–Iranian naval dispute in 2008 and 2011–2012, seizure of MV Maersk Tigris in 2015 and threats of a strait closure in 2018 and 2019 made by the Islamic Republic of Iran. Most recently, in April 2020, statements from Iran's military shows its readiness to defend its territorial integrity.

The Suez Canal and the Sumed pipeline carry 4.5 million barrels (190,000,000 US gal; 720,000 m^{3}) a day, and the canal carried a total of 7.5% of world trade in 2011. The canal was closed for eight years after the Six-Day War in 1967. In many instances, alternate routes are nonexistent or impractical. For example, an alternate to the Suez/Sumed route required an additional 6,000 miles (9,700 km) around Cape of Good Hope. The Royal Navy also still deems its choke points to the Atlantic as strategically important.

== See also ==
- Land (economics)
- Strategic geography
- Sea lines of communication
- String of Pearls (China)
