= Shraga Simmons =

Orthodox rabbi, author and filmmaker

- Born: July 1, 1961 (age 65); Buffalo, New York, U.S.
- Education: University of Texas at Austin
- Employer: Aish HaTorah
- Known for: Jewish outreach, media coverage of the Arab-Israeli conflict
- Title: Rabbi

Shraga Simmons (born 1 July 1961) is an Orthodox Jewish rabbi, journalist, filmmaker, brand builder and Torah-themed marketer. He is the co-founder of the educational website Aish.com and the pro-Israel media watch group HonestReporting. He is also creator of the online Torah study site Aish Academy.

== Biography ==
Simmons was born and raised in Buffalo, New York. After graduating from the University of Texas at Austin with a degree in journalism, he worked as a reporter for newspapers and magazines, specializing in entertainment. He led marketing campaigns for various politicians, entertainers and professional athletes. In 1994, he received rabbinic ordination from the Chief Rabbi of Jerusalem. He served three years as Director of Outreach for Aish HaTorah in Los Angeles.

== Jewish education ==
He was a close student of Rabbi Noah Weinberg, served as his ghostwriter for 20 years, and co-authored the best-selling 48 Ways to Wisdom. In 1997, he was selected to run the Aish internet site, serving as editor for 25 years. He has been quoted as a rabbinical authority in print and online media.

He is author of LifeWisdom, a multi-volume Torah study curriculum; the Discovery Seminar sourcebook; courses on Brachot, Middot, and Jewish history; the column "Shraga's Weekly" on Chumash; and hundreds of essays on spirituality, happiness, success, Jewish holidays, lifecycle and history, translated into 10 languages.

== Zionist activism ==
Simmons is an activist in matters regarding media bias relating to the Arab–Israeli conflict. In 2000, he co-founded HonestReporting.com, the pro-Israel media watch group. In 2012, he authored David & Goliath, a study of Western media bias in coverage of the Arab–Israeli conflict. As a historical study of the years 2000–2011, the book includes statistical studies that claim to document a pervasive pro-Palestinian slant in the New York Times, CNN and much of the British media.

In 2006 he produced a short film "Photo Fraud in Lebanon" which became the first Jewish-themed video to register 5 million views. In 2011 he produced a video which exposed "glaring inconsistencies in the general media coverage" of the 2010 Gaza flotilla raid, according to the Pittsburgh Jewish Chronicle.

In 2012 he wrote, directed and produced a short Internet film, The Red Line, arguing for the urgency of preventing Iran from acquiring nuclear weapons.

In 2017 he wrote, directed and produced Jerusalem: Unite or Divide?, a film and marketing campaign to promote the 50th anniversary of reunified Jerusalem.

== Books ==
- David & Goliath: The Explosive Inside Story of Media Bias in the Israeli-Palestinian Conflict. Emesphere. 2012. ISBN 978-0-9840398-0-7.
- Thumbs Up!, stories and teachings of Rabbi Noah Weinberg and Rabbi Kalman Packouz. Shabbat Shalom. 2023. ISBN 978-0-9992880-2-3..

Simmons has co-edited five collections of articles which originally appeared on Aish.com:

- 48 Ways to Wisdom. ArtScroll. 2017. ISBN 978-1-4226-1862-2.
- Like Water on a Rock. ArtScroll. 2011. ISBN 978-1-4226-1175-3.
- Heaven on Earth: Down to earth Jewish spirituality. Targum Press. 2002. ISBN 1-56871-206-5.
- Israel: Life in the shadow of terror. Targum Press. 2003. ISBN 1-56871-237-5.
- Triumph: Inspiring true stories of challenge and spiritual growth. Targum Press. 2006. ISBN 1-56871-411-4.

== Articles ==
- "Antisemitism and the Holocaust" in Kornbluth, Doron (1999). Jewish Matters: A Pocketbook of Knowledge and Inspiration. Targum/Feldheim in conjunction with Jewish Direct. pp. 30–37. ISBN 1-56871-188-3.
