= Jakhi Isaiah =

Jakhi Isaiah (legally Jakhi Lodgson-McCray) is an American activist who pleaded guilty to torching ten empty New York City Police Department vehicles and a trailer in Brooklyn in 2025.

== Biography ==
Isaiah is from Maplewood, New Jersey. He is a graduate of Columbia High School.

He was arrested in protests in opposition the war and genocide in Gaza and in opposition to ICE—including a May 2024 protest in Queens and a May 2025 demonstration in Manhattan—charged with resisting arrest and disorderly conduct in each. In another incident in 2024, he was arrested after police said he set fire to flags of Israel and the US outside the Israeli consulate in New York City.

=== Charges in paint protest at Columbia University ===
In July 2025, Isaiah was charged with vandalism for a splattering of red paint on the Alma Mater statue on Columbia University's campus in September 2024, on the first day of classes of the 2024–25 academic year. Columbia University said the paint protest had caused thousands of dollars of property damage; all the paint had been removed by the end of the day.

The incident was investigated by the NYPD and Columbia's department of Public Safety as well as the Bureau of Alcohol, Tobacco, Firearms and Explosives and the US Marshals Service. Investigators said they used surveillance footage from over 21 different angles spanning two hours surrounding the incident and facial recognition technology. According to The Intercept, "highly politicized federal agencies are now more regularly working hand in glove with local police departments" in cases against pro-Palestine protesters under the second Trump administration, especially after executive actions targeting leftist activism, such as National Security Presidential Memorandum-7 (NSPM-7).

Isaiah was arrested by the NYPD months after the September 2024 paint protest at Columbia in an unrelated anti-ICE protest, but was not charged or arraigned on offenses related to Columbia despite being in NYPD custody.

=== Vehicular arson in Bushwick ===
On April 9, 2026, Isaiah pleaded guilty to torching ten empty New York City Police Department vehicles and a trailer on Thursday June 12, 2025, when he was 21 years old. Isaiah waived his right to a trial and said before the judge that his actions were intentional. Isaiah faces a sentence of 5 to 20 years in jail.

According to the police, around 1:30 am, Isaiah scaled the fence of the parking lot of NYPD Patrol Borough Brooklyn North on DeKalb Avenue, which is within the 83rd precinct in Bushwick, and lit the vehicles on fire using "commercially available fire starters", causing over $800,000 in property damage. It was the same week as anti-ICE protests in Los Angeles and protests in New York City in solidarity with Los Angeles. According to NYPD Chief Of Detectives Joseph Kenny, "It’s not just an attack on the NYPD. It was an attack on the neighborhood of Bushwick itself". The judge told him "arson is not a form of protest; it is a dangerous crime". New York City Police Commissioner Jessica Tisch said, "the arson attack against New York City Police Department vehicles in Bushwick, Brooklyn was as cowardly as it was criminal," adding that "the defendant in this case may have wanted to send a message – but all he did was mobilize the full force of the NYPD, the ATF, and the FDNY to identify, locate, and arrest him."

Isaiah was identified as a suspect by June 18 and federally charged with arson. On June 25, the NYPD offered a $30,000 bounty for information leading to his arrest. Following a weeks-long manhunt, Isaiah turned himself in to federal authorities on July 21, issuing a statement published by Columbia University Apartheid Divest that condemned the charges and framed the campaign against him and against protest in solidarity with Palestine as state repression. In July 2025, Isaiah pleaded not guilty and was released on a bail set at $300,000. After his release, police officers brought him to Manhattan Criminal Court for arraignment on state charges.

The Support Committee for Jakhi McCray described him as a "dedicated organizer, activist, and community member whose work has touched countless lives".
