= Nahal Zin fuel leak =

2011 ecological disaster

The Nahal Zin fuel leak (Hebrew: אסון נחל צין) was a severe ecological disaster caused in June 2011 when a backhoe loader struck and ruptured an underground fuel pipeline in southern Israel. 1.5 million liters of jet fuel leaked into the surrounding soil, resulting in localized soil contamination, damage to nearby flora, and wasted fuel. It is considered the worst ecological disaster ever to befall a nature reserve in the history of the State of Israel.

== Background ==
=== Nahal Zin ===
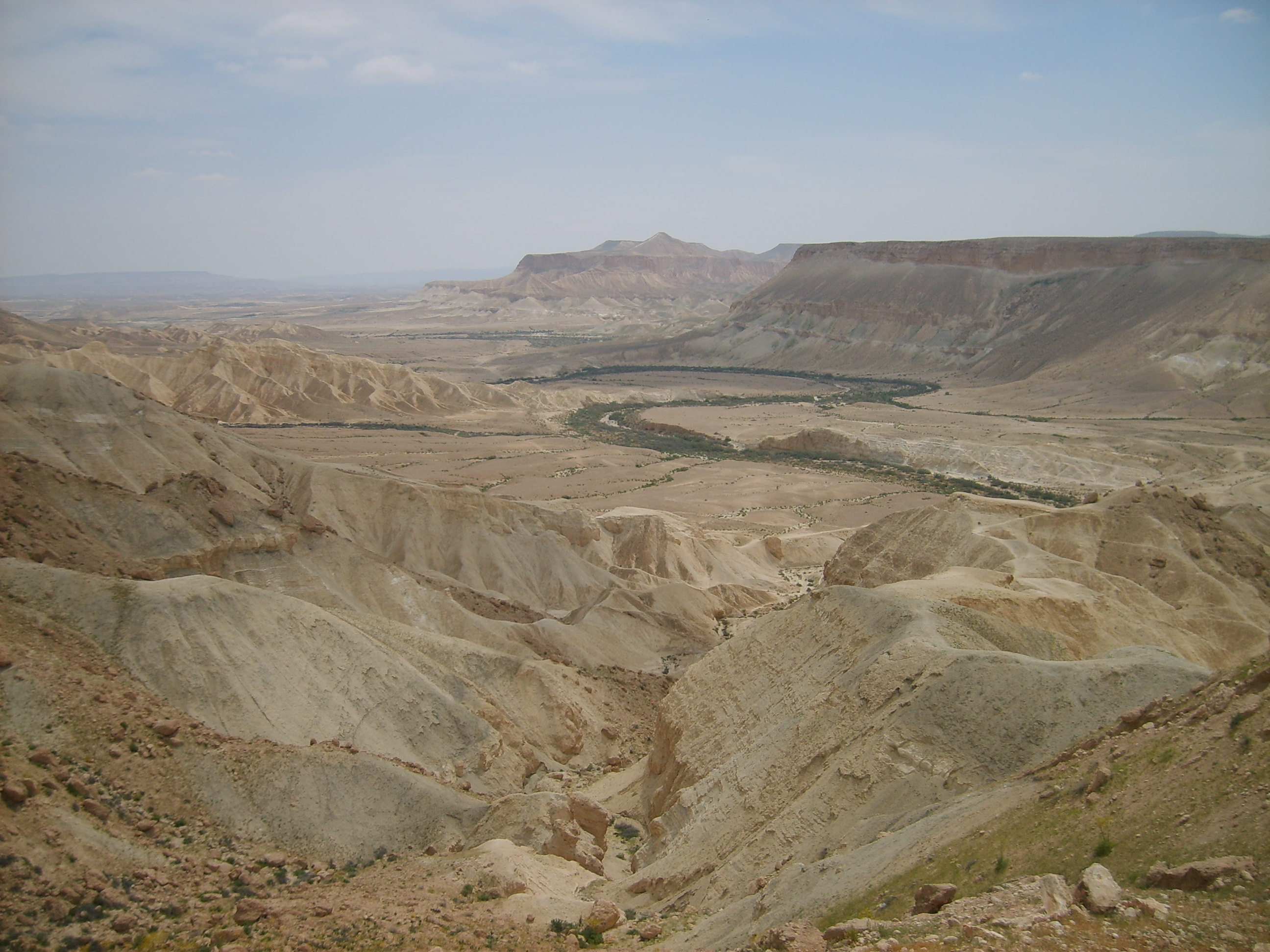
Nahal Zin

Nahal Zin is a 120-kilometer-long intermittent stream in Israel's Negev desert in the south of the country. Its source is at Mount Hemet (918 m) and it flows generally northeast, draining into the salt pan of Sodom at the southern tip of the Dead Sea. Vegetation in the vicinity of Nahal Zin is sparse, but the banks of the stream and occasional springs along the way abound in reeds, juncus, atriplex, and tamarix. Due to the lack of trees, local avifauna are typically ground-breeders. Geologists have determined that Nahal Zin used to flow northwest and drain into the Mediterranean Sea via the Besor Stream; however, as the Jordan Rift Valley formed, it altered course dramatically and channeled its way northeast to the Dead Sea instead.

=== Eilat Ashkelon Pipeline Company ===
The Eilat Ashkelon Pipeline Company operates several pipelines delivering oil and related products to and from the Port of Eilat.

== Main leak ==
External images
- "The damaged pipe"—Ynetnews
- "The pipe that leaked at Nahal Zin" —Haaretz

On the morning of 29 June 2011, a backhoe loader was engaged in maintenance work at a point where Nahal Zin intersects one of the oil pipelines operated by the Eilat-Ashkelon Pipeline Company (EAPC). It struck and ruptured the pipeline, causing some 1.5 million liters of jet fuel to gush out for several hours and leak into the surrounding soil. With an affected radius of half a kilometer around the rupture point and a depth of several meters, fears were raised that damage to the surrounding environment would be extensive. Within two weeks of the disaster, the Israel Nature and Parks Authority reported that vegetation on the Nahal Zin nature reserve had dried up.

=== Cleanup ===
External image
- A cleanup crew stands in a puddle of leaked fuel—Ministry of Environmental Protection (Israel)

In an initial bid to contain the situation, dams were set up to impede the flow of fuel downstream and a ditch was dug in order to coax the fuel back to a single point for pumping. EAPC was instructed to pump dry the puddles of jet fuel that had formed on the ground and to transfer the affected soil to a treatment plant for decontamination. Experts consulted to evaluate the extent of the damage estimated that cleaning up the area of the spill would take weeks to months, with fears that if the situation was not resolved by wintertime, rainfall would exacerbate it. A hydrologist from the University of Haifa estimated that, should it emerge that the 25-meter-deep aquifer became polluted, it could take years for the area to be rehabilitated and cleansed of contaminants.

In August the Nature and Parks Authority reported that most of the cleanup operations had been completed and that work would soon begin to restore the scenery of the area. At the same time, senior contacts in the nature preservation community told Haaretz that the scale on which earth had been removed from the vicinity of the spill was excessive and had turned it into "a mining and quarrying site". An official Nature and Parks Authority report completed in late August indicated that the rehabilitation efforts had indeed taken an ecological toll on the site and seriously disrupted the routines of local wildlife.

EAPC and representatives from Israel's Ministry of the Environment held a ceremony marking the completion of cleanup efforts on 27 September. EAPC stated that it successfully restored the Nahal Zin area to its earlier state prior to the leak.

=== Reactions ===
EAPC denied responsibility for the disaster, stating that the driver of the backhoe loader was there by subcontract and that an on-site park ranger had instructed him to transplant a tree. It attributed the accident to "profound incompetence" on the part of the park ranger and the driver.

Israel's Ministry of the Environment called the disaster the worst ever on an Israeli nature reserve. A spokeswoman for the ministry said that no automatic safety valves were ever installed as a precaution should a leak occur, and further charged EAPC with failing to ensure that it had vehicles capable of negotiating the terrain fast enough to deal with the leak before the fuel had a chance to be absorbed by the soil.

The chairman of the Knesset Environment and Health Committee urged the government to adopt his recommendation for a revised Petroleum Law and radically alter its approach to fossil fuel-related environmental protection.

A spokeswoman for Greenpeace in Israel called the disaster "a large, black flag" for Israel and said more needed to be done to end Israel's reliance on oil and to promote renewable energy alternatives.

Israel's Green Movement co-chairman at Ben-Gurion University accused Israel's infrastructural institutions of being derelict both in protecting the nation's natural resources and in ensuring that adequate measures are in place for immediate cleanup efforts when they become necessary.

== Second leak ==
On 5 September 2011 an EAPC pipeline was again ruptured as a result of maintenance work. A backhoe loader struck the pipeline at a location half a kilometer south of where the first leak occurred in June. EAPC workers promptly arrived at the scene and began sealing the pipeline. By evening, efforts were being undertaken to pump the leaked fuel out of the riverbed. The Ministry of Environmental Protection estimated that 100 m³ of jet fuel had leaked from the pipe. Minister Gilad Erdan called EAPC's actions "careless" and said he intends to demand that the EAPC Law, currently granting immunity to the company in environmental matters, be revised in order that EAPC may be held accountable for its actions.

== See also ==
- Ein Avdat
- Oil spill
- Zin Desert
