= Trans-Israel pipeline =

Oil pipeline in Israel

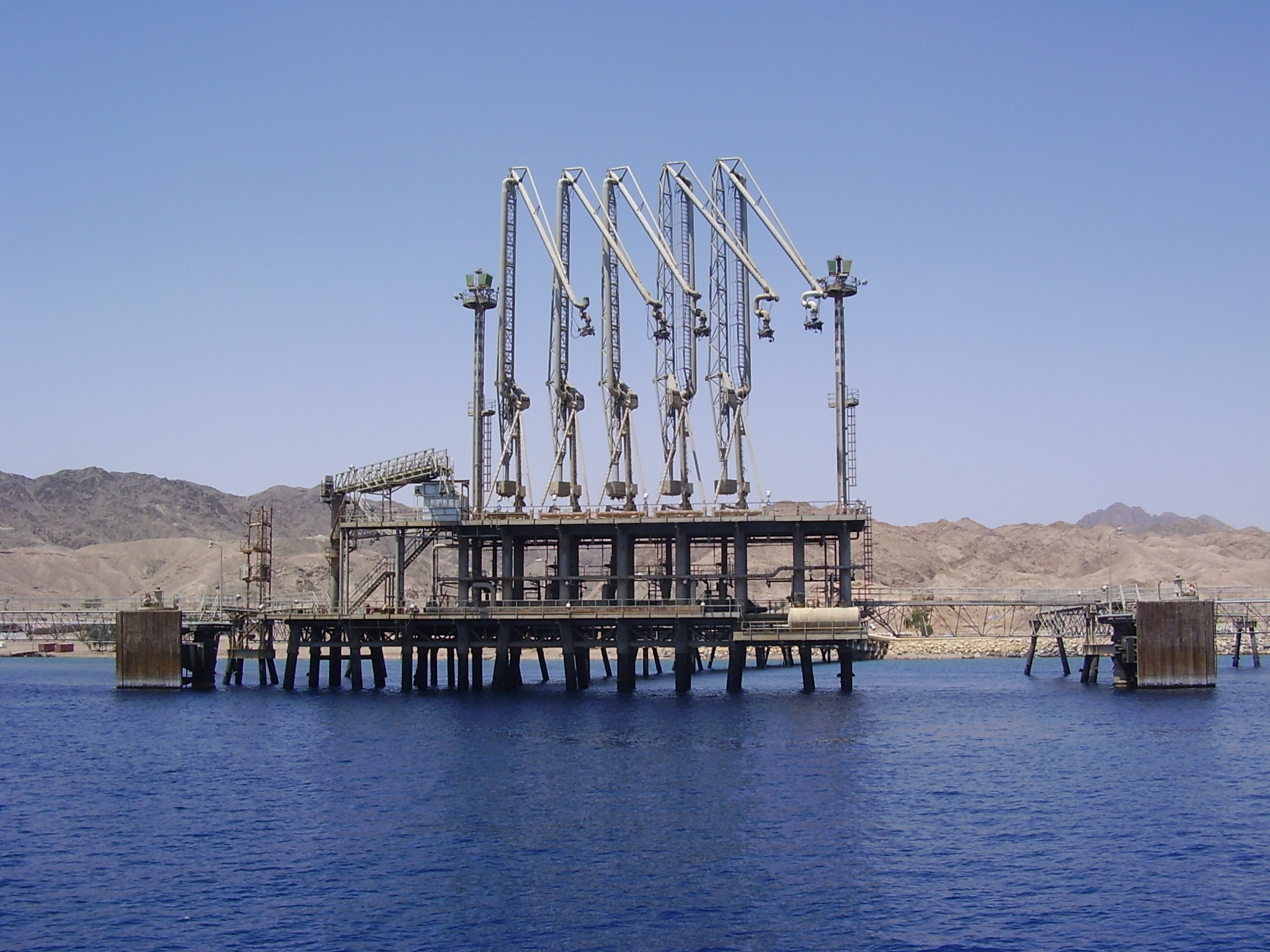
Oil jetty in Eilat

Trans-Israel pipeline map

The Trans-Israel pipeline (Hebrew: קו צינור אילת אשקלון), also Tipline, Eilat–Ashkelon Pipeline, or Europe–Asia Pipeline is an oil pipeline in Israel extending from the Gulf of Aqaba on the Red Sea to the Mediterranean Sea. It was originally built to transport crude oil originating from Iran inside Israel and to Europe.

The 254 km, 42" pipeline's capacity from a special pier in Ashkelon to Eilat's port on the Red Sea is 400,000 barrels (64,000 m^{3}) per day, and 1.2 million barrels per day (190,000 m^{3}/d) in the opposite direction. The pipeline is owned and operated by the Eilat Ashkelon Pipeline Company (EAPC) which also operates several other oil pipelines in Israel.

== History ==
Following the 1956 Suez Crisis, the Israeli government started the country's first crude oil pipeline between the Red Sea and the Mediterranean Sea with a 24,000 bbl/day 8-inch pipe line from Eilat to Beersheba. Initially augmented by truck and rail transport to the Mediterranean coast and to Israel's only and underutilized refinery at Haifa, the link to the coast was completed in 1957 with a 16-inch line from Beersheba to Ashdod. Tankers were then carrying crude oil to Haifa. The final leg, a 90-mile 16-inch pipe line from Ashdod to Haifa along the coast was completed in July 1958. An expansion of capacity of the 125 mile section from the Red Sea to Beersheba was initiated in February 1960, raising the overall capacity of the system from 30,000 bbl/day to 100,000 bbl/day. The expansion coincided with the beginning of production for export at Haifa, which had been lacking a sufficient supply of crude oil since 1948 and was producing only for the local market.

The large diameter pipeline was built in 1968 as a 50/50% joint-venture between Israel and Iran. However, Iran ceased using the pipeline after the overthrow of Shah Mohammad Reza Pahlavi in the Iranian Islamic Revolution of 1979 and the subsequent severing of relations between the two countries.

In 2003, Israel and Russia made an agreement to supply Asian markets with Russian oil delivered by tankers from Novorossiysk to Ashkelon and then reloaded onto tankers in Eilat for shipment to Asia. The oil would therefore flow in the opposite direction to that intended originally. This route from Europe to Asia is shorter than the traditional one around Africa and cheaper than the one via the Suez Canal.

In December 2014, a breach near the southern end of the pipeline led to a massive oil spill into the Evrona Nature Reserve.

In September 2020, a preliminary agreement was reached to transport Emirati oil from the Red Sea to the Mediterranean through the pipeline.

In May 2021, a storage tank in the Ashkelon depot of the pipeline was damaged by a rocket fired from Gaza in the 2021 Israel–Palestine crisis.

=== Legal claim by Iran ===
Following the seizure of the pipeline in 1979, Iran pursued a claim for compensation against Israel. On 27 June 2016, the Swiss Federal Tribunal decided the case in Iran's favor with an award of $1.1 billion plus interest.

== See also ==
- Sumed pipeline
