= Noam Jacobson =

Israeli musician

Noam Jacobson נעם יעקובסון
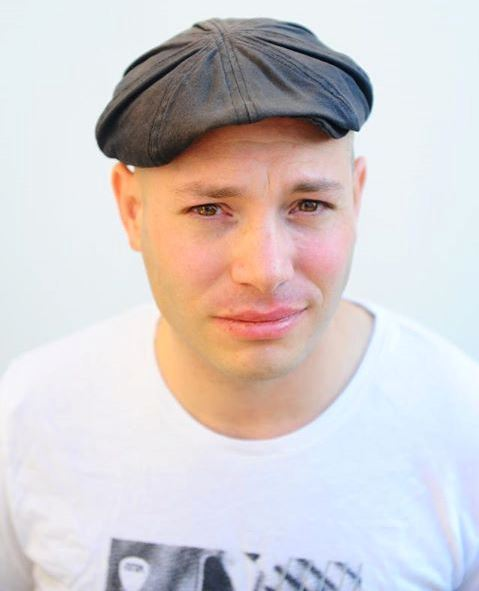

Background information
- Born: April 27, 1975 (age 50); Petah Tikva, Israel

Noam Jacobson (Hebrew: נעם יעקובסון; born April 27, 1975) is a musician, singer, songwriter, and bandleader from Ramat Gan, Israel.

== Biography ==
Jacobson was born and raised in Petah Tikva. He studied at the Nachalim Yeshiva, Amit Gush Dan, Yeshivat Har Etzion, and Yeshivat Otniel. He served in the Golani Brigade as part of a Hesder program. After his military service, he worked as a tour guide. He studied at the Rimon School of Music, and concurrently pursued a bachelor's degree in musicology at Bar-Ilan University. During his studies, he collaborated with his teacher Riki Gal, and they co-wrote the song "At the End of the Day I Need You" which was released as a single in 2018 and included on her album Seeing the Years in 2009. Later, Gal participated on Jacobson's debut solo album.

Jacobson is the lead singer and manager of the wedding band "Inyan Acher" (A Different Matter), which he founded with friends from the Rimon School of Music in 2000. The first wedding the band performed at was the daughter's wedding of Rabbi Menachem Froman, alongside Ehud Banai. In 2012, he released his first solo album titled "Arba'im Yom" (Forty Days).

At the end of 2012, he began hosting a weekly radio show called "Mishchat HaKisaot" (The Chair Game) on Galei Tzahal (Israeli Army Radio) with Matan Tzur, a member of the band Anderdos. Since 2014, he has hosted the radio show "M'Matzav?" (What's Up?) with Gadi Weissbart on Galei Tzahal.

Jacobson is a regular on the Israeli satirical television program Latma where he plays such characters as Tawil Fadiha, the “Palestinian Minister of Uncontrollable Rage,” and Rashid Hamumani, "Iranian Minister of Destruction." He is also known for playing "Captain Stabbing" in the satirical video We Con the World.

In September 2016, "STAYIN’ ALIVE" - an Israeli Satire-Comedy Show starring Jacobson and Gady Weissbart - started a world tour.
