= We Con the World =

2010 video clip

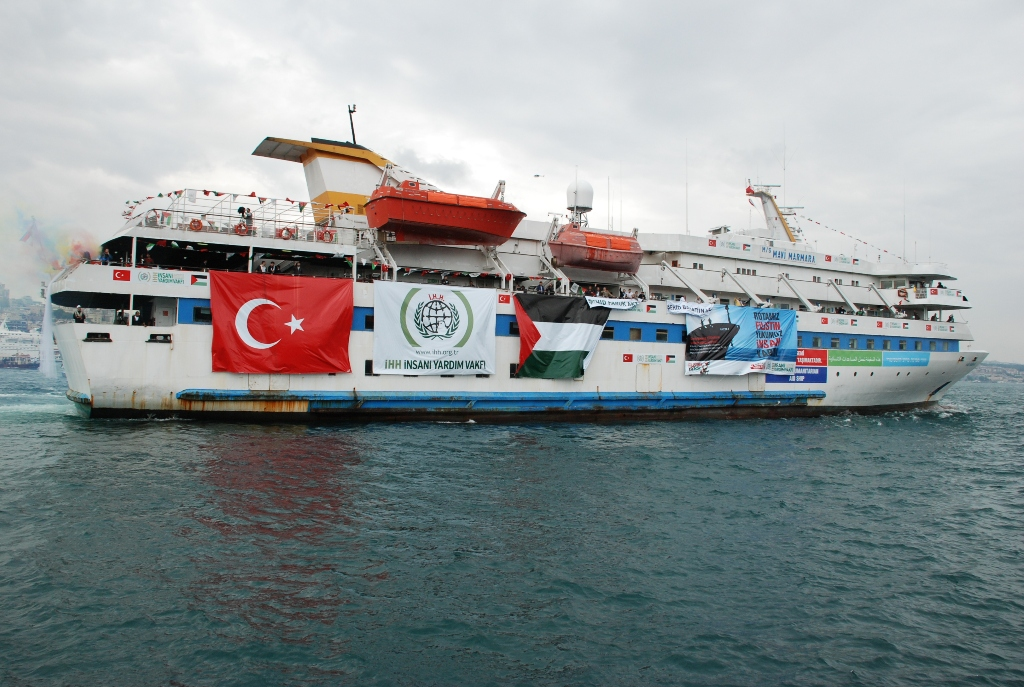
MV Mavi Marmara

We Con the World is a 2010 video clip that satirizes the purportedly peaceful intentions of the political activists aboard the Turkish-owned flagship, MV Mavi Marmara, which led the Free Gaza flotilla. The video uses the tune and style of the 1985 video "We Are the World", with actors portraying the ship's captain and passengers while waving fake weapons as they sing in criticism of the activists' attempts to "make the world abandon reason" and "ignore facts about Hamas" as they try to breach the Gaza blockade.

The video was produced in 2010 by American-Israeli Caroline Glick, a columnist for the Jerusalem Post, and Latma TV, an Israeli media satire website she edits. The website is an initiative of the Center for Security Policy, a conservative organization located in Washington, D.C. Glick makes an appearance in the chorus, wearing a keffiyeh.

== Creation ==
Latma TV director Shlomo Blass told a reporter for the Israeli newspaper Yedioth Ahronoth that he had decided to respond on the day of the 2010 Gaza flotilla raid. "I immediately called the site editor, Caroline Glick, and said to her: 'We have to do something'."

Glick described the video as a parody, featuring the "Turkish-Hamas 'love boat' captain crew and passengers in a musical explanation of how they con the world," and told the press that "We think this is an important Israeli contribution to the discussion of recent events and we hope you distribute it far and wide."

== Description ==
The video satirizes the purportedly peaceful intentions of the political activists aboard the MV Mavi Marmara, the Turkish-owned flagship that led the "blockade busting" Free Gaza Gaza flotilla. Actors portraying the ship's captain and passengers wave fake weapons as they sing, with affected Arab accents, "We'll make the world abandon reason / We'll make them all believe that the Hamas is Momma Theresa", "As Allah has shown us / For facts there's no demand". The captain of the parody crew sings "Ithbah al-Yahud" (اذبح اليهود, i.e. "Slaughter the Jews" in Arabic).

The video uses the tune and style of the 1985 video "We Are the World" by Michael Jackson and Lionel Richie.

== Response ==
Robert Mackey of the New York Times characterizes the video as "suggest[ing] that the activists on board the flotilla were, in fact, violent provocateurs." Jeff Stein of the Washington Post quotes a CIA officer who calls it "pretty clever agitprop." Writing in the Huffington Post, journalist Eileen Read called on the Jerusalem Post to fire Glick for making fun of the dead in the "blatantly racist" video.

The Israeli foreign ministry press office sent it to a list of journalists, and three hours later sent an apology describing the emailed video as having been "inadvertently released."

The spokesman for the Office of the Prime Minister of Israel, Mark Regev, told The Guardian that "I called my kids in to watch it because I thought it was funny. It is what Israelis feel. But the government has nothing to do with it."

In June 2010 David Lev wrote in an Arutz Sheva news article that the video received over three million views in less than a week. As of September 2015, the original video page showed that it had received over 2.78 million hits.

YouTube has versions with subtitles in Hebrew, Spanish, English, French, Russian, Portuguese, and Hungarian.

== Copyright controversy ==
A week after the parody appeared, it was pulled by YouTube "due to a copyright claim by Warner/ Chappell Music, Inc." Glick argued that it was legal and permissible to use copyrighted material under the fair use doctrine for purposes of parody.

Lawrence Solomon opined in the National Post that "parodies are not subject to a copyright claim" and that "YouTube carries numerous other parodies of 'We are the world' – a search on the YouTube site of 'We are the world spoof' turns up 5,100 results":

"YouTube's real problem with this viral hit is the virus of anti-Semitism. 'We con the world,' which portrays terrorists on the Gaza flotilla's ship, the MV Mavi Marmara, explaining how they'll con the world, hits too close to home for many Hamas sympathizers, who mounted a successful campaign to cow YouTube".

Several weeks after its removal the original video was restored on its channel.

== Participants ==
Caroline Glick, Noam Jacobson, Tal Gilad, Shlomo Blass, Elchanan Even-Chen, Karni Eldad, Ronit Avrahamof, Nachum Shteiner, and Yoram Schwartz participated in the video.

== See also ==
- Gaza's sky is black but Qatar is always sunny
