= Guardian of Zion Award =

The Guardian of Zion Award is an annual award given since 1997 to individuals who have been supportive of the State of Israel. It is awarded at the Ingeborg Rennert Center for Jerusalem Studies at Bar-Ilan University, where the prize recipient gives the keynote address.

Year	Recipient	Nationality	Profession	Speech
1997	Elie Wiesel	United States	Professional writer Winner of the Nobel Peace Prize (1986)	
1998	Herman Wouk	United States	Professional writer and 1952 Pulitzer Prize winner	
1999	A.M. Rosenthal	United States	Former New York Times editor Former New York Daily News columnist	
2000	Sir Martin Gilbert	United Kingdom	Historian and writer	
2001	Cynthia Ozick	United States	Professional writer	
2002	Charles Krauthammer	United States	The Washington Post columnist	
2003	Ruth Roskies Wisse	United States	Yiddish professor of Harvard University	
2004	Arthur Cohn	Switzerland	Filmmaker and writer	
2005	William Safire	United States	Author, journalist and speechwriter 1978 Pulitzer Prize winner	
2006	Daniel Pipes	United States	Author and historian	
2007	Norman Podhoretz	United States	Author, columnist	
2008	David Be'eri, Mordechai Eliav, Rabbi Yehuda Maly	Israel		
2009	Caroline Glick	Israel	Journalist	
2010	Malcolm Hoenlein	United States	Executive Vice Chairman of the Conference of Presidents of Major American Jewish Organizations	
	Dore Gold	Israel		
2012	Israel Antiquities Authority	Israel		
2013	James S. Snyder	Israel		
2017	John R. Bolton	United States	National Security Advisor	
2018	Yisrael Meir Lau	Israel		
2019	Natan Sharansky	Israel		
2022	David M. Friedman	United States	United States Ambassador to Israel	
