= Consulate General of Israel, New York City =

- Location: New York City, New York
- Address: 800 2nd Ave, New York, NY 10017
- Consul General: Ofir Akunis

The Israeli Consulate General is a consular representation of the State of Israel to the United States, located in New York City, New York.

The current consul general is Ofir Akunis, serving since May 2024.

== History ==
In June 2024, a protester was arrested after burning large Israeli and American flags in front of the consulate.

In 2025, over 10,000 Orthodox Jewish men protested against Israel's conscription laws outside the consulate, organized by the Central Rabbinical Congress.

In April 2026, the consulate launched a public diplomacy campaign in Times Square in collaboration with Israel's foreign ministry, displaying the flags of Israel and Lebanon and naming Hezbollah as preventing both countries from being at peace. The consulate had previously displayed messages in Times Square in January 2026 to commerorate International Holocaust Remembrance Day.

On July 7, 2026, the Consulate General was evacuated due to its proximity to 235 East 42nd Street, a 37-story tower undergoing residential conversion that was described as at risk of collapse.

== See also ==
- Consul-General of Israel in New York
