= Caroline Glick =

American-Israeli political figure (1969-)

- קרולין גליק
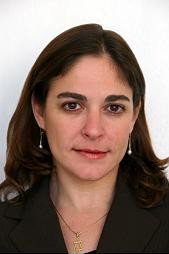
- Glick in 2009
- Born: 1969 (age 56–57); Houston, Texas, U.S.
- Education: Columbia University (B.A.); Harvard University (M.P.P.)
- Occupations: Newspaper editor, journalist, writer
- Political party: New Right (2019)
- Spouse: Shimon Suisa
- Relatives: Sister: Bonnie Glick
- Website: Official website

Caroline B. Glick (Hebrew: קרולין גליק; born 1969) is an American-Israeli conservative journalist and author who lives in Efrat. Since early 2025, she has served as an adviser on international affairs to Prime Minister of Israel Benjamin Netanyahu. She writes for Israel Hayom, Breitbart News, The Jerusalem Post, Jewish News Syndicate and Maariv. She is an adjunct senior fellow for Middle Eastern Affairs at the Washington, D.C.–based Center for Security Policy, and directs the Israeli Security Project at the David Horowitz Freedom Center.

== Early life and education ==
Glick was born in 1969 in Houston, Texas, to a Jewish family. They moved to Chicago when she was a baby, and she grew up in the Hyde Park neighborhood. She graduated from Columbia College, Columbia University, in 1991 with a Bachelor of Arts in political science.

As a teenager traveling with her parents and siblings, Glick visited Israel for the first time at the onset of the First Lebanon War. Glick immigrated to Israel in 1991, and joined the Israel Defense Forces (IDF).

Glick is the sister of American diplomat Bonnie Glick. In 2007 she married Jerusalem attorney Ephraim Katzir, but they divorced.

== Career ==
=== Military ===
Glick joined the Israel Defense Force in August 1991. She served in the IDF's Judge Advocate General division during the First Intifada in 1992, and, while there, edited and co-authored an IDF-published book, Israel, the Intifada, and the Rule of Law. Following the Oslo Accords, she worked as coordinator of negotiations with the Palestinian Authority. She retired from the military with the rank of captain at the end of 1996.

=== Government ===
After her demobilisation, Glick worked for about a year as the assistant to the director general of the Israel Antiquities Authority. She then served as assistant foreign policy advisor to Prime Minister Benjamin Netanyahu from 1997 to 1998. Glick returned to the US to earn a Master of Public Policy from Harvard Kennedy School in 2000.

In February 2025, Glick started a position as International Affairs Advisor to the Prime Minister.

In April 2023, and May June 2026, she was considered for appointment as Consul General of Israel in New York by prime minister Benjamin Netanyahu.

=== Journalism ===
Following her return to Israel, she became the chief diplomatic correspondent for the Makor Rishon newspaper, for which she wrote a weekly column in Hebrew. She was also the deputy managing editor of The Jerusalem Post, and served as senior columnist and senior contributing editor until early 2019. In the summer of 2019, Glick joined Israeli newspaper Israel Hayom, where she works as a senior columnist for its Hebrew and English editions. Her writings have appeared in The Wall Street Journal, the New York Times, National Review, The Boston Globe, the Chicago Sun-Times, Commentary magazine, The Washington Times, Maariv, Moment, and other newspapers. Glick has also contributed to many online journals. In addition to appearing on Israel's major television networks, she has appeared on US television programs on MSNBC and Fox News. She makes frequent radio appearances both in the US and Israel.

In 2003, during Operation Iraqi Freedom, Glick was embedded with the US Army's 3rd Infantry Division, and filed front-line reports for The Jerusalem Post and the Chicago Sun-Times. She also reported daily from the front lines for the Israeli Channel 1 news. Glick was present when US forces took the Baghdad International Airport. She received a Distinguished Civilian Service Award from the U.S. Secretary of the Army for her battlefield reporting.

Glick is the author of The Israeli Solution: A One State Plan for Peace in the Middle East, and Shackled Warrior: Israel and the Global Jihad. She is the adjunct senior fellow for Middle Eastern Affairs at the far-right think tank Center for Security Policy, and is one of several co-authors of the center's book, War Footing. She formerly served as senior researcher at the IDF's Operational Theory Research Institute think tank. She has also worked as an adjunct lecturer in tactical warfare at the IDF's Command and Staff College. She has been identified as part of the counter-jihad movement, and has stated that the US and Israel are fighting a "counter-jihad" against "global jihad".

In its Israeli Independence Day supplement in 2003, Israeli newspaper Maariv named her the most prominent woman in Israel. She was the 2005 recipient of the Zionist Organization of America's Ben Hecht award for Outstanding Journalism. She has also been awarded the Abramowitz Prize for Media Criticism by Israel Media Watch. A representative for the organization praised Glick's high degree of professionalism and her critical reporting, after Glick wrote a series of articles accusing the Israeli media of blatantly rallying support for carrying out the disengagement plan. On May 31, 2009, she received the Guardian of Zion Award from the Ingeborg Rennert Center for Jerusalem Studies at Bar-Ilan University.

Glick founded and edited the Hebrew language political satire website Latma TV from 2009 to 2013.

In July 2012, the David Horowitz Freedom Center announced the hiring of Glick as the Director of its Israel Security Project.

== Politics ==
In a Jerusalem Post opinion piece on the subject of the Iran nuclear agreement published on August 13, 2015, Glick characterized Jewish Americans as being at a crossroads, being threatened by President Barack Obama to risk both alienation from the Democratic Party and a weakening of the traditional Israeli-USA relationship if influential American Jewish leaders fail to support the nuclear deal.

In January 2019, she became a member of the Israeli New Right party. She was a candidate in the sixth position on the party's Knesset list for the April 2019 elections but the party didn't get enough votes to enter the Knesset.

== Reception ==
In Glick's 2014 book The Israeli Solution: A One-State Plan for Peace in the Middle East, she advocates for the annexation of the West Bank into a Jewish state without granting citizenship to much of the Palestinian population. She wrote an introductory article for the book in The Jerusalem Post. A review in the Jewish Political Studies Review called it a "solid defense of Zionism". One reviewer in the United Arab Emirates' The National was intrigued, but found the book problematic and flawed, found the author's historical account to be "mendacious", and saw the likely result of annexation as a collapse into civil war. David P. Goldman's review at the Asia Times was more favorable of Glick's one-state plan, but questioned whether it could be executed considering the demographic disaster predicted by Sergio Della Pergola. Goldman concludes, "If you read only one book about the Middle East this year, it should be Caroline Glick's".

== We Con the World ==
In June 2010, Glick co-produced and appeared in We Con the World, a satirical video by Latma TV about the Gaza Freedom Flotilla's attempt to breach the Israeli blockade of Gaza. The video clip quickly gained over 3,000,000 views from YouTube viewers, before being removed by the online hosting site due to alleged copyright infringement; Glick disputed the infringement charges, claiming a right of fair use. The video drew both criticism and praise. Writing for The Guardian, Meron Rapoport said the video was "anti-Muslim", while Eileen Read, writing for The Huffington Post, described the mocking of the flotilla crew as "tasteless and blatantly racist". Glick dismissed claims that the video is offensive, saying: "The point of satire is to make people uncomfortable. We're not trying to be fair and balanced, we're trying to make a point."

== Bibliography ==
=== Books ===
- Yahav, David; Amit-Kohn, Uzi. Edited and wrote several chapters. Israel, the Intifada and the Rule of Law. Israel Ministry of Defense Publications, 1993. ISBN 978-965-05-0693-3.
- Gaffney Jr., Frank J.; et al. Contributions to "Part IV: Waging the 'War of Ideas'". War Footing: 10 Steps America Must Take to Prevail in the War for the Free World. Naval Institute Press, 2005. ISBN 978-1-59114-301-7
- Glick, Caroline. Shackled Warrior: Israel and the Global Jihad. Gefen Publishing House, 2008. ISBN 978-965-229-415-9
- Glick, Caroline. The Israeli Solution: A One-State Plan for Peace in the Middle East. Crown Forum, 2014. ISBN 978-038-53-4806-5

=== Documentaries ===
- Glick is featured as a speaker in the documentaries Relentless: The Struggle for Peace in the Middle East and Obsession: Radical Islam's War Against the West.

== See also ==
- David Horowitz
