= Sumed pipeline =

Oil pipeline in Egypt

Sumed Pipeline
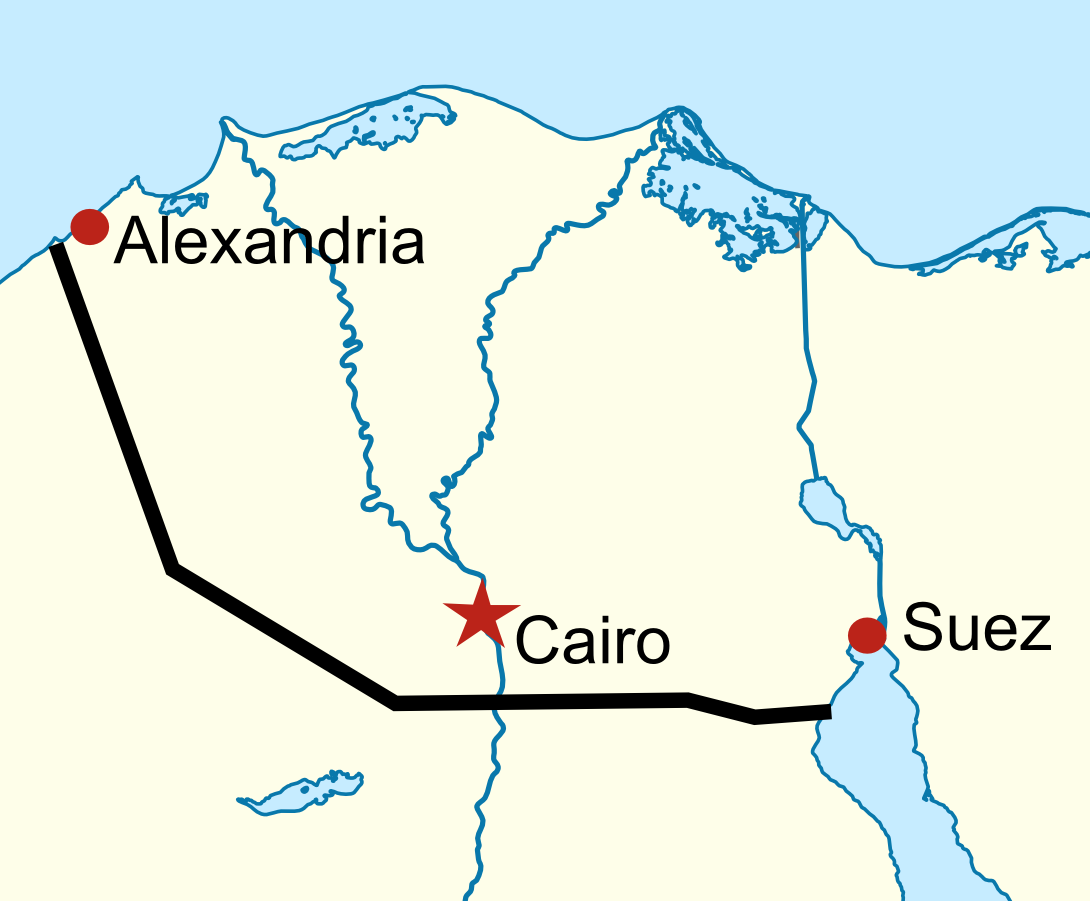
- Location of the Sumed Pipeline

Location
- Country: Egypt
- Direction: South–north
- Start: Ain Sokhna terminal
- To: Sidi Kerir port
- Runs alongside: Suez Canal

General information
- Type: Oil
- Partners: EGPC, Saudi Aramco, IPIC, three Kuwaiti companies, QatarEnergy
- Operator: Arab Petroleum Pipeline Company (Sumed Company)
- Commissioned: 1977

Technical information
- Length: 320 km (200 mi)
- Maximum discharge: 2.5 million barrels per day (400×10^{3} m^{3}/d)

The Sumed Pipeline (also known as the Suez-Mediterranean Pipeline) is an oil pipeline in Egypt, running from the Ain Sokhna terminal in the Gulf of Suez, the northernmost terminus of the Red Sea, to offshore Sidi Kerir port, Alexandria in the Mediterranean Sea. It provides an alternative to the Suez Canal for transporting oil from the Persian Gulf region to the Mediterranean.

== History ==
The project for an oil pipeline from the Red Sea to the Mediterranean commenced after the extended closure of the Suez Canal following the Six-Day War in June 1967. Establishment of the pipeline company was agreed in 1973 between five Arab governments. The Sumed pipeline was opened in 1977.

In 2009 the pipeline transported an average of 1.1 million barrels per day (170×10^{3} m^{3}/d).

== Technical description ==
The Sumed pipeline is 320 kilometres (200 mi) long. It consists of two parallel lines of 42 inches (1,070 mm) diameter. Its capacity is 2.5 million barrels per day (400×10^{3} m^{3}/d).

== Operator ==
The pipeline is owned by the Arab Petroleum Pipeline Company/Sumed Company, a joint venture of EGPC (50%, Egypt), Saudi Aramco (15%, Saudi Arabia), IPIC (15%, the United Arab Emirates), three Kuwaiti companies (each of 5%), and QatarEnergy (5%, Qatar).

== Proposed extension ==
An extension of the Sumed was being considered. The proposed extension would traverse the Red Sea from Ain Sukhna to the Saudi coast near Sharm al Sheikh, and from there to the terminal of Saudi Arabia's main east-west pipeline in Yanbu.

== See also ==
- Energy in Egypt
- Eilat-Ashkelon Pipeline
