= Eilat Ashkelon Pipeline Company =

Israeli petroleum company

- Type: Private (wholly owned by the Government of Israel)
- Industry: Petroleum
- Founded: 1968
- Defunct: 2017
- Headquarters: Ashkelon, Israel
- Area served: Israel
- Parent: Trans Asiatic Oil
- Website: www.eapc.co.il

The Eilat Ashkelon Pipeline Company (Hebrew: חברת קו צינור אילת אשקלון בע"מ (קצא"א), also known as the Europe Asia Pipeline Company and by the acronym EAPC) was a conglomerate of companies that operated several crude petroleum and refined petroleum products pipelines in Israel, most notably the Eilat–Ashkelon Pipeline – which transported crude oil across southern Israel, between the Red Sea and the Mediterranean Sea. The EAPC also operated two maritime oil terminals as well as oil storage depots in the country. The company operated under a franchise concession from 1968 to 2017, after which its activities were transferred to the Europe Asia Pipeline Company.

The company was originally formed in 1968 as a 50/50% joint venture between Israel and Iran (during the Shah's rule) to transport crude oil shipped from Iran to Europe. However, Israel effectively nationalized the company following the 1979 Iranian Revolution and the subsequent severing of relations between the two countries. In 2015, a Swiss court ordered Israel to pay Iran $1.1 billion in compensation, which Israel refused to do, arguing that this was prohibited by its Trading with the Enemy Act.

The services of the EAPC included: transporting crude oil and refined products, long-term storage, crude oil blending, processing of liquefied petroleum gas, fuel oil, distillates and gas.

Eilat Ashkelon Pipeline Company was one of Israel's most secretive companies. According to the Financial Times, "EAPC has operated since its founding under a blanket state decree that shrouds its affairs in secrecy. Israel says the decree was issued for reasons relating to national security."

== Background and founding ==
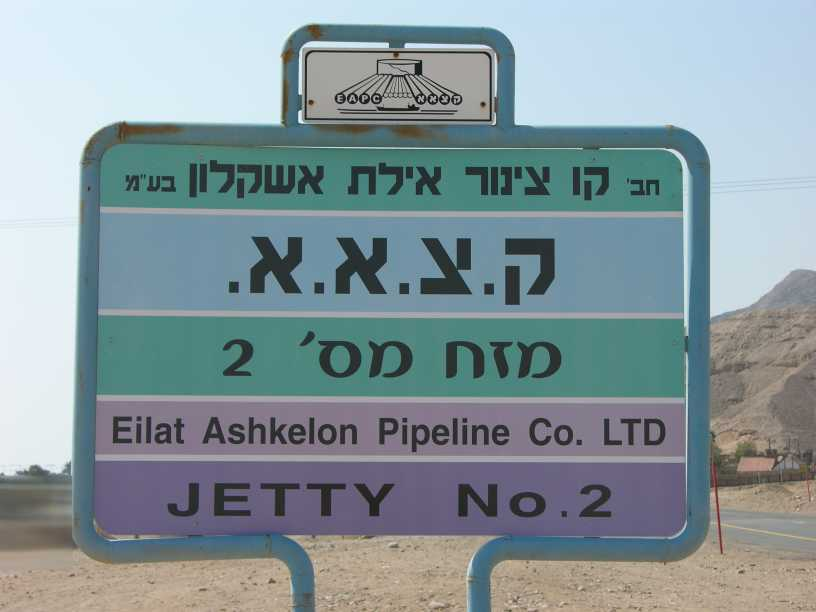
Sign for Jetty 2 in Eilat

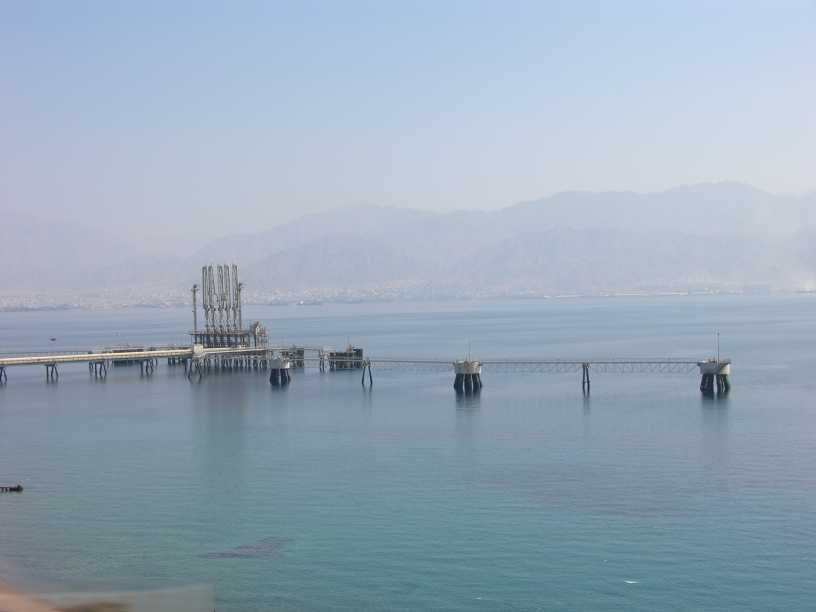
Jetty 2 in Eilat

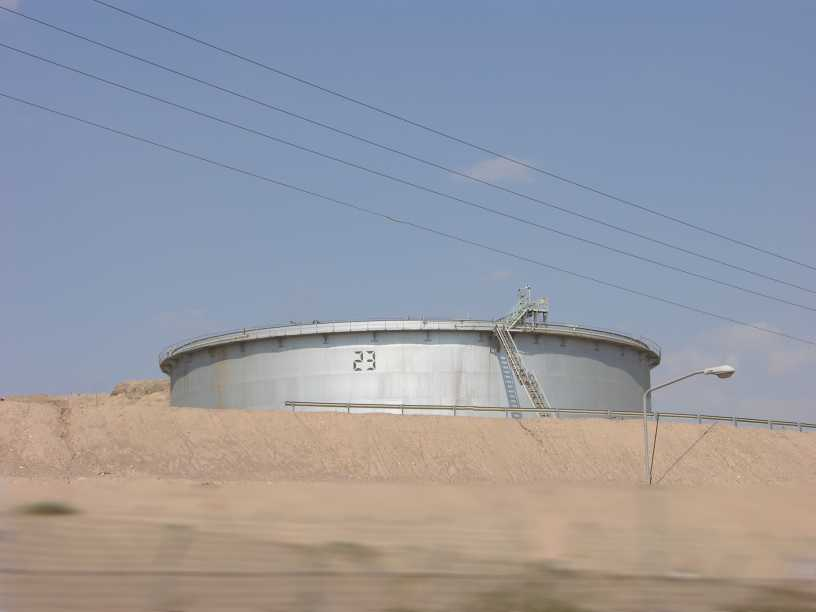
One of the storage tanks of the Ramat-Yotam tank farm

Supply of oil from Iran to Israel began in the early 1950s. From 1957, oil was transported by tanker to Eilat, and from there through a pipeline whose construction began in late 1956 and was completed in 1957 with a basic infrastructure of three tanks in Eilat and three tanks in Beersheba, and a pipeline with an 8-inch diameter between Eilat and Beersheba. From Beersheba, fuel was transported to Haifa by rail. A 16-inch pipeline was later laid from Beersheba to Ashdod, and from Ashdod the fuel was transported briefly by ship to Haifa, until a direct line to Haifa was completed in 1958.

In 1959, a franchise agreement was signed with the Eilat Pipeline Company, owned by Baron Edmond Adolphe de Rothschild, for the financing and operation of the pipeline for 49 years. The line was operated by "Fimarco" (Fimarco Anstalt), registered in the Principality of Liechtenstein, beginning in 1960. Construction of the Eilat–Haifa pipeline was carried out by Mekorot with Solel Boneh as a subcontractor. By 1965 the line was operational to Haifa at full capacity of 5 million tons per year.

In 1965, Israel sought to expand its partnership with Iran and allow Iran to export oil through Israel via a route bypassing the Suez Canal. The capacity of the existing Eilat–Haifa line was insufficient for this purpose, necessitating a new 42-inch-diameter, high-capacity pipeline. After negotiations initiated by Foreign Minister Golda Meir – who visited Iran personally – between Israeli representative Felix Shinar and Manucher Eghbal, president of the National Iranian Oil Company (NIOC), it was decided to establish an equal partnership between the Government of Israel and Israeli fuel companies Paz, Sonol, and Delek alongside the National Iranian Oil Company.

Following a loan of $22 million from Deutsche Bank, the deal was signed in Tehran in 1968. Under the contract, the partnership would last 49 years. Concurrently, a decree was issued allowing the company to operate under complete confidentiality.

In order not to embarrass Iran in the eyes of the Muslim world, several shell companies were established jointly by Israel and Iran (see Corporate structure below).

== History ==
- 1956: "Afike Neft" (Crude Oil Channel) founded to transport crude oil from Sinai to Haifa
- 1957: Construction of 3 oil tanks in Eilat, 20 cm (8") Ø pipeline from Eilat to Beersheba, 3 oil tanks in Beersheba; trains transport crude oil to Haifa; later, construction of a 40 cm (16") Ø pipeline from Beersheba to Ashdod and transportation by ship to Haifa
- 1959: Construction of a 40 cm (16") Ø pipeline from Eilat to Haifa; franchise agreement signed with Rothschild interests
- 1966: Construction of the storage facility Ramat Yotam, Eilat; Jetty 1; booster station in Paran
- 1968: EAPC established; construction of a 106 cm (42") Ø pipeline from Eilat to Ashkelon; terminal and port in Ashkelon
- 1969: Construction of the Eilat–Ashkelon Pipeline and oil ports in Eilat and Ashkelon completed; pipeline begins transporting Iranian oil to Europe
- 1970: Peak year of pipeline operation – 10 million tons of oil transported
- 1973: Storage in Eilat expanded to 1.1 million m^{3}, in Ashkelon to 1.3 million m^{3}; additional booster station in Yotvata; 45 cm (18") Ø pipeline from Ashkelon to Ashdod
- 1979: Iranian Revolution and severing of Iran–Israel relations; drop in pipeline activity; Israeli oil needs subsequently supplied via Mediterranean routes directly to refineries at Haifa and Ashdod
- 1996: Construction of a sea and land terminal for fuel oil in Ashkelon
- 1998: Construction of a modern LPG terminal
- 1999: Joint venture between EAPC and Petroleum & Energy Infrastructures Ltd. (PEI); distillates unloaded in Ashkelon and distributed/pumped by PEI
- 2000: Marine services in Ashkelon moved to the Israel Electric Company's (IEC) Rutenberg Power Station's coal jetty
- 2002: Conversion of storage tanks for distillates; filling station for tanker lorries
- 2003: Reverse flow project completed (allowing Russian oil delivered by tankers to Ashkelon to be reloaded onto tankers in Eilat for shipment to Asia)
- 2004: Modern filling plant for LPG cylinders
- 2017: Expiration of 49-year franchise concession; activities transferred to the Europe Asia Pipeline Company
- 2020: Agreement reached with the UAE to transport Emirati oil from the Red Sea to the Mediterranean

== Corporate structure ==
To avoid embarrassing Iran in the eyes of the Muslim world, several shell companies were established jointly by Israel and Iran.

=== Fimarco Anstalt ===
Fimarco Anstalt was established in 1959 in Liechtenstein. It was owned by Baron Edmond Adolphe de Rothschild and was originally created as part of the earlier 16-inch pipeline project from Eilat to Haifa (which predated the 42-inch EAPC pipeline). Rothschild financed its construction together with additional partners in exchange for a 49-year franchise agreement, signed on July 17, 1959, which included an investment of $24 million. In 1968, this line also passed to the Eilat Ashkelon Pipeline Company after Rothschild declined to invest in the new pipeline and demanded compensation for harm to the existing line. This company appears to have passed to Iranian ownership as part of the agreement to establish the Eilat–Ashkelon line.

=== APC Holdings ===
APC Holdings was established in December 1967 in Canada. It held the government franchise to operate the oil pipeline from Eilat to Ashkelon. Under the terms of the franchise deed, APC Holdings was to establish EAPC as an Israeli sub-licensee. The company's chairman represented the Government of Iran and was appointed by the Israeli Minister of Finance; he also served as a senior supervisor on the EAPC board of directors. The first chairman was Yisrael Kozlov, who signed the franchise deed in March 1968 alongside Finance Minister Pinchas Sapir.

=== Trans Asiatic Oil ===
Trans Asiatic Oil (TAO) was established in 1967 in Panama with the purpose of transporting and marketing oil in international markets. Trans Asiatic acquired the Rothschild interests in the Beersheba pipeline and laid alongside it a larger pipeline – one meter in diameter – from Eilat to Ashkelon, where loading and unloading terminals were also constructed; terminal construction was completed in 1969.

Trans Asiatic established a subsidiary, the Eilat–Ashkelon Oil Pipeline Company (EAPC), which owned the two pipelines and tank farms for oil storage in Ashkelon and Eilat. The company chartered a fleet of 23 tankers in order to pump tens of millions of tons of oil per year. The National Iranian Oil Company sold oil to Trans Asiatic at below-market prices and extended three-month credit. Tankers loaded oil at Iranian ports, sailed to Eilat, where cargo was unloaded at the terminal and pumped through the pipeline to Ashkelon. Most of it was then loaded onto tankers bound for Europe; a small portion served Israel's own energy needs.

==== Eilat Corporation S.A. ====
Trans Asiatic Oil is owned by Eilat Corporations S.A., registered in Panama on December 22, 1967, with its shares held by two Panamanian citizens. The company is managed by the Israeli Accountant General.

== Pipelines ==
=== Crude oil pipelines ===
- Eilat port – Ashkelon port (Eilat Ashkelon Pipeline), 254 km, Ø 106 cm (42"), max 60 million tons per year, 3 booster stations (Yotvata, Paran, Mashabei Sadeh)
- Ashkelon port – Haifa Refinery at Haifa port, 197 km, Ø 40 cm (16/18"), 3 pumping stations (Givati, Glilot, Hadera), max 5.5 million tons per year
- Ashkelon port – Ashdod Refinery, 36 km, Ø 40 cm (18/16"), max 7 million tons per year

=== Products pipeline ===
- Eilat port – Giv'ati – Haifa Refinery, 260 km, Ø 40 cm (16"), distillates (gasoline, jet fuel, gasoil)

=== Bidirectional reverse flow project ===
This project reversed the flow direction of the Eilat–Ashkelon pipeline, meaning that oil can flow southwards as well as northwards. The original northward-only design reflected Israel's consumption of Iranian oil. The concept behind the reversal was to transport crude oil from Russia, Central Asian republics, and the Caucasus through the Black Sea or the Baku–Tbilisi–Ceyhan pipeline to Southern Asia and the Far East at a competitive price, bypassing the capacity-limited and expensive Suez Canal. The project was completed in 2003; however, efforts to market Azerbaijani oil to Asian customers ultimately failed.

- Ashkelon port – Eilat port, 254 km, Ø 106 cm (42"), max 20 million tons per year, 2 booster stations

== Oil ports ==
- Eilat: storage capacity 1.2 million m^{3}, for tankers up to 500,000 tonnes deadweight (DWT), 16 storage tanks
- Ashkelon: storage capacity 1.5 million m^{3}, for tankers up to 300,000 DWT, 22 storage tanks

== Legal status ==
=== Oil Pipeline Franchise Law ===
EAPC was a private company in the joint ownership of Israel and the Government of Iran, with Iran defined as a "silent partner." Upon its establishment it was granted a 49-year franchise under the Oil Pipeline Franchise Law of 1968. The law exempted it from income tax, municipal rates, and lease fees, and from the requirement to hold public tenders – all within its areas of activity.

In 1986, a few months after Iran initiated arbitration proceedings against Israel, an amendment was fast-tracked to the Law on Supervision of Commodities and Services, allowing the Minister of Finance to manage a government or mixed company – or a subsidiary thereof – "engaged or intended to engage in a matter in which the state has a vital economic interest" by appointing a "special supervisor." This effectively allowed Israel to nationalize EAPC in practice without altering the franchise agreement or the corporate structure. The first special supervisor was Yehuda Drori.

=== Secrecy decree ===
Under a decree of July 17, 1968, all information relating to the Eilat–Ashkelon oil pipeline, including investments in the pipeline, operations, fuel sources, and uses – including sales to foreign parties – was declared a state secret, unless publication was authorized by the Minister of Finance. Accordingly, the company refrained from publishing financial statements, and data on its business activities was classified. The company also refrained from publishing appointments and safety measures, and was not subject to full public scrutiny by the State Comptroller.

On March 27, 2016, the government issued an updated secrecy decree covering all information relating to the Eilat–Ashkelon Pipeline Company, Trans Asiatic Oil Ltd., and Eilat Corporations S.A. – including shareholder identities, oil transactions, valuations, and management arrangements – except for information relating exclusively to environmental matters, planning and construction, business licensing, and the Eilat-Ashkelon Infrastructure Services Company (SHATA'A).

== Iran–Israel arbitration ==
=== Background ===
About two months before Ayatollah Khomeini rose to power, the National Iranian Oil Company ceased selling oil to Trans Asiatic Oil. As a result, Trans Asiatic sold tankers, laid off workers, and closed offices. Despite the cessation of operations, Iran refused to dissolve the partnership in an orderly manner.

In 1981, the National Iranian Oil Company filed a claim against Israel demanding half of EAPC's assets. The dispute was litigated for more than three decades in courts and arbitration proceedings in Europe. Israel lost in two proceedings; a third was still ongoing as of the company's dissolution.

The journal Global Arbitration Review estimated the total value of sums at issue in the arbitration proceedings at seven billion dollars.

=== Issues in dispute ===
1. The "small arbitration": An indirect debt of Israeli fuel companies Paz, Sonol, and Delek, estimated (in 1979 values) at one hundred million dollars. Company SPTM (known as Sopetrol, established in Geneva in 1955 and struck from the companies register in 1999) sold crude oil to the Israeli fuel companies; Iran alleged they did not pay. In 2004, the fuel companies were ordered to pay compensation to the Iranian national oil company. These proceedings were conducted in France and later moved to Switzerland.
2. The "large arbitration": A direct debt of Trans Asiatic Oil, arising from oil deliveries on three-month credit. Before the Islamic Revolution, Fimarco Anstalt purchased on credit 14.75 million tons of oil worth $450 million (in 1979 values). In 1989 a Swiss court ordered the company to pay $500 million. In 2015, arbitration proceedings conducted in Zurich concluded with a decision requiring Israel to pay $1.1 billion to Iran.
3. The "other arbitration": Funds held in joint bank accounts; Iran alleged that Israel had taken over property and assets including infrastructure and a tanker fleet.

=== Key arbitration timeline ===
- 1968: Participation agreement signed between Finance Minister Pinchas Sapir and NIOC President Manucher Eghbal; disputes to be resolved by mutual appointment of arbitrators, or by the president of the International Chamber of Commerce in Paris if deadlock
- 1979: Iranian Revolution; severance of diplomatic relations
- 1981: NIOC files claim against Israel demanding half of EAPC assets
- 1984: Israeli Accountant General opens a special account at the Bank of Israel holding funds deposited by the fuel companies (initially $125 million, later $350 million)
- 1989: Swiss court orders Trans Asiatic to pay $500 million; Israel represented by Haim Zadok
- 1994: Iran appoints its arbitrator in the large arbitration; requests Israel to appoint a counter-arbitrator
- 1999: Israel invokes the "Trading with the Enemy" ordinance to withdraw funds from the special bank account; Finance Minister Beiga Shochat appoints accountant-general as custodian of enemy assets
- 2001: French Court of Appeals compels Israel to appoint an arbitrator; Iranian tribunal in the small arbitration orders Sopetrol and the three Israeli companies to pay $97 million
- 2004: NIOC files claim for $800 million (half the value of assets under the participation agreement)
- 2011: Finance Minister Yuval Steinitz signs a "Trading with the Enemy" order designating Iran an enemy state
- 2013: Swiss court rejects Israel's procedural challenges; Israel ordered to pay CHF 250,000 in costs to Iran plus CHF 200,000 to the court
- 2014: Swiss Supreme Court rejects Israel's appeal in the small arbitration; Israel ordered to pay additional costs
- 2015: Two of the three arbitrators in the large arbitration order Trans Asiatic to pay $1.2 billion for 50 pre-revolution oil shipments plus $362 million in interest; Israel's 2004 counterclaim dismissed; Israel awarded $99 million on a separate supply claim
- 2016: Trans Asiatic's appeal rejected; ordered to pay CHF 450,000
- 2017: End of franchise concession period

== Environmental incidents and legal proceedings ==
=== Nahal Zin fuel leak ===
In June and September 2011, a serious contamination of Nahal Zin and its surroundings occurred as a result of a fuel leak from the company's jet fuel pipeline. An indictment was filed against the company and several of its senior executives in January 2016. In February 2022, the company was convicted of two counts of aggravated water pollution, two counts of illegal waste disposal, and one count of causing an unreasonable odor. The company's CEO at the time of the incident, Yair Vida, and two additional employees were convicted of water pollution offenses and of breach of duty as officeholders to supervise and prevent violations of the Clean Environment Law. The company was fined NIS 1.6 million, and the three senior executives were personally fined between NIS 75,000 and NIS 150,000.

=== Evrona Nature Reserve oil spill ===
On December 3, 2014, an oil spill from an EAPC pipeline caused severe contamination of the Evrona Nature Reserve. The incident triggered sharp criticism of the company. The Ministry of Environmental Protection and the Tavor Economics and Finance company estimated damage to the nature reserve at approximately NIS 111 million, later revised upward to NIS 216 million in ecological damage and NIS 65 million in rehabilitation costs. Four class action lawsuits were filed and consolidated into a single suit worth hundreds of millions of shekels. In November 2019, the State Attorney's Office reached a settlement agreement under which the company was required to pay NIS 100 million, including NIS 32 million already spent on conservation and research at the reserve. In November 2021, an indictment was filed against EAPC and three of its senior officials for contaminating the reserve; the indictment determined that the three bore "responsibility for the failures and omissions that caused the ecological damage, among the greatest to have occurred in the State."

=== Eilat coral reef damage ===
On September 15, 2015, a serious indictment was filed against EAPC for unauthorized activity that caused severe damage to approximately 2,600 corals in the Gulf of Eilat. On June 12, 2022, a court approved a civil settlement between the Ministry of Justice and EAPC, under which the company paid NIS 250,000 toward reef restoration in exchange for dismissal of the civil suit. EAPC was also convicted separately in criminal proceedings for damage to protected natural values, and fined accordingly.

== State Comptroller criticism ==
The State Comptroller's report of October 2013 alleged "audit findings indicating improper conduct not in accordance with the law." According to the report, the Israel Land Authority transferred land to developers without compensation. The land was held by EAPC under a permissive use arrangement but was transferred to the Dorad company for the purpose of constructing a power station, without a tender. Additionally, in 2004 the Director General of the Ministry of Defense, Amos Yaron, signed an agreement to purchase electricity from Dorad, and subsequently in 2008 – upon being appointed chairman of EAPC – signed a development agreement between the land authority and the company.

Additional comptroller reports were barred from publication by the Military Censor.

== See also ==
- Iran–Israel relations
- Nahal Zin fuel leak – 2011 ecological disaster from an EAPC pipeline
- Trans-Israel pipeline
