= Consul-General of Israel in New York =

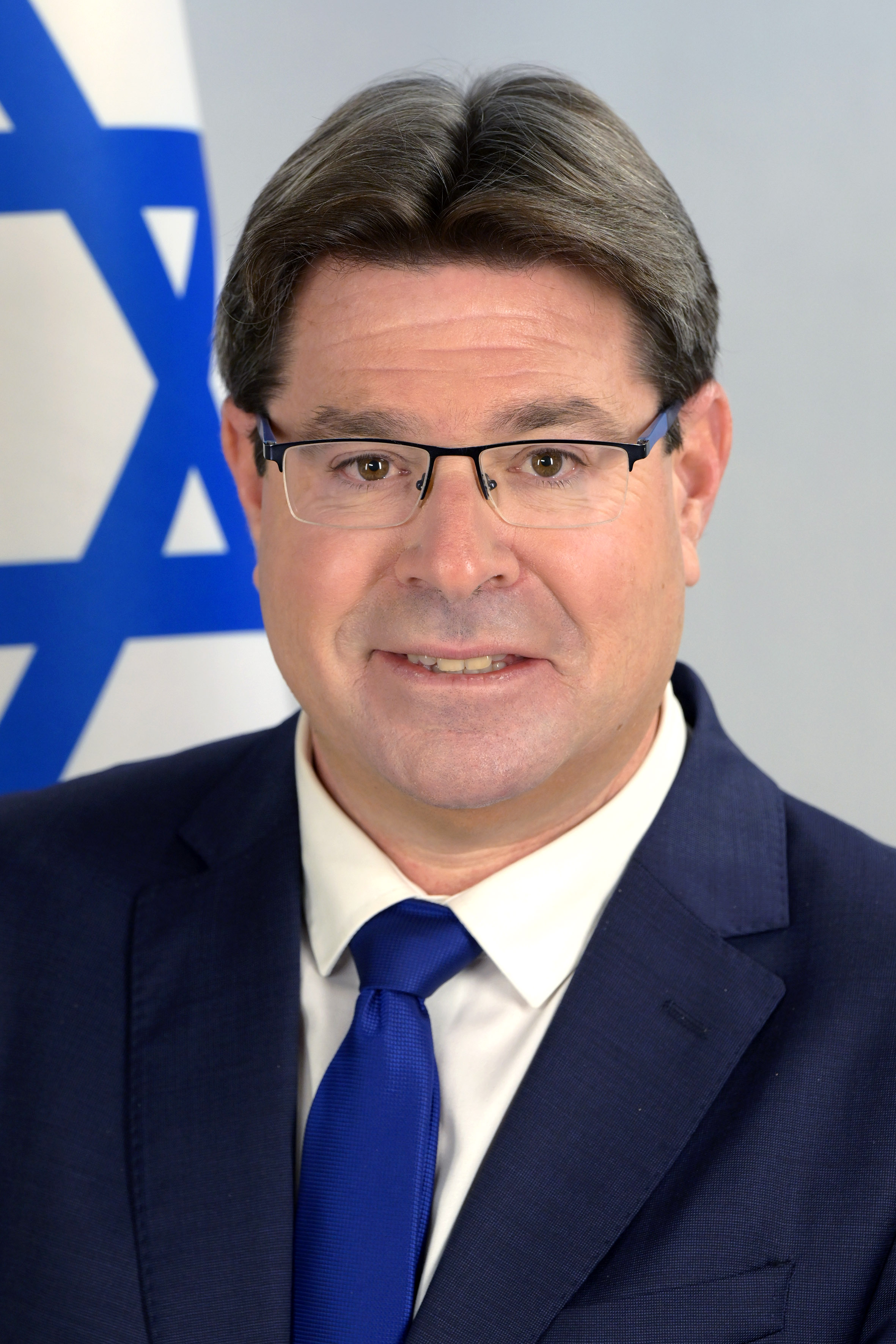
- Incumbent; Ofir Akunis since May 2024
- Appointer: Prime Minister of Israel
- First holder: Arthur Lourie

The consul-general of Israel in New York is in charge of the Israeli Consulate General and represents the State of Israel to New York, New Jersey, Pennsylvania, Ohio, and Delaware. The position has been described as "central to relations with American Jewish organizations, political leaders, universities, donors, media outlets, and public diplomacy in the United States".

The current consul-general is Ofir Akunis, appointed in 2024.

== Background ==
In May 2026 The Jerusalem Post described the position as "one of Israel's most sensitive diplomatic posts", with Democrats MK Gilad Kariv writing "The Israeli consulate in New York is the true embassy of Israel to the Jews of America." It is considered Israel's third most important diplomatic position in the United States, after the ambassadors to Washington and the United Nations.

== History ==
In November 2025, Israel joined the Society of Foreign Consuls in New York, which includes countries with whom it does not maintain diplomatic relations.

== See also ==
- Consulate General of Israel, New York City
- List of consuls general of Israel to the United States
