= Ofir Akunis =

Israeli politician and diplomat

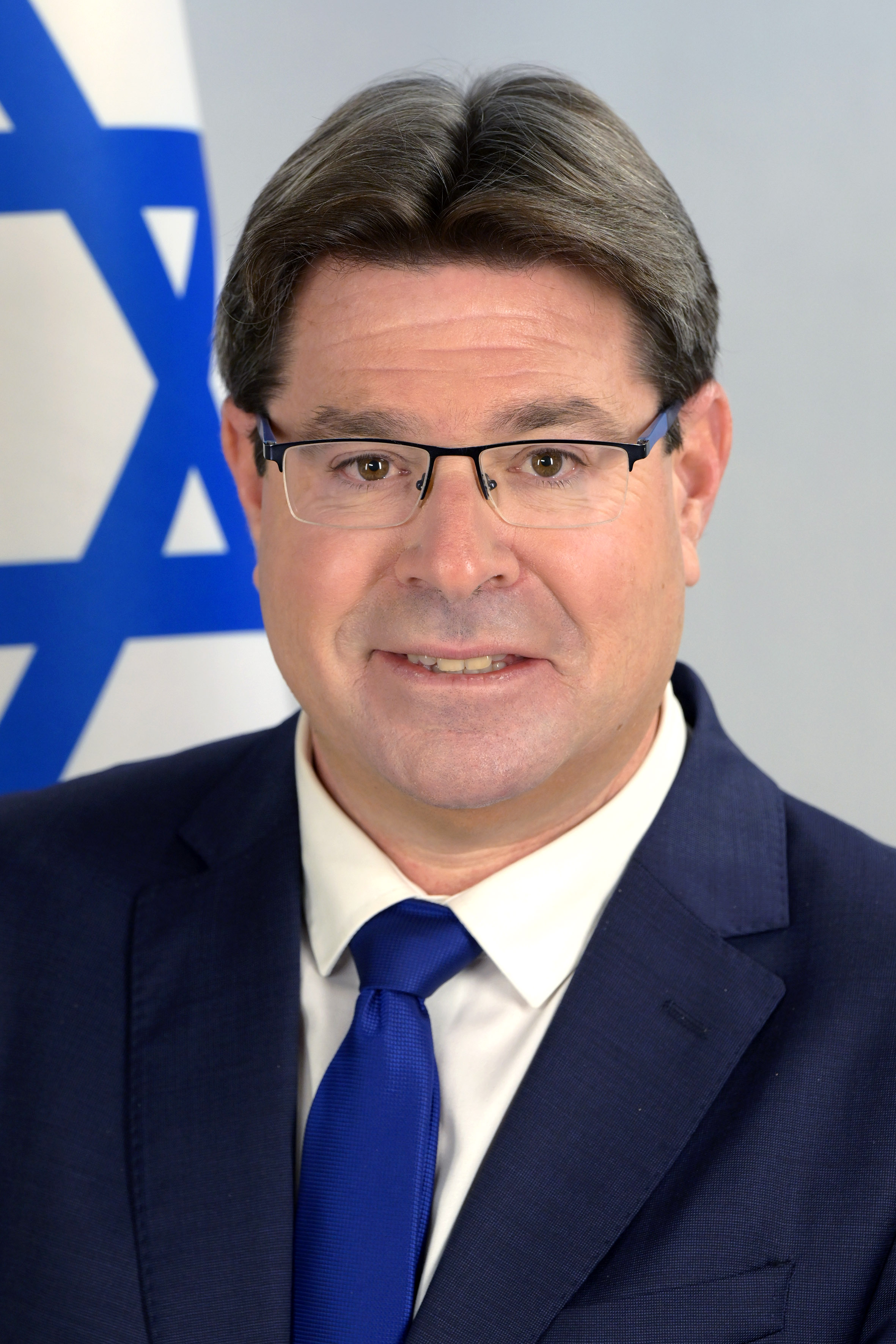
- Akunis in 2023

Ministerial roles
- 2015: Minister without Portfolio
- 2015–2020: Minister of Science & Technology
- 2020: Minister of Labor, Social Affairs and Social Services
- 2020–2021: Minister of Regional Cooperation
- 2022–2024: Minister of Science & Technology

Faction represented in the Knesset
- 2009–2024: Likud

Diplomatic roles
- 2024–: Consul General in New York

Personal details
- Born: 28 May 1973 (age 53) Tel Aviv, Israel

Ofir Akunis (Hebrew: אוֹפִיר אָקוּנִיס; born 28 May 1973) is an Israeli politician, diplomat, and member of the Likud party. Since May 2024 he has been the Israeli Consul General in New York, his first diplomatic posting. As a politician, Akunis served as a member of the Knesset for Likud and was the Minister of Science and Technology from 2015 to 2020 and from 2022 to 2024. He previously held the posts of Minister of Labor, Social Affairs and Social Services in 2020 and Minister of Regional Cooperation in 2020–2021.

== Biography ==
=== Early life ===
Akunis was born in Tel Aviv. His grandfather was a Greek-Jew who immigrated to Israel from Saloniki in 1934 and was a member of the Likud Party himself. His mother immigrated to Israel from Poland in 1957. He attended the Herzliya Hebrew High School between 1987 and 1991 and served as youth correspondent for the weekly "Ma'ariv LaNoar" magazine.

Akunis' mandatory military service was spent as a correspondent for the Chief Education Officer of the Education and Youth Corps. After his army service he served as music editor of the radio program "Youth Club" on Reshet Gimmel and on other programs. He completed a bachelor's degree in political science and international relations at the Open University.

In January 1992, he joined the Likud Party and began working in the information department at the party headquarters at Metzudat Ze'ev in Tel Aviv. In June 1996, Akunis was named deputy media advisor to newly elected Prime Minister Binyamin Netanyahu and was later named spokesman for the Likud Party. In 2003 he won the Menachem Begin Award for his thesis "Morals and Realism in Israeli Politics". He later worked as a spokesman for the Minister of Justice, and in 2004 was appointed media advisor for Netanyahu when the latter served as finance minister.

Akunis continued to serve as Netanyahu's advisor until 2008 when he was appointed deputy director of communications and information for the Likud.

=== The 18th Knesset ===
Prior to the 2009 elections, Akunis participated in the primaries for the Likud and reached the 28th place. He submitted a petition to the election committee of the Likud together with other candidates. On 12 December 2008 the petition was accepted, and subsequently was promoted to the 26th place on the list, which is reserved for the Tel Aviv district. Post factum, it turned out that if the petition was not accepted, he would not have been elected to the Knesset, as the Likud won 27 mandates in the elections. Akunis was subsequently moved up to twenty-sixth place, and entered the Knesset as Likud won 27 seats.

During his first two years as a Knesset member, Ofir Akunis served as Chairman of the Economic Committee. He was also appointed Deputy Speaker of the House. After the flotilla to Gaza, Ofir Akunis confronted the Knesset members of the Balad party several times, and even announced several times that as the Likud's representative to the Central Elections Committee he would demand the disqualification of their list and the disqualification of MK Haneen Zoabi, who participated in the flotilla. After recruiting a majority of 19 supporters against 9 opponents, the Central Elections Committee disqualified Zoabi from running for the 19th Knesset. During a pre-vote debate, Akunis said, "Zoabi did not stop undermining the State of Israel, and openly incited against it and against IDF soldiers. She participated in the flotilla, do you need any more than that to disqualify her candidacy?" After a few days, the Supreme Court overturned the decision. According to the statistics of the Knesset Ofir Akunis is considered a very active member, both in the Knesset plenum and in the committees in which he participates.

==== Economic Committee Activities ====
During his service as Chairman of the Economic Committee, Ofir Akunis collaborated with the Minister of Communications Moshe Kahlon in opening the cellular communications market to competition, including supporting a decrease in link fees and adding virtual operators and new companies to this market. He promoted the consumer cash refund law and initiated the reverse interest law. In the television sector he promoted legislation regulating the transition from franchises to licenses, and initiated the increase of channels broadcast free of charge by the "Idan+" DDT broadcasting service. He objected to the Ministry of Finance's demand to increase radio and television fees, and actually lead to its decrease.

In discussions led by the committee on state royalties on oil and gas profits, Akunis objected to the new fund's initiative to increase royalties to 80%. However, after the publication of the Shinsky Committee's recommendations, the Knesset voted in favor of the "Oil Profit Tax Law."

=== The 19th Knesset ===
In 2013 Akunis placed 18th on the Likud Party's election slate for the 19th Knesset, but was dropped to number 29 after the party decided to run on a joint ticket with the Yisrael Beteinu party. Nevertheless, Akunis was re-elected and appointed Deputy Minister in the Prime Minister's Office, acting as the liaison between the government and the Knesset with the portfolio of the Advancement of Young People and Students. As the liaison between the government and the Knesset, Akunis responded to opposition-sponsored motions of no confidence on behalf of the government. He also spoke much about "Prawer plan," negotiations with the Palestinians and with Israeli towns in the disputed territories. .

==== Deputy Minister of Environmental Protection ====
On 9 December 2014, Akunis was appointed Deputy Minister of Environmental Protection. Akunis replaced Amir Peretz, who resigned from his post as Minister. The appointment, made by the Prime Minister Benjamin Netanyahu's office, came a week after the massive crude oil spill in Israel's Arava region. Akunis said that "it is the Deputy Minister's intention to prioritize treatment of the ecological disaster in the south and to do all that is necessary to prevent the spread of the crude oil, and to prevent a health and environmental disaster." Akunis ordered crews to raise the side walls of the dams that had been built in the Arava to prevent flooding. Thanks to the infrastructure that had already been built in the area, the risk that the oil would reach the Gulf of Eilat significantly dropped. Akunis instructed that the reserve remain closed as long as high values of pollutants were still registered in air quality tests. In the end of December, the government approved a NIS 17 million Environment Ministry plan to rehabilitate. According to Akunis, the NIS 17 million program would serve to treat the soils contaminated by the spill as well as help restore the wildlife populations damaged over the course of the event. As part of the plan, a special team would be appointed to evaluate the environmental impact of various Eilat-Ashkelon Pipeline Company activities on both dry land and beaches. The approved plan also involved opening a closed Eilat beach on EAPC-owned property to the city's residents and visitors. In January 2015, Air quality tests found that there has been a 90% reduction of pollution in Evrona. In July 2017, the beach opened as promised.

==== "Computer for Every Child" ====
For his own request, Akunis was appointed by Binyamin Netanyahu to lead the 'Computer for Every Child' project. He said that "This is one of the most important social projects taking place in Israel," and added "that reducing the technological gaps is a critical element in reducing social disparities." Akunis promised that he will work to "promote, strengthen and upgrade" the project. During 2013, the project has been upgraded from "Computer for Every Child" to "Tablet for the Whole Classroom" and Tablets Distributed to Children of Sderot, Ofakim, Lod etc. In October 2014, Akunis announced that the government had allocated NIS 1.8 million to provide tablets for each and every child living in the south.

=== The 20th Knesset ===
Prior to the 2015 elections, Akunis participated in the primaries for the Likud and reached the 15th place.

On 14 May 2015 Akunis was sworn in as a Minister in the 34th Government of Israel.

In June 2015, Akunis was authorized by the Prime Minister to be the Broadcasting Authority and the Second Television and Radio Authority. After his appointment, Bezeq led to changes in the Public Broadcasting Law. The changes included renaming the law to the "Israeli Public Broadcasting Law" and final cancellation of the television fee. These changes were criticized by his predecessor, Minister Gilad Erdan, and received support from the Ministry of Finance and The New General Workers Union.

Following a controversy with the Prime Minister, he resigned as head of the Broadcasting Authority and the Second Television and Radio Authority.

Minister of Science and Technology

On 2 September 2015, Akunis was appointed Ministry of Science and Technology replacing Danny Danon who was appointed Israel's envoy to the United Nations.

Akunis served twice as Minister of Innovation, Science and Technology from 2015 to 2020, and from 2022 to 2024. During his first term, he led significant reforms aimed at expanding technology access to all Israeli citizens, especially in underserved communities and the periphery.

Throughout his tenure, he signed 30 international agreements to strengthen cooperation between Israel and other states, including the US, the UK, India, Japan, China, Argentina and many others.

In 2018, in honor of Israel's 70th Independence Day, he initiated and led a first-of-its-kind international conference in Jerusalem, attended by about 30 delegations from around the world, most led by the science ministers of their respective countries.

In July 2018, Akunis refused to approve a recommendation from his office to appoint Professor Yael Amitai to the Board of Governors of the German-Israeli Foundation for Scientific Research and Development, stating that in 2005 Amitai signed a petition supporting the refusal to serve in the territories. The academy was harshly criticized for this decision, but Akunis adhered to his decision. Prof. Amitai and the heads of universities filed a petition with the High Court against this decision by Akunis. The Attorney General and the State Attorney's Office filed suit against Akunis, but at the court hearing he continued to hold his position. Due to opposition from the Attorney General to give Akunis an outside legal representation, he decided to represent himself in court and appeared at every Supreme Court hearing and argued before the panel. Amitai eventually accepted the appointment of Akunis' replacement, Izhar Shay.

In 2019, he oversaw Israel's Beresheet Mission to the Moon in partnership with the Israeli Space Agency and SpaceIL.

In January 2020, he was appointed Minister of Labor, Welfare and Social Services instead of the Prime Minister.

=== The 23rd Knesset ===
On the 35th day of the new Israeli government (in 2020), Prime Minister Benjamin Netanyahu announced that Akunis would be appointed Minister of Regional Cooperation while Gilad Erdan, who held the position before Akunis, was appointed Israeli Ambassador to the United Nations.

From 2020 to 2021, Akunis served as Israel's Minister of Regional Cooperation. Under his watch, Israel signed the historic Abraham Accords peace agreements with the UAE, Bahrain, Sudan and Morocco, as well as Kosovo. And at his initiative, the ministry sent the first-ever municipal delegation of Israel's Jewish and Arab mayors to the UAE, at the invitation of their Minister of International Cooperation, Reem Al Hashimy. Akunis also hosted the first Bahraini trade delegation to Israel, led by Bahrain's Minister of Industry, Commerce and Tourism, Zayed Al-Zayani.

In 2021, Akunis established the Knesset's Abraham Accords Caucus, the first of its kind, serving as a model for parliaments around the world. The caucus's launch in the Knesset was attended by, among others, Jared Kushner, Ivanka Trump and Israeli Prime Minister Benjamin Netanyahu.

=== The 24th Knesset ===
Akunis was suggested as the Minister of Justice after the Supreme Court demanded that the empty post of Justice Minister be filled within 48 hours. A vote in the cabinet on this nomination was ruled illegal by Attorney General Avichai Mandelblit and also the Israeli Supreme Court. When Benny Gantz was subsequently approved by the cabinet in a legal vote, Akunis abstained from voting as a form of protest.

He was the Minister of Science and Technology from 2022 to 2024.

=== Diplomatic career ===
On 1 May 2024, Akunis began service as the Israeli Consul General in New York, his first diplomatic posting. Akunis was appointed by Israeli Prime Minister Benjamin Netanyahu and his nomination was approved with unanimous consent by the Israeli cabinet.

Akunis has criticized the administration of Mayor Zohran Mamdani. In January 2026, Mamdani cancelled two executive orders, one barring city agencies from boycotting Israel, and defining certain criticisms of Israel as antisemitic. Akunis said that the decisions presented "an immediate threat to the safety of Jewish communities in New York City and could lead to an increase in violent antisemitic attacks throughout the city."

In response to Mamdani's decision to not attend the Israel Day on Fifth parade in honor of Israeli Independence Day, Akunis said "This is the very first year that the mayor of New York has refused to recognize the State of Israel as the homeland of the Jewish people," adding “the Jewish people and the State of Israel do not need your recognition." Akunis also criticized Mamdani's commemoration of Nakba Day.

In May 2026, the Council of Jewish Organizations of Staten Island and the Joan & Alan Bernikow Jewish Community Center designated 18 May 2026 as “The Hon. Ofir Akunis Day”. Akunis conducted a borough-wide tour of Staten Island earlier in the month. In a meeting with Jewish community representatives in the borough, Akunis said that “The state of antisemitism in the world is the worst since the end of World War II, and in New York City since the beginning of Jewish settlement here," adding, "The waving of Hezbollah and Hamas flags has become routine here at every demonstration. The mayor not only fails to curb these phenomena, but fuels the fire and violence with false videos and statements, such as the one he spread about the ‘Nakba.’ Do not let fake smiles mislead you."

Following a stabbing at the Central Synagogue in Manhattan, Akunis inaccurately claimed that Mamdani's rhetoric had incited the attack. Akunis posted that “The attack at Manhattan’s Central Synagogue is a direct result of Mayor Mamdani’s sustained campaign of incitement. I warned that words would turn into actions, and that is exactly what is happening.” The perpetrator of the stabbing was a supporter of Israel who had posted content critical of Mamdani on social media.

== Personal life ==
Akunis is married to Adi and father of their two children. He is a resident of Tel Aviv-Yafo.
