= Normalization agreement =

Normalization agreement may refer to:

- Bahrain–Israel normalization agreement
- Israel–Morocco normalization agreement
- Israel–Sudan normalization agreement
- Israel–United Arab Emirates normalization agreement

== See also ==
- Abraham Accords
- Arab–Israeli normalization
- Kosovo and Serbia economic normalization agreements (2020)
