= Arab–Israeli alliance =

Diplomatic rapprochement between Israel and Arab monarchies

Alleged members of the Arab–Israeli alliance shown in dark green

The Arab–Israeli alliance is an unofficial security coalition comprising Israel and various Arab countries primarily focused on deterring the political and military ambitions of Iran. It has been actively promoted by the United States since the February 2019 Warsaw conference. It is sometimes referred to as the Israeli–Sunni alliance, due to the Arab countries allegedly in it being predominantly Sunni states, while Iran and much of the Axis of Resistance are predominantly Shia. The coalition has also been referred to as the Abraham Alliance or Abrahamic Alliance, after the biblical character Abraham, revered by both Jews and Muslims.

== History ==
The roots of the informal alliance started in the 2000s, due to the decreasing importance of the Israeli–Palestinian conflict as a wedge issue and mutual tensions with Iran. By 2016, Gulf Cooperation Council states had sought strengthened economic and security cooperation with Israel, which is involved in its own proxy conflict with Iran. The de facto coalition emerged by November 2017, upon warming ties between Israel and the Gulf States and received media attention in light of the February 2019 Warsaw Conference, "This week's global summit in Warsaw will test the main pillar of the Trump administration's policy in the Middle East: The belief that Israel and key Arab states can form an alliance against Iran, even when peace talks between Israel and the Palestinians seem more distant than ever."

The Trump administration tried to launch a "Middle East Strategic Alliance" (also known as the "Arab NATO") including the GCC states, Egypt, Jordan, and possibly Morocco. In April 2019 Egypt announced that it would not participate. In 2020, as part of the Abraham Accords, the United Arab Emirates, Bahrain, Sudan, and Morocco signed diplomatic normalization agreements with Israel. The Marshall Center stated that the Abraham Accords "strengthens the informal anti-Iran alliance in the region". Yoel Gozansky, an Iran expert at the Israeli Institute for National Security Studies, and Clive Jones, a Middle East security specialist wrote: "Our approach lies in understanding Israel's ties with many of the Gulf monarchies, notably Saudi Arabia, the UAE, and Bahrain, not as some formal alliance but rather as a manifestation of a Tacit Security Regime. This regime allows for the evolution of ties between Israel and the Gulf monarchies to be explored and analyzed while allowing us to be mindful that these relations have rarely been linear, let alone underpinned by any shared normative values."

In an anniversary analysis of the Abraham Accords, Haaretz said that the accords were premised on the idea of an "Israel-Sunni" anti-Iran coalition and that normalization would help but that "it's very doubtful there ever was such a coalition, and the accords did nothing to create or solidify one." In March 2022, Saudi Crown Prince Mohammed bin Salman said reconciliation talks with Iran would continue and "We look at Israel as a potential ally but before that it should solve its problems with the Palestinians."

=== Negev Summit (2022) ===
A summit at Sde Boker was hosted by Israeli foreign minister Yair Lapid on 27–28 March 2022. Attending were his American, Bahraini, Egyptian, Emirati and Moroccan counterparts.

US secretary of state Antony Blinken attended the first day and released a joint statement with minister Lapid, saying that "the US believes the JCPOA is the best way to put Iran back in the box." However, "when it comes to the most important element, we see eye-to-eye," Blinken said. "We are both committed, both determined that Iran will never acquire a nuclear weapon." Comparing the Negev Summit to the Camp David Accords which "no one thought possible", Blinken called this the beginning of a "new dawn" for the region.

Foreign minister Nasser Bourita of Morocco relayed a message from King Mohammed VI to Blinken, saying that "when we reestablished the relations [with Israel], this is not an opportunistic move, it is a move of conviction," and promised more formal visits between the two countries’ officials, which will advance cooperation and ties further. Royal Air Morocco had opened direct flights to Tel Aviv earlier in the month.

In response to the ISIL shooting in Hadera that killed two Israelis at a bus stop, all participants condemned it. They decided to make the Negev summit a regular annual conference, and invite other regional partners, including the Palestinians. During the summit, the Bahraini foreign minister openly suggested discussing the establishment of a security-intelligence alliance, which he called a "mini-NATO", among all members of the summit countries.

=== Saudi rapprochement with Iran and Gaza war (2023) ===
On 10 March 2023, Iran and Saudi Arabia announced the resumption of relations, following a deal brokered by China. Under the agreement both countries agreed to respect the other's sovereignty and not interfere in the internal affairs of the other. This triggered a chain reaction in which several Arab nations that had previously established diplomatic ties with Israel began to work towards establishing diplomatic relations with Iran, such as Bahrain and Sudan.

After the Gaza war began in October 2023, Saudi Arabia decided to halt normalization talks with Israel. In January 2024, Prince Khalid bin Bandar Al Saud, the Saudi ambassador to the United Kingdom, said in a BBC interview that Saudi Arabia was still interested in peace and normalized relations with Israel following the war, on the condition of the creation of a Palestinian state.

=== Military reapproachment ===
In June 2024, IDF Chief Herzi Halevi as well as CENTCOM chief and generals from Bahrain, Egypt the UAE, Jordan and Saudi Arabia met in secret in Bahrain in order to discuss regional security cooperation, according to Axios's Israeli journalist Barak Ravid.

== See also ==
- Arab League and the Arab–Israeli conflict
- Qatar diplomatic crisis
- Indo-Abrahamic Alliance
- Axis of Resistance
- Arab–Israeli normalization
