= Jewish cemetery, Meknes =

Burial ground in Morocco

The Jewish Cemetery, Meknes is a Jewish cemetery in Meknes, Morocco. Founded in 1682 to serve the city's Jewish community living in the mellah, or Jewish quarter, it was rehabilitated in 2022.

== History ==
The cemetery was founded in 1682 to serve the Jewish community living in the mellah, or Jewish quarter, of Meknes. The cemetery is 10-acres and estimated to be the location of thousands of bodies. Many of the graves are built atop older ones.

In 2010, King Mohammed VI of Morocco started a renovation program for Jewish heritage sites in his country. In 2022, Moroccan authorities completed a renovation of the cemetery as part of a broader overhaul of over 160 Jewish heritage sites coinciding with the country reestablishing of diplomatic ties with Israel with the Israel–Morocco normalization agreement in light of the Abraham Accords.

On May 19, 2022, dozens of Jews, many of whom were Israelis of Moroccan heritage, made a pilgrimage to the cemetery to visit the graves of prominent rabbis. The visit was conducted under heavy security. However, Jews have visited Meknes for decades.

== Notable burials ==
- Raphael Berdugo, influential 19th century Moroccan rabbi

== See also ==
- Jewish cemetery, Marrakech
- Jewish cemeteries, Essaouira
