= Arab–Israeli normalization =

Peace efforts between Arab states and Israel

Countries that do not recognize Israel are in purple; countries that once recognized it, but have withdrawn recognition, are in pink

Since the 1970s, there has been a parallel effort made to find terms upon which peace can be agreed to in the Arab–Israeli conflict and also specifically the Israeli–Palestinian conflict. Over the years, numerous Arab League countries have signed peace and normalization treaties with Israel, beginning with the Egypt–Israel peace treaty (1979). Despite the failure to implement the Israeli–Lebanese peace accords (1983), more treaties continued with the Israeli–Palestinian peace process (1991–present), the Israel–Jordan peace treaty (1994), the Abraham Accords normalizing relations between Israel–United Arab Emirates and Israel–Bahrain (2020), the Israel–Sudan normalization agreement (2020) and the Israel–Morocco normalization agreement (2020). Moreover, numerous Arab League members established semi-official relations with Israel.

== Israeli normalization with Gulf and North Africa Arab states (2017–2023) ==
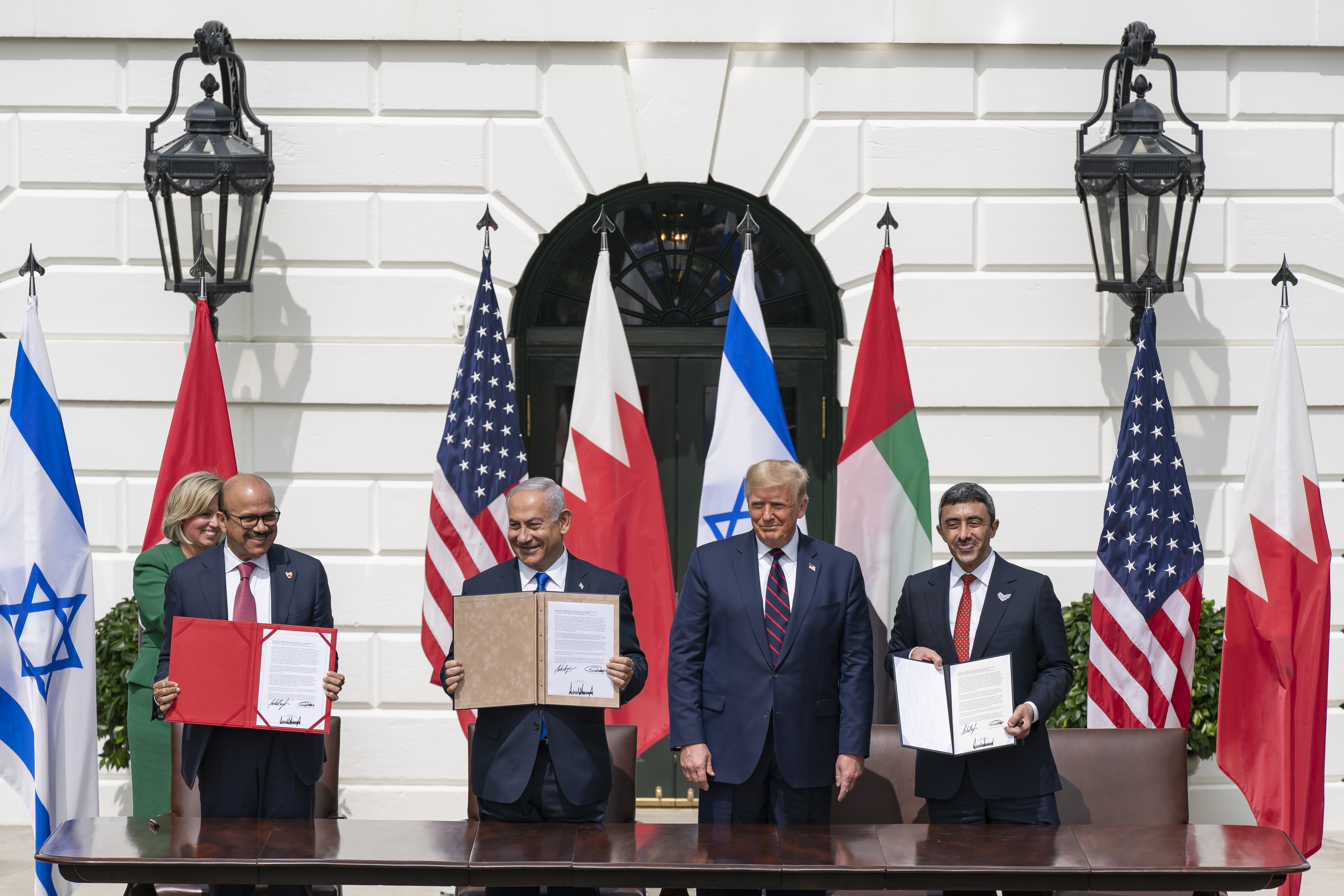
White House Abraham Accords signing ceremony on 15 September 2020

The Arab–Israeli alliance against Iran emerged by November 2017, upon warming ties between Israel and the Gulf States and received broad media attention in light of the February 2019 Warsaw Conference. The coordination is taking place in light of the mutual regional security interests of Israel and Sunni Arab States led by Saudi Arabia, and their standoff against Iranian interests across the Middle East: the Iran–Israel proxy conflict and the Iran–Saudi Arabia proxy conflict. The Arab states participating in the coordination group are the core of the Gulf Cooperation Council. Those include Saudi Arabia, United Arab Emirates and Oman. In 2018, Israeli prime minister Benjamin Netanyahu led a delegation to Oman and met with Sultan Qaboos and other senior Omani officials.

=== 2020 ===
In February 2020, Netanyahu and the chairman of the Sovereignty Council of Sudan, Abdel Fattah al-Burhan, met in Uganda, where they both agreed to normalize the ties between the two countries. Later that month, Israeli planes were allowed to fly over Sudan. This was followed by the Abraham Accords, signed by Israel and the United Arab Emirates in August 2020, which normalized relations between the two countries. Concurrently, Israel agreed to suspend plans for the annexation of the Jordan Valley. This normalization agreement was followed by official confirmation of the one with Sudan, as well as others with Bahrain and Morocco. On 31 May 2022, Israel and the United Arab Emirates signed a free trade agreement, the first of its kind between Israel and an Arab state.

=== 2023 ===
In June 2023, US secretary of state Antony Blinken warned Israel that rising tensions with the Palestinians, including through advancing settlement activity, threatened the expansion of normalization agreements with Arab nations, and particularly Saudi Arabia. Speaking alongside Blinken earlier in June, the Saudi foreign minister had stated that "without finding a pathway to peace for the Palestinian people ... any normalization will have limited benefits". In August 2023, Israeli Foreign Minister Eli Cohen revealed that he had attended a secret meeting in Rome with Libyan Foreign Minister Najla El Mangoush organized by Italian Foreign Minister Antonio Tajani, to discuss normalizing relations between the two countries. The news triggered mass protests in Libya, leading to Mangoush's dismissal.

=== Gaza war (2023–present) ===
The Gaza war has a significant impact on diplomatic efforts. On 14 October 2023, Saudi Arabia suspended talks on the possible normalization of relations with Israel. The Gaza war made talks for normalization unpopular with the Arab youth, forcing Arab governments to scramble to keep back channels with Israel open. On 8 November, Saudi Investment Minister Khalid Al-Falih said that normalization talks were contingent on the Palestinian issue.

In October 2023, during the Gaza war, King Abdullah condemned Israel's blockade of the Gaza Strip and the "collective punishment" of Palestinians in Gaza. On 1 November 2023, Jordan recalled its ambassador to Israel, accusing the country of creating an “unprecedented humanitarian catastrophe” and “killing innocent people in Gaza”. Jordan also declared that Israel's ambassador, who had departed Amman following Hamas' attack, would not be permitted to return.

In August 2025, Israeli Finance Minister Bezalel Smotrich announced plans to build a settlement that would divide the West Bank and disconnect it from East Jerusalem, undermining efforts for the establishment of a Palestinian state. Smotrich also declared that maps were also being drawn up to annex the West Bank. On 3 September 2025, the UAE warned Israel that annexation of the West Bank would constitute a "red line" that would severely undermine the normalization agreement between Israel and the UAE.

== See also ==
- Arab–Israeli relations
- List of Middle East peace proposals
- Gaza war
