= Israel–Sudan normalization agreement =

- Type: Normalization agreement
- Signed: January 6, 2021
- Location: Khartoum, Sudan
- Mediators: United States
- Parties: Israel; Sudan

The Israel–Sudan normalization agreement is an agreement that took place on October 23, 2020, whereby Israel and Sudan agreed that they will normalize relations. It is not clear if the deal establishes full diplomatic relations between the two nations. According to Axios reporting on March 10, 2021, "While Israel has presented Sudan with a draft agreement for establishing diplomatic relations, the Sudanese want an endorsement from the Biden administration." The agreement came after the agreements of Bahrain and the United Arab Emirates signed with Israel in September 2020. Unlike the latter two, Sudan had sent troops to fight against Israel in major Arab-Israeli wars and considered Israel an enemy state.

On April 6, 2021, the Sudanese cabinet approved a bill abolishing the 1958 law on boycotting Israel. The decision came into effect after the Transitional Sovereignty Council approved it in a joint session with the cabinet.

== History ==
Sudan is one of the Arab countries that fought wars with Israel, and its capital, Khartoum, witnessed the adoption of an Arab League resolution known as the resolution of the three noes; No peace, no recognition, no negotiations. Sudan had sent troops to fight the Israeli forces in all Arab-Israeli major wars and considers Israel an enemy state, moreover it was claimed that the Israeli Air Force attacked Sudanese forces and terrorists taking cover in Sudan in 2009 and 2012.

In early January 2016, Sudanese Foreign Minister Ibrahim Ghandour and President Omar al-Bashir floated normalized ties with Israel provided the U.S. government lifted economic sanctions.

In early September 2016, it was revealed that Israel had contacted the U.S. government and other Western countries and encouraged them to take steps to improve relations with Sudan in the wake of the break in relations between the Arab-African country and Iran in the prior year. In February 2020, Israeli Prime Minister Benjamin Netanyahu and the Chairman of the Sovereignty Council of Sudan, Abdel Fattah al-Burhan, met in Uganda, where they agreed to normalize the ties between the two countries. Later that month, Israeli planes were allowed to fly over Sudan. In May 2020, Israel flew medics and equipment to Sudan to try and save a Sudanese diplomat, Najwa Gadah Aldam, who managed to arrange the aforementioned meeting in Uganda as she worked as a political adviser to the president of Uganda Yoweri Museveni, when she was infected and later died from COVID-19.

In August 2020, the US Secretary of State toured several Arab League countries, including Sudan. On September 15, 2020, UAE and Bahrain signed the Abraham Accords with Israel, and thus became the first Arab country to sign a peace deal with Israel since Jordan in 1994. Mauritania recognized Israel in 1999 but cut ties 10 years later. It was reported that Sudan and Oman were also expected to sign the accords after the US elections.

On October 19, 2020, President Trump tweeted that he would remove Sudan from the list of countries it considers state sponsors of terrorism as soon as its government had deposited $335 million in promised compensation for victims of the bombings of the American embassies in Kenya and Tanzania in 1998 and the USS Cole in 2000, and on October 22, Sudan's information minister said Thursday that the money had been deposited. Sudan had hosted Osama bin Laden in Khartoum between 1991 and 1996.

In mid-October 2020, Sudanese businessman Abu Al-Qasim Bortom visited Israel to accelerate the normalization process. On October 22, 2020, an Israeli delegation visited Sudan, where they met with Abdel Fattah al-Burhan for talks on the normalization of ties between the two countries. On October 23, 2020, Israel and Sudan agreed to a deal to normalize ties. President Trump, Sudanese Chairman of the Sovereignty Council Abdel Fattah al-Burhan, Sudanese Prime Minister Abdalla Hamdok, and Israeli Prime Minister Benjamin Netanyahu took part in a conference call on October 23 and subsequently announced the agreement. Sudan's acting foreign minister said on October 23 on state TV that Sudan's agreement will depend on approval from its yet-to-be formed legislative council. The Sudanese government approved the repeal of the 1958 boycott of Israel law on April 6, 2021. The decision received the approval of a joint meeting of Sudan's sovereign council and cabinet on April 20, 2021.

== Agreement ==
A joint statement issued by the governments of Israel, Sudan, and the United States said that "The leaders agreed to the normalisation of relations between Sudan and Israel and to end the state of belligerence between their nations," it went on to state that "In addition, the leaders agreed to begin economic and trade relations, with an initial focus on agriculture." The statement also suggested the possibility of further meetings and agreements, saying that "The leaders also agreed that delegations will meet in the coming weeks to negotiate agreements of cooperation in those areas as well as in agriculture technology, aviation, migration issues and other areas for the benefit of the two peoples."

The Sudanese government emphasized that the agreement needs the approval of an elected parliament to enter into force and that it is only a preliminary agreement.

On January 6, 2021, Sudan officially signed the Abraham Accords Declaration. The signing took place in the Sudanese capital Khartoum, in the presence of US Treasury Secretary Steven Mnuchin. While Sudan signed the declarative section of the agreement, it did not sign the corresponding document with Israel, unlike the United Arab Emirates and Bahrain. As of February 2023, negotiations continue towards normalization. Meanwhile, the ongoing efforts have been condemned by the Sudanese opposition and civil society groups.

== Reactions ==
=== Governments ===
- Bahrain: Bahraini Foreign Ministry described the announcement as "an additional historical step on the path for achieving peace, stability and prosperity in the Middle East region."
- Canada: Foreign Minister François-Philippe Champagne stated on Twitter that "Canada welcomes the normalization between Israel and Sudan. This agreement is a positive step forward that will contribute to enhancing stability, security, and opportunity for all people in this region."
- Germany: German officials welcomed the agreement, saying it represents an "important step towards greater stability and more peaceful relations between Israel and its Arab neighbors."
- Egypt: President Abdel Fattah el-Sisi praised the two countries' agreement to normalize relations. He also welcomed the joint efforts of the United States, Sudan, and Israel to normalize relations.
- Iran: The Foreign Ministry tweeted in English that Sudan had paid ransom to be taken out of the list of state of sponsors of terrorism and labeled the normalization as "phoney."
- State of Palestine: The Palestinian President declared his "condemnation and rejection of the normalization agreement, because that is contrary to the resolutions of the Arab summits, as well as to the Arab Peace Initiative, which was approved by the Arab and Islamic summits, and by the United Nations Security Council in accordance with resolution 1515."
- United Arab Emirates: The Foreign Ministry welcomed the normalization of relations and stated that the decision was "an important step to boost security and prosperity in the region... (and) would expand the scope of economic, commercial, scientific and diplomatic cooperation."
- United Kingdom: Foreign Secretary Dominic Raab welcomed the normalization of relations saying that it is "a positive step between two valued friends. This step is a boost for the democratic transition in Sudan, and peace in the region."
- United States: President Donald Trump tweeted that the normalization was a "huge win for the United States and for peace in the world." He added that "more will follow!"

=== Organizations ===
- European Union: While welcoming the announcement of the agreement the EU recalled "its longstanding position that a comprehensive settlement of the Arab-Israeli conflict requires a regional inclusive approach and engagement with both parties."
- United Nations: Secretary-General Antonio Guterres expressed the hope that the agreement between Israel and Sudan to normalize relations will create opportunities for peace and prosperity.

=== Others ===
- Hamas issued a statement saying: “We express our condemnation and outrage over the despicable and humiliating normalization that does not suit Sudan’s people and history, We call on the heroic people of Sudan to reject the shameful agreement and the establishment of any ties with the criminal enemy.”
- Sudan's Islamic scholars were reported to have issued a Fatwa on October 1, announcing opposition to the central government in Khartoum normalizing ties with Israel, while other Sudanese clerics offered support.
- On October 24, 2020, Sudan's former Prime Minister Sadiq al-Mahdi who heads the country's largest political party, strongly criticized the statement, accusing Trump of being racist against Muslims and Black people and Israel of being an apartheid state.

== See also ==
- Bahrain–Israel normalization agreement – 2020 normalization of diplomatic relations
- Camp David Accords – 1978 political agreement between Egypt and Israel
- Egypt–Israel peace treaty
- Israel–Jordan peace treaty – 1994 agreement between the State of Israel and the Hashemite Kingdom of Jordan
- Israel–Morocco normalization agreement
- Israel–United Arab Emirates normalization agreement
- Kosovo and Serbia economic normalization agreements – Agreement between Kosovo and Serbia to facilitate economic normalization among themselves
