= Israel–United Arab Emirates normalization agreement =

Abraham Accords Peace Agreement: Treaty of Peace, Diplomatic Relations and Full Normalization Between the United Arab Emirates and the State of Israel
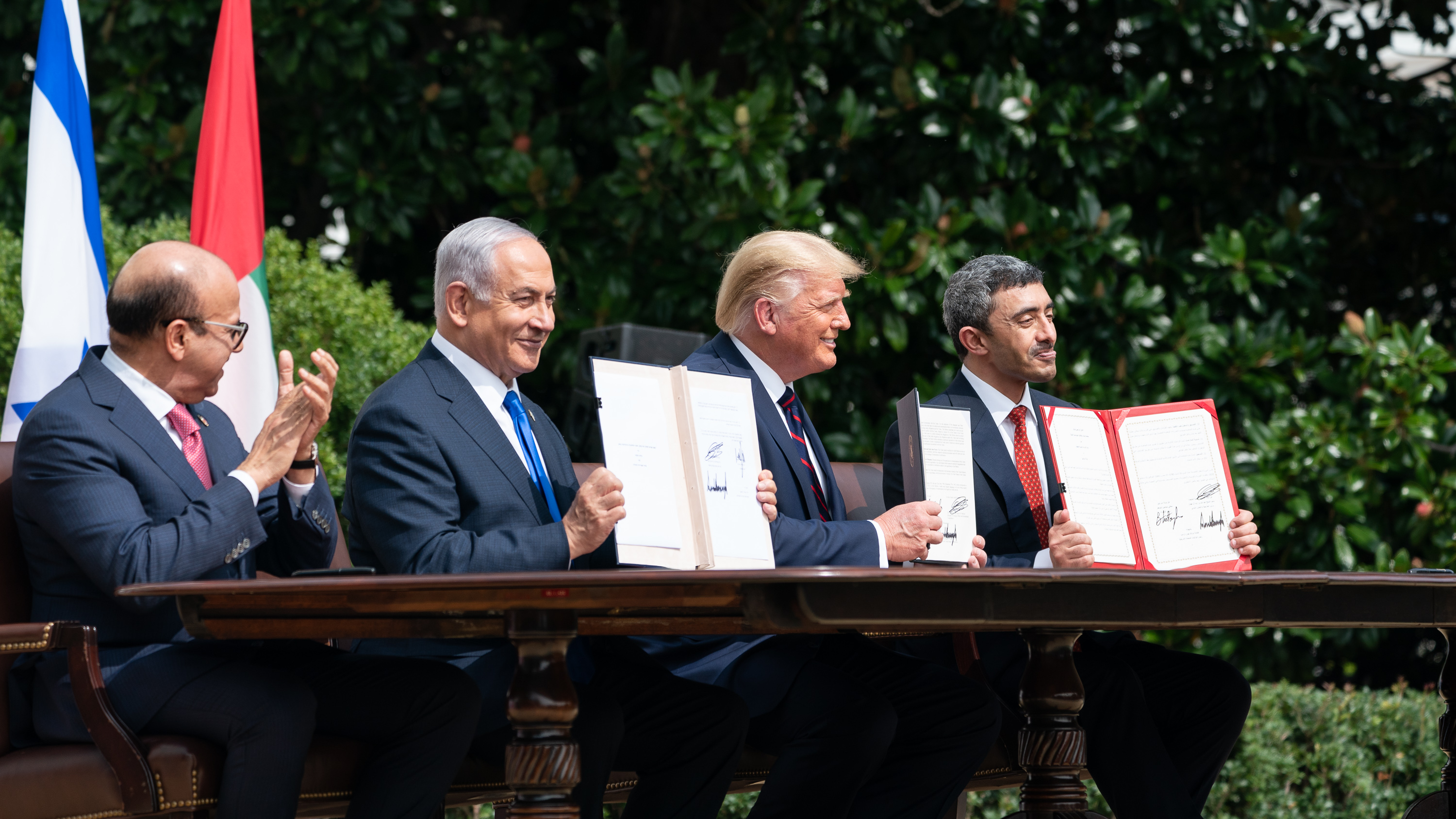
- Signed: September 15, 2020
- Location: The White House, Washington, D.C., US
- Effective: January 5, 2021
- Condition: Effective upon ratification by both parties
- Mediators: United States
- Signatories: Abdullah bin Zayed Al Nahyan; Benjamin Netanyahu; Donald Trump (witness)
- Parties: Israel; United Arab Emirates
- Ratifiers: Israeli cabinet, October 12, 2020; UAE Council of Ministers, October 19, 2020
- Language: English

The Israel–United Arab Emirates normalization agreement, officially the Abraham Accords Peace Agreement: Treaty of Peace, Diplomatic Relations and Full Normalization Between the United Arab Emirates and the State of Israel, was initially agreed to in a joint statement by the United States, Israel and the United Arab Emirates on August 13, 2020, officially referred to as the Abraham Accords. (Note: There is a separate short undated statement headed "The Abraham Accords Declaration": signed by all 4 parties while the agreement between the UAE and Israel contains the following statement "Reaffirming the 'Joint Statement of the United States, the State of Israel, and the United Arab Emirates' (the 'Abraham Accords'), dated 13 August 2020".) The UAE thus became the third Arab country, after Egypt in 1979 and Jordan in 1994, to agree to formally normalize its relationship with Israel, as well as the first Persian Gulf country to do so. Concurrently, Israel agreed to suspend plans for annexing parts of the West Bank. The agreement normalized what had long been informal but robust foreign relations between the two countries. The agreement was signed at the White House on September 15, 2020. It was approved unanimously by the Israeli cabinet on October 12 and was ratified by the Knesset on October 15. The UAE parliament and cabinet ratified the agreement on October 19. The agreement went into effect on January 5, 2021.

On August 16, 2020, the UAE for the first time established telephone links to Israel by unblocking direct dialing to Israel's +972 country code. The first direct commercial flight from Israel to the UAE took place on August 31, 2020, and the first ship carrying cargo from the United Arab Emirates to Israel entered the Port of Haifa on October 12.

== Background ==
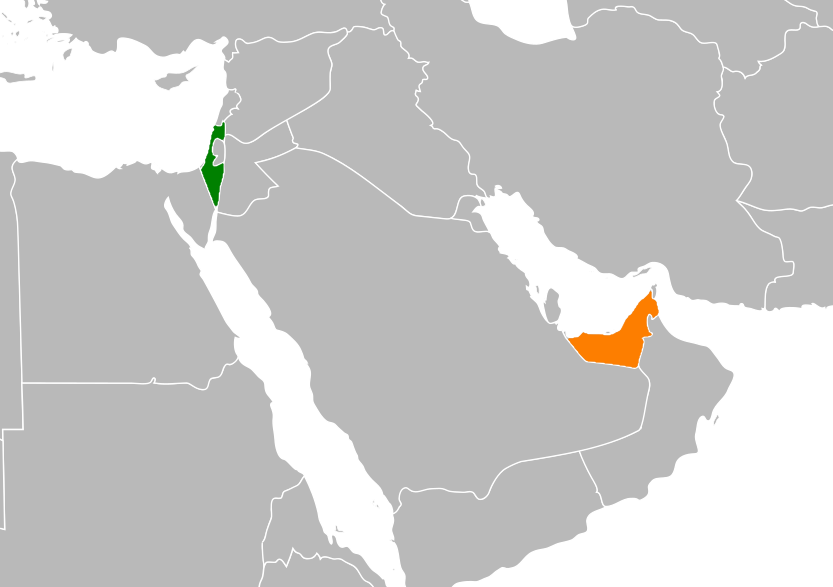
Location of Israel (green) and the UAE (orange) within the Middle East

As early as 1971, the year in which the UAE became an independent country, the first president of the UAE Sheikh Zayed bin Sultan Al Nahyan had referred to Israel as "the enemy". The UAE and the United States had a strategic relationship since the 1990 Gulf War, growing to a significant US Air Force presence at Al Dhafra Air Base after the September 11 attacks. In November 2015, Israel announced that it would open a diplomatic office in the UAE, which would be the first time in more than a decade that Israel had an official presence in the Persian Gulf.

In the months leading up to the agreement, Israel had been working in secret with the UAE to fight the COVID-19 pandemic. European news media reported that Mossad had discreetly obtained health equipment from the Gulf states. Benjamin Netanyahu, the prime minister of Israel, reported at the end of June 2020 that the two countries were in cooperation to fight the coronavirus and that the head of the Mossad, Yossi Cohen, had traveled numerous times to the UAE. However, the UAE appeared to downplay this a few hours later by revealing that it was merely an arrangement among private companies rather than at state level.

The move also comes in the wake of the Trump administration's repudiation of the Iran nuclear deal and following persistent Israeli suspicions that the Iranian nuclear program includes a program to develop atomic bomb capacities, something which Tehran denies. Currently, Iran and Saudi Arabia are engaged in backing different factions in proxy wars from Syria to Yemen, with the UAE supporting the Saudi-led and US-sponsored coalition against the Iran-aligned forces. In recent years, the countries' informal relations warmed considerably and they engaged in extensive unofficial cooperation based on their joint opposition to Iran's nuclear program and regional influence.

The agreement represented a major policy reversal for Netanyahu, who had long pushed for increasing settlements in the occupied West Bank, with an objective of annexing the territory. Netanyahu faced political pressure to demonstrate flexibility, as three recent elections gave him only a plurality in a coalition government and he faced criminal prosecution in 2021. In 2019, the Trump administration reversed decades of American policy by declaring that the West Bank settlements did not violate international law, a decision that threatened the two-state solution that had long been seen as the key to lasting peace between Israel and the Palestinians. The Trump administration's Middle East policy, crafted by presidential senior advisor Jared Kushner and released in January 2020, approved Netanyahu's plan to annex existing settlements. After Yousef Al Otaiba, the UAE ambassador to the United States, wrote a June 2020 opinion piece warning that annexation would threaten better relations between Israel and the Arab world, Kushner saw an opportunity and stepped in to facilitate talks. After negotiators had reached an agreement, President Donald Trump, Netanyahu and Abu Dhabi's Crown Prince Mohammed bin Zayed held a conference call immediately prior to a formal announcement.

== Agreement ==
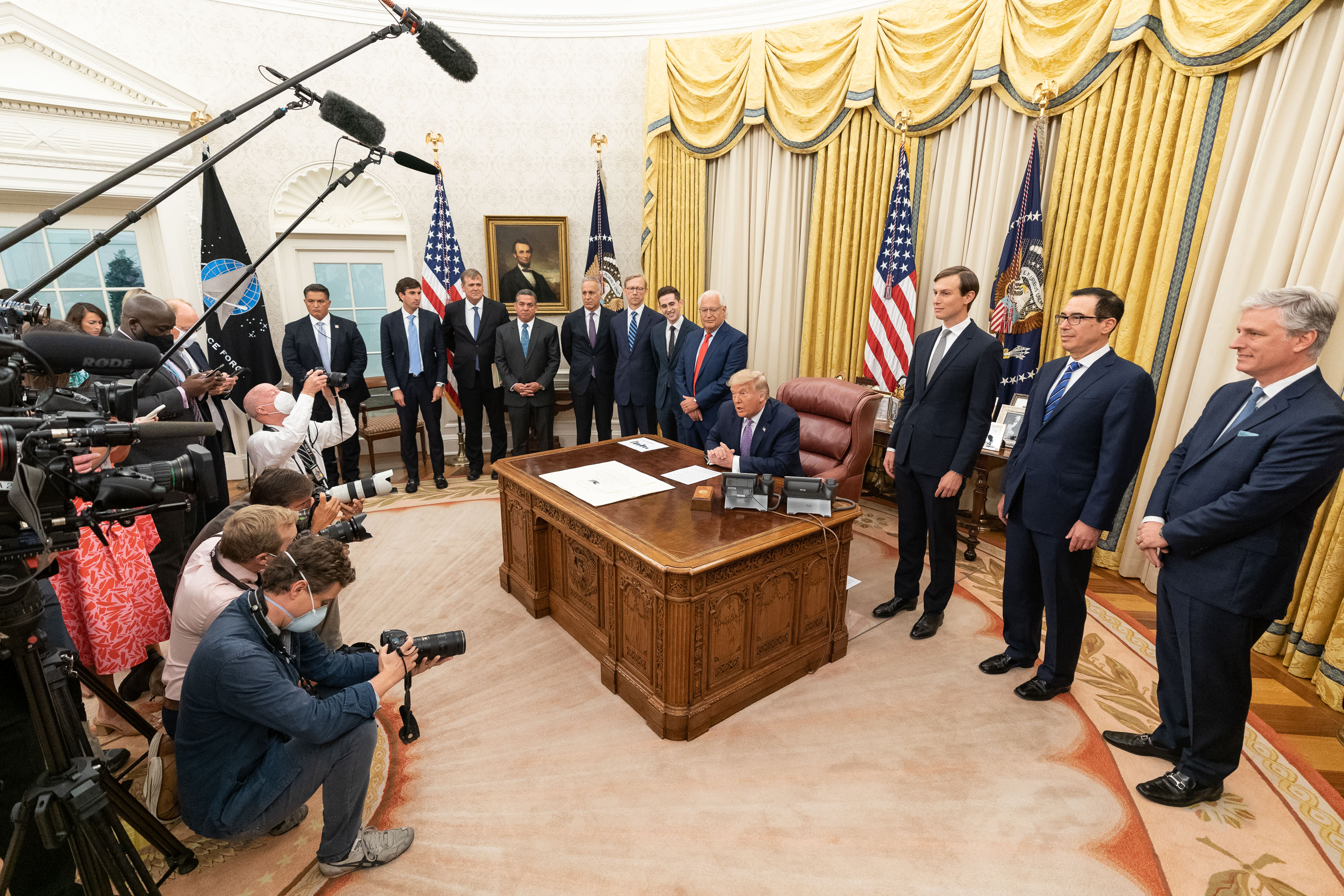
US President Donald Trump announces to the media the agreement from the Oval Office at the White House, August 13, 2020

On August 13, 2020, the UAE Minister of State for Foreign Affairs, Anwar Gargash, announced the UAE's agreement to normalize relations with Israel saying that his country wanted to deal with the threats facing the two-state solution, specifically annexation of the Palestinian territories, and urging the Palestinians and Israelis to return to the negotiating table. He indicated that he did not think that there would be any embassy in Jerusalem until after a final agreement between the Palestinians and the Israelis. According to Trump and Netanyahu, "Israel and the United Arab Emirates will fully normalize their diplomatic relations. They will exchange embassies and ambassadors and begin cooperation across the board and on a broad range of areas including tourism, education, healthcare, trade and security."

A joint statement issued by Trump, Netanyahu, and Zayed, read: "This historic diplomatic breakthrough will advance peace in the Middle East region and is a testament to the bold diplomacy and vision of the three leaders and the courage of the United Arab Emirates and Israel to chart a new path that will unlock the great potential in the region." The UAE said it would continue to support the Palestinian people and that the agreement would maintain the prospect of a two-state solution between Israel and Palestine. Despite the agreement however, Netanyahu stated that Israel's sovereignty claim to the Jordan Valley was still on the agenda and only frozen for the time being.

Zayed tweeted that the "UAE and Israel also agreed to cooperation and setting a roadmap towards establishing a bilateral relationship."

=== Treaty ===
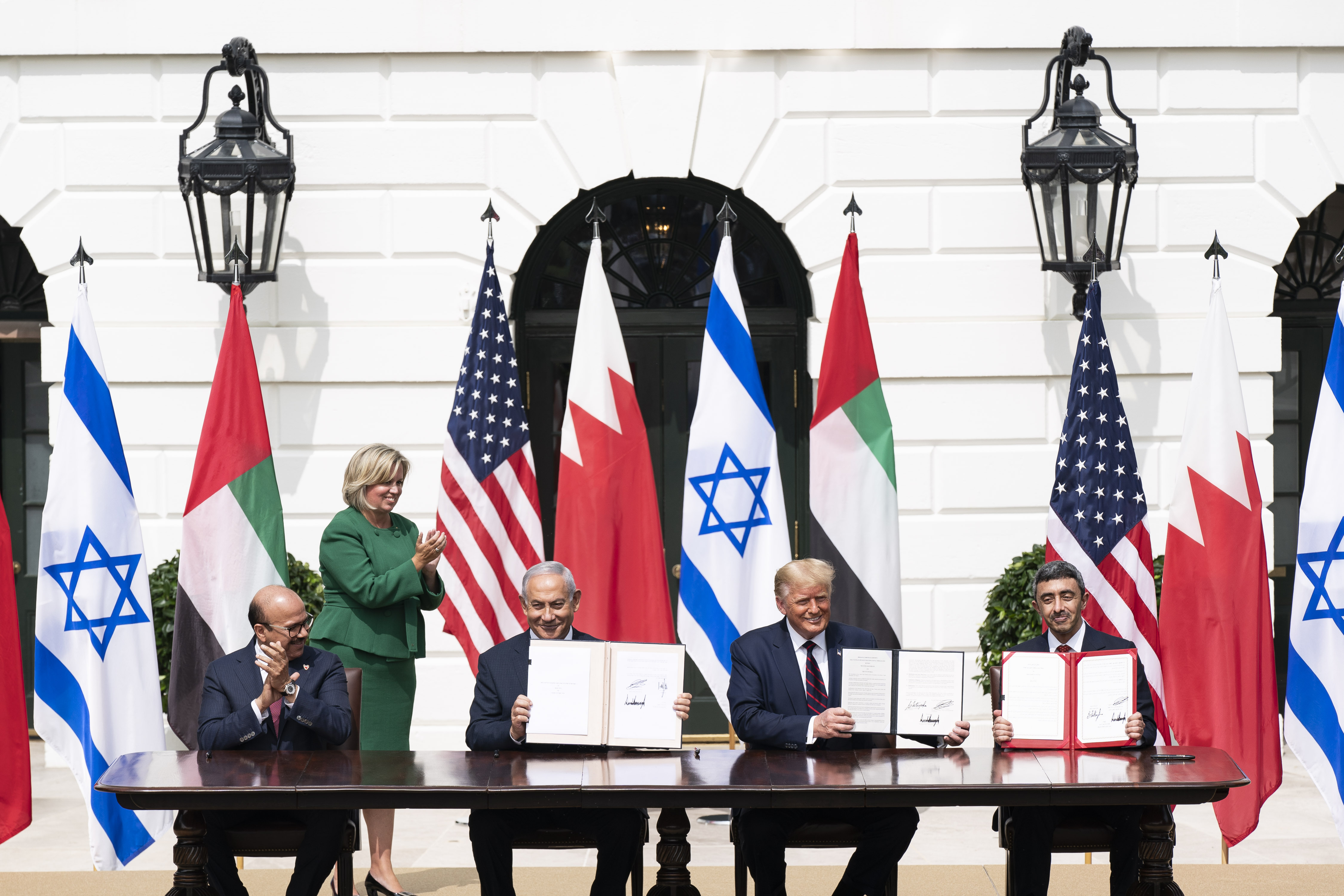
White House Abraham Accords signing ceremony on September 15, 2020

The treaty was signed on September 15, 2020. The treaty recognizes each state's sovereignty, obliges the two states to exchange ambassadors and conclude bilateral agreements on several topics including visa agreements, and will enter into force upon ratification. The agreement was ratified by the Israeli government on October 12 and was ratified by the Knesset on October 15.

== Reactions ==
Israel and the UAE Support Oppose Neutral/Ambiguous No public position

=== Israel ===
Netanyahu said there was "no change" to his plans to annex parts of the West Bank if it was approved by the US, but added they were on temporary hold. Before the agreement, the plan to annex 30% of the West Bank was already on hold due to a majority of Israelis and the government coalition partner Benny Gantz rejecting the plan. Hundreds of thousands of Israeli settlers live in the areas, in addition to Palestinians, which were under Israeli control in practice.

Gantz thanked Trump, Netanyahu and Mohammed bin Zayed Al Nahyan for making the peace deal happen, saying it showed an alliance between Middle Eastern nations that wanted stability and mutual cooperation. It also showed Israel's eternal desire for peace with neighboring countries per him, while also enhancing Israel's image on world stage and creating a better future for the region. Netanyahu when questioned by reporters, admitted to keeping the negotiations with the UAE a secret from Blue and White due to the United States requesting him to do so.

Foreign minister Gabi Ashkenazi said the deal would pave the way for peace agreements with other nations and welcomed the suspension of unilateral annexation. Yesh Atid's chairman Yair Lapid welcomed the agreement as an "important step" for normalization with the UAE and said it showed mutual agreements are the path to be followed for Israel's relations with other nations, instead of unilateral steps like annexation. Israeli Labor Party leader Amir Peretz, too, shared the view and said Israel's development as well as safety lay in such agreements. He hoped for a similar agreement with Palestinians.

Yamina's Naftali Bennett welcomed the deal, but he said that it was "tragic" that the agreement came at the cost of annexation. His fellow MK Bezalel Smotrich dismissed the deal as insignificant and criticized Netanyahu for reviving prospect of a two-state solution. Likud MK and Netanyahu's chief rival in the party, Gideon Sa'ar, welcomed the deal but expressed that he will be more joyous with the annexation. Likud MKs Miri Regev and Yuli Edelstein, meanwhile, opposed the deal because of suspension of annexation.

Tel Aviv-Yafo Municipality Mayor Ron Huldai, congratulated Netanyahu on the "double achievement" of peace with the UAE and shelving of plans to annex parts of the West Bank. Huldai also lit up the Tel Aviv City Hall with the flag of the UAE.

The head of the Israeli settler group Yesha Council, David Elhayani, accused Netanyahu of "betraying" some of his most loyal supporters and having "deceived half a million residents of the area and hundreds of thousands of voters". Oded Revivi, the mayor of Efrat, a settlement of more than 9,000 residents south of Jerusalem, supported Netanyahu, arguing that "the Israeli agreement to postpone the application of Israeli law in the Jewish settlements in Judea and Samaria is a fair price [to pay]", and added it might change how settlements are viewed. Beit El settlement's mayor Shai Alon and Shomron Regional Council chairman Yossi Dagan also criticized the deal.

=== United States ===
Kelly Craft, the US Ambassador to the United Nations, celebrated the announcement, calling it "a huge win" for President Trump and for the world, saying that the diplomatic ties show "just how hungry for peace we all are in this world", and how Middle Eastern countries are all understanding the need "to stand firm against a regime that is the number one state sponsor of terrorism — Iran".

Longtime New York Times columnist Thomas Friedman, who has for decades written about international geopolitics and has been a frequent critic of Trump policies, hailed the agreement as "exactly what Trump said it was in his tweet: a 'HUGE breakthrough.'"

Joe Biden, Trump's opponent in the 2020 US presidential election, praised the agreement as it "builds on the efforts of multiple administrations to foster a broader Arab–Israeli opening, including the efforts of the Obama–Biden administration to build on the Arab Peace Initiative".

Jared Kushner, the primary Trump administration official involved in negotiating the agreement, stated while speaking to CBS News that the deal would make the Middle East more peaceful and hopeful, which would mean fewer American troops would need to be deployed in the region. Secretary of State Mike Pompeo said the deal was an important step toward stabilizing the region and was good for the whole world.

=== Muslim world ===
==== Gulf states ====
The treaty was generally viewed with skepticism by Gulf residents outside the UAE, according to the International Business Times. Emiratis who criticized the deal online were less numerous than those who supported it due to a crackdown against dissent, with many of those opposing the deal living outside the UAE. An open online signature campaign against the deal set up by the non-governmental organization UAE Anti-Normalisation Association had received 1.7 million signatures as of September 17.

Yousef Al Otaiba, the Emirati ambassador to the United States, issued a statement on August 13 extolling the agreement as "a win for diplomacy and for the region", adding how it "lowers tensions and creates new energy for positive change".

Kuwait's long-standing position on the issue became prominent after the announcement. A joint statement was issued the day of the announcement by seven movements in the Assembly comprising Liberals, Shi'ites, Islamists, and Arabists, among other blocs who condemned the treaty. 41 MPs (out of 50) signed a letter opposing normalization the day parliament was reconvened, and a stand was organised in front of the Palestinian embassy in Kuwait City. Several NGOs also issued similar statements.

Jared Kushner, Senior Advisor to the President of the United States, condemned Kuwait's position. However, his condemnation was widely shared online as a positive, according to Al Jazeera. The government of Kuwait itself however remained silent on the deal. 37 Kuwaiti MPs called upon it on August 18 to condemn the agreement. Kuwaiti newspaper Al-Qabas had reported two days earlier that the Kuwaiti government's position was unchanged regarding Israel, citing anonymous government sources.

In Bahrain, which was the first Gulf Arab country to comment publicly in support of the deal as a step toward peace, fear of government crackdown prevented activists from voicing their criticism. On August 26, King of Bahrain Hamad bin Isa Al Khalifa explained to visiting US Secretary of State Mike Pompeo that the Gulf state is committed to the creation of a Palestinian state, implicitly rejecting the normalization of ties with Israel. The country however later agreed to normalization of ties with Israel, which was announced by US President Donald Trump on September 12.

The government of Oman publicly supported the agreement (which it termed "historic"). The Grand Mufti of Oman, Ahmed bin Hamad al-Khalili, indirectly criticized the treaty. Iraqi government spokesman Ahmed Mulla Talal said Iraq will not interfere in sovereign matters of other countries, but its laws did not allow normalization of relations with Israel.

Despite the lack of official response at first, the hashtag "Normalisation Is Treason" started trending after the announcement, particularly among young Saudi activists. On August 19, Saudi Arabia's Foreign Minister Faisal bin Farhan Al Saud said the deal could be seen as positive, but his country will not normalize relations until peace is signed with the Palestinians, hopefully within the framework of the Arab Peace Initiative.

On August 21, in an apparent response to Trump, who on August 19 said he expected Saudi Arabia to join the accord, Prince Turki bin Faisal Al Saud wrote that the price for normalizing relations with Israel is the creation of a sovereign Palestinian state with Jerusalem as its capital. He added that any Arab country that wants to follow the UAE's footsteps should demand a higher price for peace from Israel in future.

Along with the Arab nations, the Emiratis also started to get frustrated with the Abraham Accords, as the war in Gaza was intensifying. The UAE remained the only diplomatic lifeline for Israel, which in turn brought favourable public relations with West and billions in funds for the UAE. The Dubai Deputy Police Chief, Dhahi Khalfan said Israel’s “intentions are evil” and that Arab leaders should “reconsider the issue of dealing with Israel”.

==== Palestine ====
Palestine Liberation Organization (PLO) official Hanan Ashrawi lambasted the agreement, writing on Twitter that "Israel got rewarded for not declaring openly what it's been doing to Palestine illegally and persistently since the beginning of the occupation." Fatah accused the UAE of "flouting its national, religious and humanitarian duties" toward the Palestinian people, while Hamas said it was a "treacherous stab in the back of the Palestinian people" and claimed the agreement was a "free reward" for Israeli "crimes and violations against the Palestinian people".

Nabil Abu Rudeineh, senior advisor to President Mahmoud Abbas, read an official statement in which the Palestinian leadership rejected the agreement, terming it a betrayal against Jerusalem, Al-Aqsa and the Palestinians. The Palestinian National Authority (PNA) recalled its ambassador from Abu Dhabi. Palestinian leaders also stated that Hamas leader Ismail Haniyeh called Abbas and rejected the deal, something which Reuters called a "rare show of unity".

Other leaders and factions including the Islamic Jihad Movement in Palestine unanimously rejected the agreement according to Al Jazeera. Palestinian National Initiative's leader Mustafa Barghouti said they were not surprised because of the UAE's recent moves and the fact that the Emiratis never tried to fight Israel. He added that this might encourage other nations to ignore the Palestinian issue. Palestinian Liberation Front leader Wasel Abu Yousef said that the agreement only gave Israel more leverage for its occupation. PNA's minister of social affairs Ahmed Majdalani said they did not know about the deal in advance and the UAE was deceiving others, while unilaterally changing the Arab world's approach to the Israeli–Palestinian conflict.

Ordinary Palestinians took to social media to protest the deal and some also insulted the UAE. Meanwhile, Fatah Central Committee member Abbas Zaki called the agreement a breach of Arab consensus on how to deal with the Israeli–Palestinian conflict. He accused the UAE of betraying the Arabs and the Palestinians, before urging the PNA to withdraw its ambassador from the UAE and also asked the Arab League to cancel the 2002 Arab Peace Initiative.

Late Palestinian leader Yasser Arafat's widow Suha Arafat however apologised to the UAE on Instagram for reactions of Palestinians to the deal, stating that she regretted that the flag of the United Arab Emirates was harmed by protestors in the West Bank and photos of the UAE's Mohammed bin Zayed Al Nahyan were burnt, adding that those were not the values of Palestinian people. She asked the younger generation of Palestine to read about how the UAE had supported them in the past. The apology was praised by the Emirati media, however met with criticism from Palestinian officials.

==== Iran ====
Iran's Tasnim News Agency said the Israel–UAE deal was "shameful". The Iranian Foreign Ministry condemned the deal as a "dangerous" stab in the back of Palestinians and Muslims, terming it a "shameful" act of "strategic stupidity" by the UAE and Israel that would only serve to strengthen the "Axis of Resistance" in the Middle East. It added that the Palestinians and people of the world would never forgive the UAE, while also warning it against Israel interfering in the Gulf.

The Islamic Revolutionary Guard Corps warned the UAE that it will face dangerous repercussions for the deal. Iran's President Hassan Rouhani termed the agreement a "huge mistake" and warned the UAE against permitting Israel to have a secure presence in the Gulf. Foreign minister Mohammad Javad Zarif called it a betrayal against Arab and non-Arab countries in the Middle East. A group of protesters numbering fewer than 100 gathered in front of the embassy of the UAE in Tehran on August 15, chanting "Death to America" and "Death to Israel". The protesters also burnt the flag of Israel. The conservative newspaper Kayhan, whose editor-in-chief is appointed by the Supreme Leader of Iran, warned that the agreement had turned the UAE into a "legitimate, easy target".

The UAE's Foreign Ministry summoned Iran's chargé d'affaires on August 16 and criticized Rouhani's speech as "unacceptable and inflammatory" which could impact the security scenario of the Gulf. It also stated that protecting the Emirati embassy in Tehran was Iran's duty. Gulf Cooperation Council's secretary-general Nayef bin Falah Al-Hajraf also condemned Iran's threats and told it to not interfere in affairs of other countries, adding that the GCC stood by the UAE against any threats to the country.

The Chief of Staff of the Iranian armed forces Mohammad Bagheri meanwhile said that their strategy toward the UAE would now shift and the UAE would be held responsible in case of an attack on Iran through the Persian Gulf. Foreign Minister Zarif said on August 24 that the UAE could not buy security from Israel, which itself was not safe. He added that cooperation between countries in the Persian Gulf was the only way to security. Iranian government spokesman Ali Rabiei warned the UAE on August 26 that it will be held responsible for any threat to their country by Israel and stated that it should keep a watch on anti-Iranian activities by Israel inside it.

The Supreme Leader Ayatollah Ali Khamenei on September 1 accused the UAE with betraying the Islamic world, the Arab countries and Palestine. Khamenei stated that the normalization will be only temporary, but the UAE will forever have to bear the shame regarding the deal. He accused it of working against the interests of the Muslim world along with Israel and Kushner, hoping the country will soon repent for what it did.

==== Turkey ====
The Turkish Foreign Ministry condemned the agreement, saying history and the people of the Middle East would neither forgive nor forget what the UAE did, and that it was a violation of the 2002 Arab Peace Initiative. It called the UAE's behavior hypocritical and added that the Palestinians were correct in rejecting the agreement. President Recep Tayyip Erdoğan later stated that Turkey was considering suspending or cutting off diplomatic relations with the UAE in retaliation, as well as recalling its ambassador from Abu Dhabi.

Presidential spokesperson İbrahim Kalın also expressed concerns regarding the deal to the US National Security Advisor Robert C. O'Brien. The Speaker of the Grand National Assembly Mustafa Şentop condemned the deal, calling it "disgraceful" and a betrayal of the Palestinian cause.

==== Pakistan ====
Rallies and demonstrations were held in many cities across Pakistan to condemn the agreement between the UAE and Israel.

The Ministry of Foreign Affairs cautiously reacted and in a press statement termed the Israel–UAE deal is having "far-reaching implications, and that Pakistan's approach will be guided by our evaluation of how Palestinians' rights and aspirations are upheld and how regional peace, security and stability are preserved".

The News International reported that Pakistan will give stance on the Israel–UAE agreement after consultations and after examining pros and cons of the development on Pakistan's national interests. Foreign Minister Shah Mahmood Qureshi avoided making comments on the sensitive subject.

Prime Minister Imran Khan said on August 18 that Pakistan will never recognize Israel until a Palestinian state is created no matter what another country does, a statement in line with the vision of Pakistan's founder Muhammad Ali Jinnah. He added that one needs to think of the injustices suffered by Palestinians before trying to normalize relations with Israel.

==== Others ====
Egyptian President Abdel Fattah el-Sisi welcomed the deal, saying that he praises the parties' efforts to "achieve prosperity and stabilization in our region". He also personally congratulated Emirate of Abu Dhabi's crown prince Mohammed bin Zayed Al Nahyan for the deal.

Jordan's Foreign Minister Ayman Safadi said the agreement should be followed up by Israel abandoning any plan to annex parts of the West Bank and if the deal could lead to its withdrawal from Palestinian territories, it would move the Middle East closer to peace. Otherwise, it would only exacerbate the Arab–Israeli conflict.

Malaysia said the deal was a sovereign right of the UAE, but it will continue to support Israel's withdrawal from the Palestinian territories.

Mauritania, a member of the Arab League, said in a statement that it trusts the "wisdom and good judgment" of the United Arab Emirates leadership and highlighted the "absolute sovereignty and complete independence in conducting its relations and assessing the positions it takes in accordance with its national interest and the interests of Arabs and Muslims".

Hezbollah's leader Hassan Nasrallah called the deal a betrayal against Islam, Arabism, Jerusalem and the Palestinians. He accused the UAE of doing a favor for Trump in view of the upcoming presidential election in the United States. Lebanese President Michel Aoun, whose Free Patriotic Movement party is an ally of Hezbollah, in contrast said Lebanon would be open to peace with Israel if their mutual problems were resolved and the UAE had the right to normalize its relations with Israel since it was a sovereign nation.

In Yemen, Mohammed Ali al-Houthi, leader of the Houthi movement's Supreme Revolutionary Committee, criticized the deal as treason against the Palestinians and the cause of pan-Arabism. Yemen's Foreign Minister Mohammad al-Hadhrami opposed the deal, saying the country will continue supporting the Palestinians and their rights. Presidential advisor Abdulmalik Al-Mekhlafi criticized the deal, claiming it was opposed by all Arab nations and was against Arabism. Houthi spokesman Mohammed Abdelsalam said the deal was a provocation against Arab and Islamic nations, and it also showed that countries like the UAE involved in the Yemeni Civil War were trying to fulfil Israel's agenda.

The Government of National Accord of Libya condemned the deal as an "unsurprising betrayal from the UAE". The spokesman for Sudan's Ministry of Foreign Affairs Haidar Sadig was fired for making comments off his own accord wherein he called the deal a "brave and bold step", while claiming there were secret contacts between Sudan and Israel. Sudanese Prime Minister Abdalla Hamdok told Pompeo on August 25 that his transitional government had "no mandate" to establish relations with Israel and such a thing could only be decided after election of a democratic government.

Bouthaina Shaaban, political and media advisor to the Syrian President, criticized the deal in her comments that appeared in Al-Watan newspaper, saying secret relations between the UAE and Israel existed for decades but now they revealed it publicly. She stated that there was nothing new in the deal and regretted that the Gulf nations were hostile to Iran, but want peace with Israel that detests the history of Arabs and forcibly takes Palestinian land.

The Assembly of the Representatives of the People of Tunisia criticized the agreement and stated it stood in solidarity with the Palestinian cause. Protests were held by scores of people outside the embassy of the UAE in Tunis, with people burning Israeli flags and photos of President of the United Arab Emirates Khalifa bin Zayed Al Nahyan while supporting the Palestinian cause for independence. President of Tunisia Kais Saied later said that Tunisia would not interfere in the deal nor oppose it, but it stood with the Palestinians.

Prime Minister of Morocco Saadeddine Othmani said that the country rejected any normalization of relations with Israel, which would only embolden it to increase its repression of Palestinians. Hundreds of people held protests against both the UAE and Bahrain's peace deal with Israel on September 20 and burned an Israeli flag. The protesters called the two countries "treacherous" while also criticizing the United States and "Zionist allies". They also called for any normalization with Israel to be criminalized. However, in December 2020, Morocco and Israel agreed to normalize relations.

In Somaliland, Bashe Awil Omar, envoy to Kenya, welcomed the normalization between the two countries. Stating that it "emphasizes eternal aspiration of reaching peace with neighbors" and it being a key example of how bilateral cooperation is paramount to regional stability.

=== Europe ===
==== United Kingdom ====
British Prime Minister Boris Johnson lauded the agreement as a pathway to achieving peace in the Middle East and also praised suspension of annexation of areas in the West Bank. British Foreign Secretary Dominic Raab voiced similar sentiments, adding that it was time for direct dialogue between Israelis and Palestinians, while the latter stated that it created an opportunity for resuming the talks. The Shadow Foreign Secretary Lisa Nandy called it an important first step and said that the Labour Party hoped that it would lead towards permanent suspension of annexation plans, which can lead towards peace between Israelis and Palestinians.

==== European Union ====
A European Commission spokeswoman said the deal was an important for both Israel and the UAE, in addition to ensuring their stability. Italy meanwhile hoped that it would usher in peace and stability in the Middle East. It also called Israel's suspension of annexation of parts of the West Bank positive and hoped it will restart talks with Palestinians for a two-state solution. Spain expressed similar sentiments and said it welcomed the deal. German Foreign Minister Heiko Maas called up Israeli foreign minister Gabi Ashkenazi to congratulate him. French Foreign Affairs Minister Jean-Yves Le Drian welcomed the deal and suspension of annexation. France and Germany saw the agreement as keeping hopes up for a two-state solution.

Belgium's foreign minister Philippe Goffin said he welcomed the deal as a step toward a peaceful Middle East and added that the suspension of annexation plans must be followed up with the two-state solution. High Representative of the Union for Foreign Affairs and Security Policy Josep Borrell hailed the deal as benefiting both nations and being important for stability in the Middle East. He also called suspension of annexation plans positive and stated that the European Union hoped for a two-state solution. Norwegian Minister of Foreign Affairs Ine Marie Eriksen Søreide hailed the deal as a positive development and said Norway welcomed any move that led toward peace in the Middle East.

Greece's Ministry of Foreign Affairs congratulated both nations and called it a victory for diplomacy, hoping it brought peace to the region. Ukraine's President Volodymyr Zelenskyy congratulated Netanyahu during a call. Other nations including Austria, Hungary, the Czech Republic, Romania and Kosovo hailed the deal too. Bulgarian Ministry of Foreign Affairs called it an "exceptional diplomatic breakthrough" which could change the Middle East's future, hoping it will bring peace and improve lives of people of the Middle East, and congratulated both countries. Polish Foreign Minister Jacek Czaputowicz discussed the deal with the UAE's foreign minister Abdullah bin Zayed Al Nahyan in a phone call and congratulated him for it, saying cooperation was necessary for resolving the Middle East's problems. He also welcomed the suspension of Israeli annexation plans and hoped Israeli–Palestinian dialogue would resume.

==== Russia ====
The Russian Foreign Ministry issued a statement in which it stressed that as a member of the United Nations Security Council and the Quartet on the Middle East, it supported the two-state solution to the Israeli–Palestinian conflict. It noted that the agreement suspended annexation of parts of the West Bank, which it termed as an important element of the deal, stating annexation plans were a major hindrance to resuming Israeli–Palestinian dialogue. Russian President Vladimir Putin in a phone call with Netanyahu on August 24, said he hoped that the accord would increase the stability and security of the Middle East.

==== Luxembourg ====
Luxembourg's Foreign Minister Jean Asselborn in contrast doubted that the agreement would bring stability to the region, stating there will be no stability without a two-state solution, and said the UAE had let the Palestinians down with the agreement. The Ministry of Foreign Affairs later issued a statement from him in which he stated that he was not being critical of the peace deal, but highlighting that it was important for Arab, especially Gulf states, to support a Palestinian statehood in line with the two-state solution.

=== Others ===
South Africa's Department of International Relations and Cooperation expressed regret that the agreement was struck without any consultation with Palestinians, even though the deal was related to their future, and noted the agreement does not guarantee a permanent suspension of annexation of parts of the West Bank.

India welcomed the agreement saying that both nations are its allies and it has always supported peace and prosperity in Western Asia. Minister of External Affairs Subrahmanyam Jaishankar earlier stated that the UAE's foreign minister Abdullah bin Zayed Al Nahyan had called him to discuss the agreement.

China stated that it was pleased with attempts to decrease hostilities in the Middle East through the deal and hoped it would restart the Israeli–Palestinian dialogue, adding that it will continue to support the Palestinian people. South Korea welcomed the deal, adding it hoped it contributed to peace and stability in the region.

The Philippines' Department of Foreign Affairs released a statement welcoming the agreement, hoping that it will contribute to peace and security in the Middle East.

Costa Rica said it was a historic step which help in peace and resolving the problems of the region. Foreign Minister Rodolfo Solano Quirós said it received the news with joy as both nations were its allies and looked to continue working with them in the future. Japan's Foreign Ministry welcomed the deal and added it was the first step toward bringing peace as well as stability. Brazil expressed similar sentiments.

Canada's Foreign Minister François-Philippe Champagne welcomed the deal as a positive and historic step towards a peaceful and secure Middle East, adding Canada was gladdened by suspension of annexation plans. Australian Foreign Minister Marise Payne called the accord as well as suspension of annexation important and welcomed it.

=== United Nations ===
UN Secretary-General António Guterres welcomed "any initiative that can promote peace and security in the Middle East region". Stéphane Dujarric, Guterres' spokesman, praised the deal, stating that it suspended "Israeli annexation plans over parts of the occupied West Bank" which Guterres had repeatedly called for, and stated that "peace in the Middle East is more important than ever".

UN Special Coordinator for the Middle East Peace Process Nickolay Mladenov welcomed the deal too, adding that it would stop Israel's annexation plans which the UN has repeatedly called for to be stopped and hoped it will restart dialogue between Israel and Palestinians.

== Aftermath ==
On August 16, 2020, Israel and the UAE inaugurated direct telephone services. The Emirati company APEX National Investment and Israel's Tera Group signed an agreement to partner in research on COVID-19, making it the first business deal signed between companies of the two nations since normalization of ties. The director of the Mossad Yossi Cohen arrived in the UAE on August 18 to discuss security cooperation, regional developments as well as issues that concerned both countries with the National Security Advisor Tahnoun bin Zayed Al Nahyan. This marked the first visit of an Israeli official since the announcement of the deal. The UAE formally ended its boycott of Israel on August 29.

On August 17, Israeli Prime Minister Netanyahu said that Israel was working to start direct flights to the UAE using Saudi Arabia's airspace. Netanyahu's office and other officials later denied reports of approving the United States' sales of F-35 warplanes to the UAE following the deal. Emirati foreign minister Anwar Gargash said in an interview with the Atlantic Council that the peace deal should remove any obstructions in acquiring the jets, though any sale would take years to negotiate and deliver and the UAE had not made a new request for them after the deal.

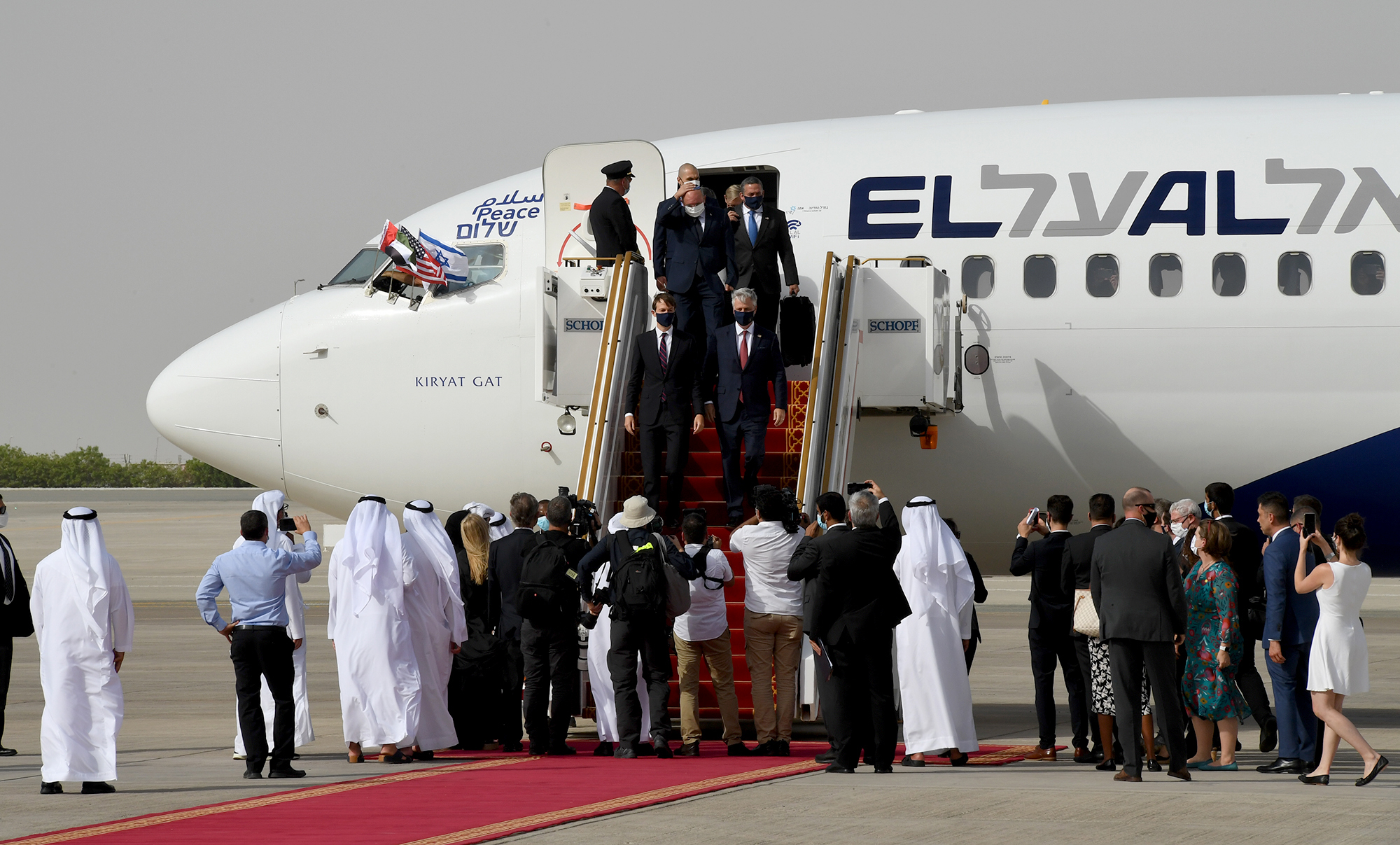
Robert O'Brien, Jared Kushner and delegation of Israeli officials headed by Meir Ben-Shabbat in Abu Dhabi on August 31, 2020

An El Al spokesman announced on August 28 that the company will operate El Al 971, the first ever commercial flight between Israel and the UAE, flying from Tel Aviv's Ben Gurion Airport towards Abu Dhabi. Saudi Arabia allowed use of its airspace for the airplane to fly directly towards the UAE and it landed at Abu Dhabi International Airport. The flight carried a delegation of American and Israeli officials which included Jared Kushner, Robert C. O'Brien and Israeli national security advisor Meir Ben-Shabbat. The airplane had the word "peace" painted in Hebrew, Arabic and English languages painted above its cockpit window and received a red carpet welcome. Both Saudi Arabia and Bahrain later permanently opened their airspace for flights between Israel and the UAE.

On September 3, El Al announced that it would operate weekly indirect cargo flights to the UAE through the Belgian city of Liège, with the first one scheduled for September 16, carrying agricultural and high-tech equipment. On September 10, Israir became the first airline company to announce a direct flight route between Israel and the UAE. The company stated that the flights will travel between the Ben Gurion Airport and the Abu Dhabi International Airport, taking three-and-a-half hours to reach their destination. The first cargo ship from the UAE entered Israel at the Port of Haifa on October 12, with the ship MCS Paris scheduled to arrive at the port on a weekly basis.

Habtoor Hospitality became the first Emirati hotel group to start serving kosher food as part of its menu, partnering with Elli's Kosher Kitchen for its making. Abu Dhabi Department of Culture & Tourism issued a note to Abu Dhabi hotels, recommending they serve kosher food in menus as well as outlets. The Orthodox Union was selected to certify kosher food. The Emirati airlines Emirates' catering service Emirates Flight Catering announced on September 17, that it will establish a facility to produce kosher food called "Kosher Arabia" in partnership with CCL Holdings. The UAE's first kosher-certified restaurant called "Armani/Kaf" opened in Armani Hotel Dubai on September 17, located in Burj Khalifa.

On September 9, the Arab League refused to condemn the UAE's decision to normalize with Israel after several countries objected to the submitted Palestinian draft resolution. Nevertheless, secretary-general Ahmed Aboul Gheit said, "The goal all our Arab countries seek, without exception, is to end the occupation and establish an independent Palestinian state on the 1967 borders with East Jerusalem as its capital." Gheit confirmed rejection of any accords presented on an international stage, which negatively impacted Palestinian rights or the status of Jerusalem.

On September 22, United States Secretary of Defense Mark Esper assured Israeli defense minister Benny Gantz during his visit to Washington that Israel's military edge will be protected, a sentiment earlier echoed by Senate Majority Leader Mitch McConnell and Speaker of the United States House of Representatives Nancy Pelosi, who, following President Donald Trump saying that he personally had no problem with selling F-35s to the UAE, warned that any such decision would be scrutinized by the United States Congress.

While the two countries had long-maintained de facto recognition in areas of business including the diamond trade and high tech industries including artificial intelligence and defence, the accord opened the door to a much wider range of economic cooperation, including formal investments. Abu Dhabi Investment Office opened its first overseas branch in Israel. And on October 13, Dubai-based NY Koen Group has announced its intention to purchase Israir.

Since the signing of the Abraham Accords, the United Arab Emirates has welcomed 200,000 Jewish tourists, and the Jewish population is estimated to have risen to 10,000. The wedding of Rabbi Levi Duchman and Lea Hadad, held on the second anniversary of the signing, was the largest Jewish event in the country's history, hosting 1,500 guests, including high-ranking Emirati officials and foreign ambassadors from over 20 countries.

== Analysis ==
According to Hannu Juusola at the University of Helsinki, the agreement meant that Palestinians would think that the UAE put its own interests before those of the Palestinians, who had always assumed that Arab countries would not sign peace treaties with Israel before the rights of Palestinians had been guaranteed.

Lisa Goldman, co-founder of +972 Magazine, stated that Netanyahu "never intended to annex" parts of the West Bank, but the UAE is "claiming a diplomatic victory in exchange for what's probably a lot of very valuable security cooperation from Israel. All on the backs of Palestinians, as usual."

Amira Hass wrote that the agreement is the product of ongoing neglect by the Palestinian National Authority of relations with the UAE. According to Hass, diplomatic relations were severed by the PLO in 2012, in repudiation of the UAE's good relations with Mohammed Dahlan, the political enemy of the PLO's chairman, Mahmoud Abbas. The PNA's animosity toward the UAE continued to June 2020, when the PLO rejected aid sent by the UAE during the COVID-19 pandemic, on the grounds that it was sent without prior agreement and through an Israeli airport. Hass depicts a PLO more concerned with internal politics than with governance, contributing to an economic decline and strained foreign relations.

On August 16, 2020, the Financial Times editorial board wrote that the accord, rather than delivering peace, is likely to exacerbate Palestinians' sense of hopelessness and produce more problems in the future as the Israeli and US governments have "shown no interest in a fair resolution of the Palestinian–Israeli conflict".

The New York Times regarded the accord as a timely foreign policy breakthrough for President Donald Trump in the context of the November 2020 presidential election, where opinion polling had him trailing his presidential challenger Joe Biden amidst pronounced social unrest in the United States and an economic downturn resulting from the COVID-19 pandemic.

Deutsche Welle's journalist Kersten Knipp stated that the Palestinians were looking for new allies post the deals of the UAE and Bahrain with Israel, however allying with Iran and Turkey could upset the European Union member states. As such, they were eyeing Russia and Qatar to give support for their cause. Both the countries have some level of contact with Israel.

The Times of Israel's Middle East analyst Avi Issacharoff called it an earthquake for Palestinians, and stated that while the Palestinians are not going anywhere, the PNA might be.

Amos Yadlin and Assaf Orion wrote that the Emirates chose normalization in an effort to improve relations with the United States and pro-Western countries, given the recent deterioration in ties between the UAE and Iran, as well as the country's close ties to China and Russia.

== See also ==
- Bahrain–Israel normalization agreement
- Camp David Accords
- Egypt–Israel peace treaty
- Israel–Jordan peace treaty
- Israel–Morocco normalization agreement
- Israel–Sudan normalization agreement
- Kosovo and Serbia economic normalization agreements
