= Israel–Morocco normalization agreement =

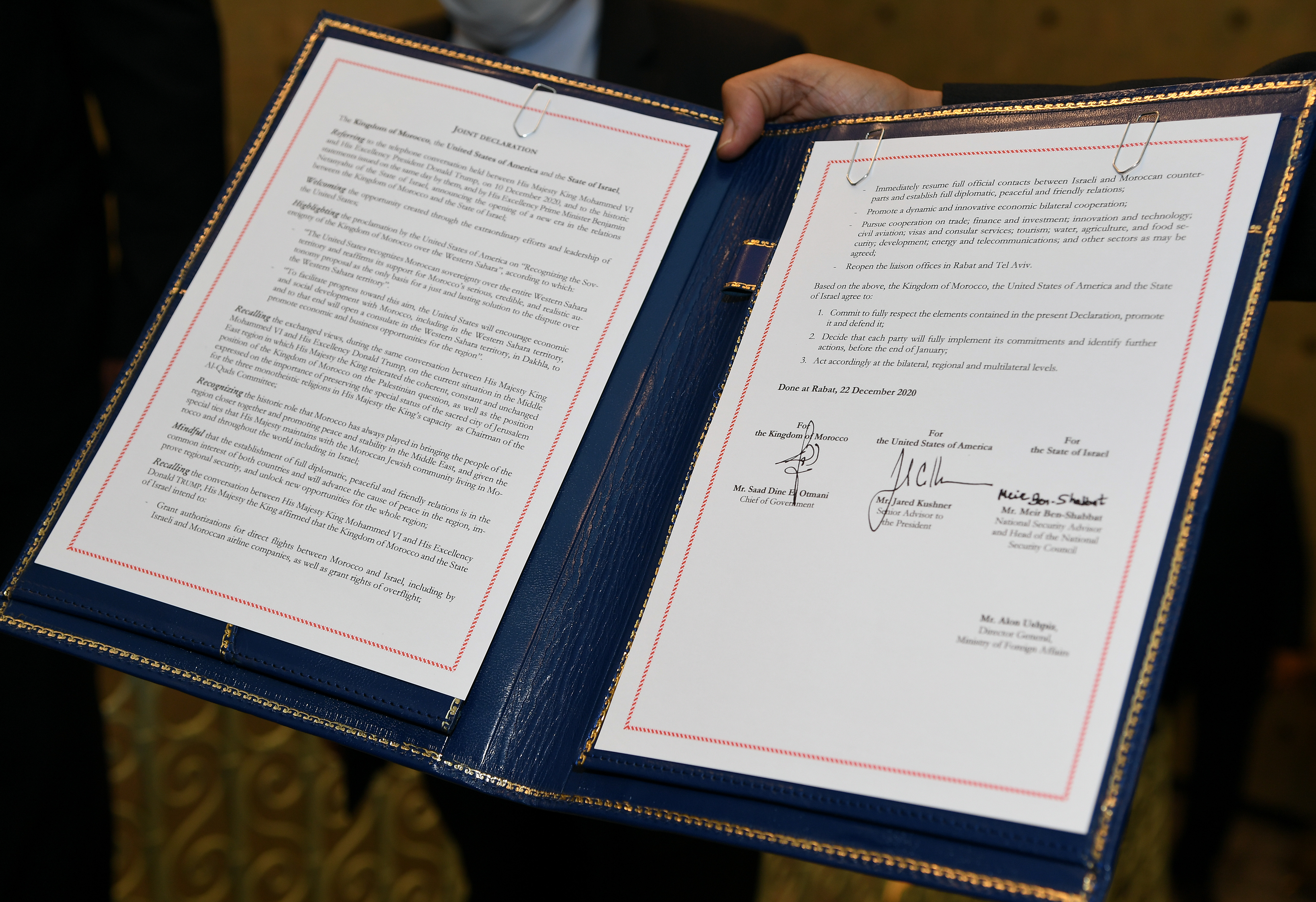
- Tripartite declaration signed on December 22, 2020
- Type: Normalization agreement
- Signed: December 22, 2020
- Location: Rabat, Morocco
- Mediators: United States
- Parties: Israel; Morocco

The Israel–Morocco normalization agreement is an agreement announced by the United States government on December 10, 2020, in which Israel and Morocco agreed to begin normalizing relations. On December 22, 2020, a joint declaration was signed pledging to begin direct flights, promote economic cooperation, reopen liaison offices and establish full diplomatic relations between the two countries.

The agreement followed Bahrain, the United Arab Emirates, and Sudan also signing normalization agreements with Israel in September and October 2020. Along with Egypt and Jordan, Morocco became the sixth Arab League country to normalize ties with Israel. As part of the agreement, the United States agreed to recognize Morocco's annexation of Western Sahara while urging the parties to "negotiate a mutually acceptable solution" using Morocco's autonomy plan as the only framework.

== Background ==
Moroccan walled in the territory of Western Sahara, during the Western Sahara war (1975–1991). In yellow, the territory under control by the Polisario Front

=== Israel–Morocco relations ===
According to Elie Podeh, the Mossad established an office in Morocco in 1963. Podeh writes too that "the two countries enjoyed political relations over the years—King Hassan frequently met with political figures from Israel, usually in secret, especially with Shimon Peres."

During the 1973 Yom Kippur War, Moroccan soldiers, roughly 700 of whom were killed, fought Israeli forces in southern Syria as part of the Syrian Army's northern flank.

The two countries established low-level diplomatic relations during the 1990s, following Israel's interim peace accords with the Palestinians, which were suspended after the start of the Al-Aqsa Intifada in 2000. The two countries have maintained informal ties since then, with an estimated 50,000 Israelis traveling to Morocco each year, although by 2020 the Jewish population in Morocco had decreased to approximately 2,000.

The agreement was negotiated by a team led by Jared Kushner, a Senior Advisor to the President of the United States, and Avi Berkowitz, a Special Representative for International Negotiations. Kushner and Berkowitz had been speaking with the Moroccan government for over two years, suggesting normalization of relations with Israel in exchange for US recognition of Morocco's claim to Western Sahara. When Kushner visited Morocco in May 2019, King Mohammed VI raised the issue of US recognition of Western Sahara, emphasizing the importance of this issue to Morocco. A main push factor for the deal and Israel's other normalization agreements in 2020 was that it facilitated a united front against Iran to reduce its influence in the region. Morocco has viewed Iran as a threat, and cut ties with the Iranian government in 2018, accusing it of funding the Western Saharan separatist movement Polisario Front via Hezbollah.

=== Abraham Accords ===
The agreement followed Bahrain, the United Arab Emirates, and Sudan also signing normalization agreements with Israel in September and October 2020. Along with Egypt and Jordan, Morocco became the sixth Arab League country to normalize ties with Israel.

Driss Maghraoui notes that Dennis Ross—a key negotiator in the Oslo Accords in Bill Clinton's administration—said: "I set up a number of discreet meetings between Israeli officials and their Gulf state counterparts in the 1990s" and "most of the bilateral meetings involved security cooperation and built on intelligence contacts that Mossad has established over time, but the scope of these private discussions were clearly expanded".

=== History of the Jews in Morocco ===
According to Driss Maghraoui, "One of the important strategies of normalization with Israel has been the instrumentalization of Jewish history and memory in the context of Moroccan history and cultural heritage."

Prior to Israel's establishment in 1948, Morocco had a large Jewish population of about 250,000 Jews (10% of the population), and hundreds of thousands of Israeli Jews have lineage that traces to Morocco.

== Agreement ==
Morocco (in dark green), Western Sahara (in light green) and Israel (within the orange circle)

Under the agreement, initially announced by the White House on December 10, 2020, Morocco will move toward "full diplomatic, peaceful and friendly relations" and trade relations and resume official contacts with Israel, and direct flights will be made between the two countries. Morocco officially recognized Israel in its communication to Israeli Prime Minister Benjamin Netanyahu. According to Kushner, the two countries planned to "reopen their liaison offices in Rabat and Tel Aviv immediately with the intention to open embassies." Minister Delegate Mohcine Jazouli of the Moroccan Ministry of Foreign Affairs, African Cooperation and Moroccan Expatriates said "Judaism is embedded in Moroccan culture," and that Jewish history would "appear in school textbooks and would soon be taught." Serge Berdugo, secretary-general of the Council of Jewish Communities of Morocco, said that the decision to teach Jewish history and culture in Moroccan schools "has the impact of a tsunami; [it] is a first in the Arab world."

On December 22, 2020, Kushner and Israel's National Security Advisor Meir Ben-Shabbat, whose family immigrated to Israel from Morocco, were among the high-level officials who boarded a flight from Israel to Rabat, Morocco, to sign a joint declaration pledging to start direct flights between the two countries, promote economic cooperation, reopen liaison offices, and move toward full diplomatic relations. The United States also agreed to recognize Morocco's claim to the disputed Western Sahara territory while urging the parties to negotiate "using Morocco's autonomy plan as the only framework to negotiate a mutually acceptable solution." Trump added that his country "recognizes Moroccan sovereignty over the entire Western Sahara territory and reaffirms its support for Morocco's serious, credible and realistic autonomy proposal as the only basis for a just and lasting solution to the dispute over the Western Sahara territory." Kushner called on both sides to work with the United Nations in implementing a proposal to give the people of the territory broad autonomy. The US also said it intended to open a consulate in Dakhla in the Western Sahara.

== Reactions ==
=== Israel and Morocco ===
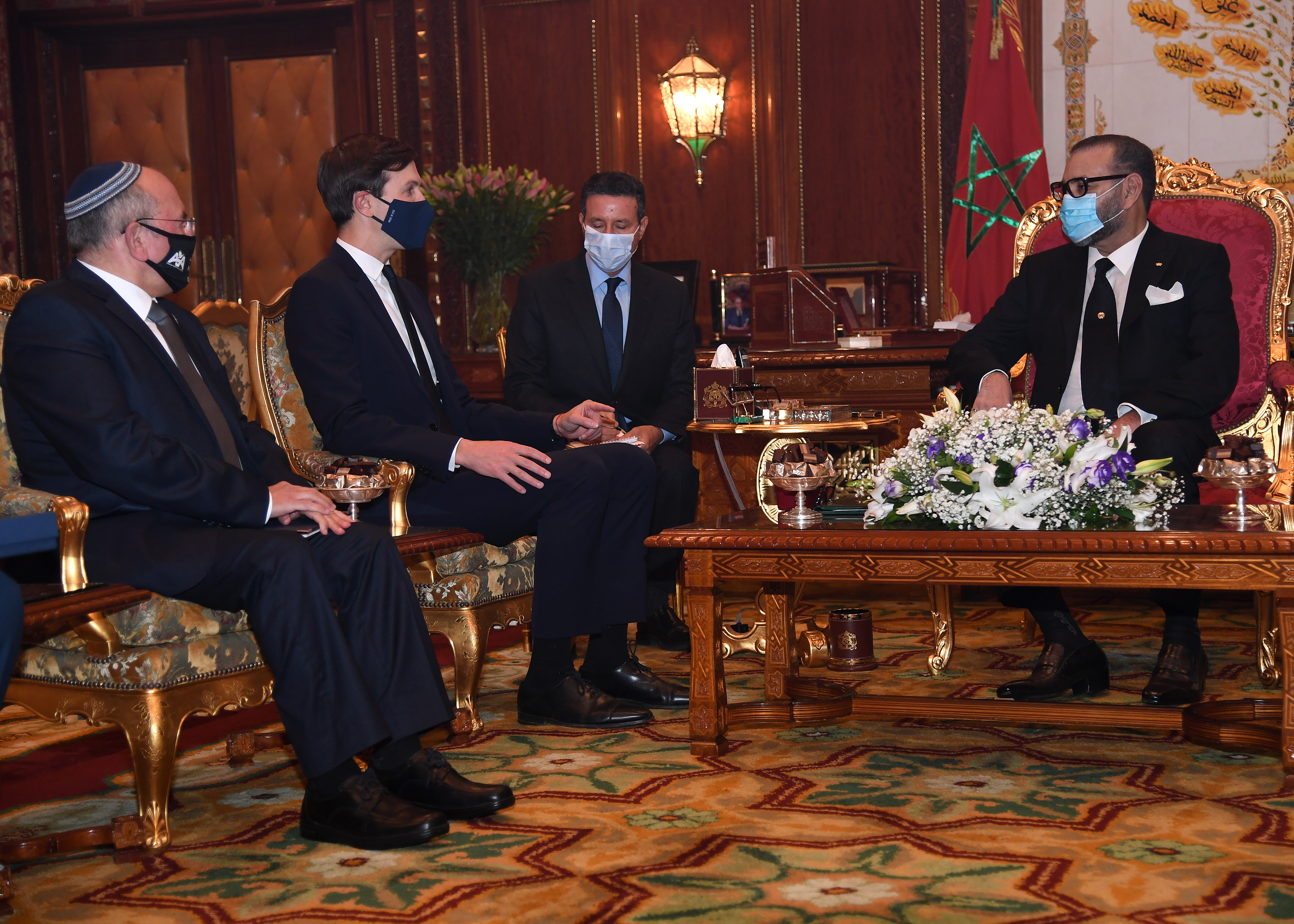
Joint U.S.-Israeli delegation meets with King Mohammed VI of Morocco on December 22, 2020

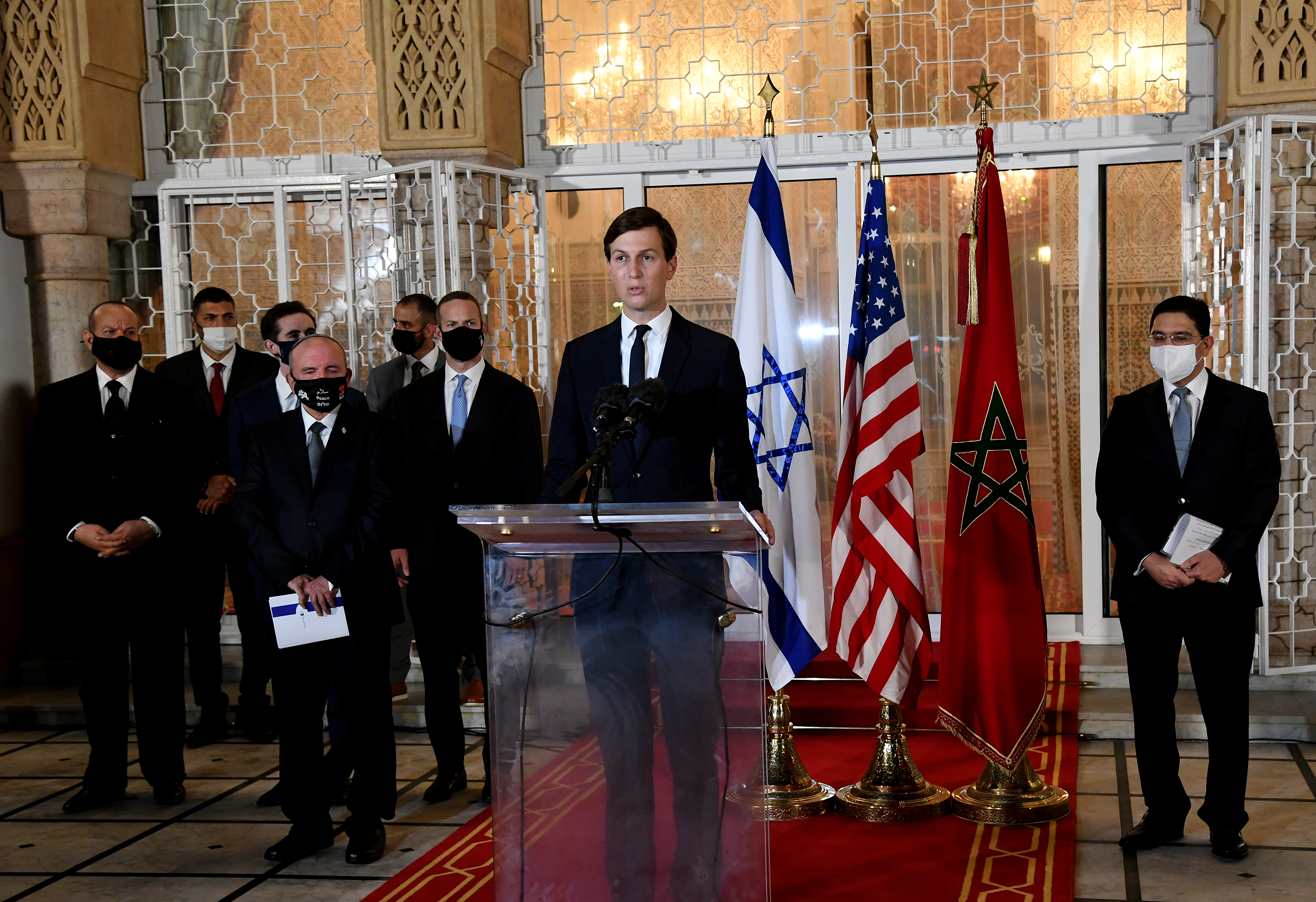
President Donald Trump's son-in-law and senior advisor Jared Kushner and Israel's National Security Advisor Meir Ben-Shabbat leading a joint U.S.-Israeli delegation to Morocco

In an address on the occasion of Hanukkah, Israeli Prime Minister Benjamin Netanyahu hailed the decision, and spoke of the "tremendous friendship shown by the kings of Morocco and the people of Morocco to the Jewish community there".

Following the announcement, the Moroccan royal cabinet issued a press release regarding a phone call between King Mohammed VI and Palestinian leader Mahmoud Abbas, and the Moroccan government reaffirmed that its stance on the Palestine issue remained unchanged. According to analyst Omar Brouksy, the agreement had been decided without prior consultation with Parliament or with Prime Minister Saadeddine Othmani, who had previously expressed his opposition to normalization. Amongst the political parties in Morocco, only the left-wing Unified Socialist Party and Democratic Way issued statements criticizing the normalization agreement, alongside the religious and youth branches of the moderate Islamist Justice and Development Party in government.

Members of the Moroccan Jewish community welcomed the announcement. A group of activists planning to hold an anti-normalization protest were dispersed by Moroccan police; a move described by Abdessamad Fathi, president of the Al Adl Wa Al Ihssane-affiliated Moroccan Instance for the Support of Ummah Affairs, as evidencing that the deal was "imposed on Moroccans". By contrast, rallies in support of US recognition of Morocco's claim to Western Sahara were allowed to take place without interference.

=== United States ===
US Senator Ted Cruz, a member of the Senate Foreign Relations Committee, expressed support for the agreement, saying that "if the United States is unequivocal and clear that we stand with our Israeli allies and against our mutual enemies, our regional allies will come together to the benefit of our own national security and the safety of the American people." Former Senator Norm Coleman, a member of the Republican Jewish Coalition, called the agreement "historic" and an "important step towards greater stability and peace in the region."

US Senator Jim Inhofe, chairman of the Senate Armed Services Committee and an advocate for the independence of Western Sahara, sharply criticized the Trump administration for recognizing Morocco's claim to Western Sahara. Inhofe described the decision as "shocking and deeply disappointing," adding that he was "saddened that the rights of the Western Saharan people have been traded away." Former National Security Advisor John Bolton also criticized Trump for recognizing Morocco's claim, writing on Twitter that "Trump was wrong to abandon thirty years of US policy on Western Sahara just to score a fast foreign policy victory." In October 2021, a draft bill of the United States Senate Committee on Appropriations for the allocation of 2022's budget said that "none of the funds […] may be used to support the construction or operation in the Western Sahara of a United States consulate." In December 2020, Mike Pompeo, Trump's Secretary of State, had announced the start of the process to establish one.

=== United Nations ===
United Nations Secretary-General António Guterres welcomed the agreement, but reserved judgment on Western Sahara, according to a spokesman. The UN said that its position on Western Sahara was "unchanged" following the announcement, with a spokesperson of Guterres suggesting that "the solution to the question can still be found based on Security Council resolutions." On December 21, 2020, following a closed door session of the security council, the South African ambassador said "We believe that any recognition of Western Sahara as part of Morocco is tantamount to recognizing illegality as such recognition is incompatible with international law."

=== Arab world ===
Egyptian President Abdel Fattah el-Sisi welcomed the announcement, saying that the deal would promote "further stability and cooperation" in the Middle East. Abu Dhabi's crown prince Sheikh Mohammed bin Zayed Al Nahyan wrote on Twitter: "This ... contributes to strengthening our common quest for stability, prosperity, and just and lasting peace in the region." Bahrain and Oman praised the agreement. Tunisian Prime Minister Hichem Mechichi said: "We respect Morocco's choice." Saudi Arabia's King Salman said "We support the efforts of the current US administration to achieve peace in the Middle East."

Algerian Prime Minister Abdelaziz Djerad expressed his country's dissatisfaction with Morocco's normalization of its relations with Israel, remarking there is "a desire to bring the Israeli and Zionist entity to our borders." For its part, the Movement of Society for Peace (HAMS), the largest Islamic party in Algeria, considered the normalization of Morocco's relations with Israel as a "sinister decision", and a "threat to the Maghreb countries to introduce them into the cycle of unrest that was far from them, and to bring to the enemy's intrigue on our borders". Regarding United States recognition of Moroccan sovereignty over Western Sahara, Algeria said it "has no legal effect because it contradicts U.N. resolutions, especially U.N. Security Council resolutions on Western Sahara".

Palestinian leadership and government media were silent on the agreement, which was criticized by Hamas and the Palestinian Islamic Jihad, both of which are designated as terror organizations by the United States. A press statement from the Polisario Front, a Sahrawi nationalist movement, condemned Trump's recognition of Morocco's claim to Western Sahara.

=== Others ===
Iran condemned Morocco's normalization of relations with Israel. A senior Iranian official said the normalization was a "betrayal and a stab in the back of Palestinians".

Spanish foreign affairs minister Arancha González Laya said that the country welcomed the normalization of relations, but rejected the US's recognition of Morocco's claim to Western Sahara. Russia welcomed the restoration of diplomatic ties between the countries but condemned Trump's decision to recognize Morocco's sovereignty over Western Sahara, saying it breaches international law.

== Aftermath ==
In the aftermath of the normalization agreement, Moroccan authorities overhauled over 160 Jewish heritage sites in the country, including the Jewish cemetery in Meknes.

== See also ==
- Abraham Accords
- Camp David Accords
- Israel–Morocco relations
- Beit Yehuda Synagogue
