= Bahrain–Israel normalization agreement =

2020 normalization of diplomatic relations

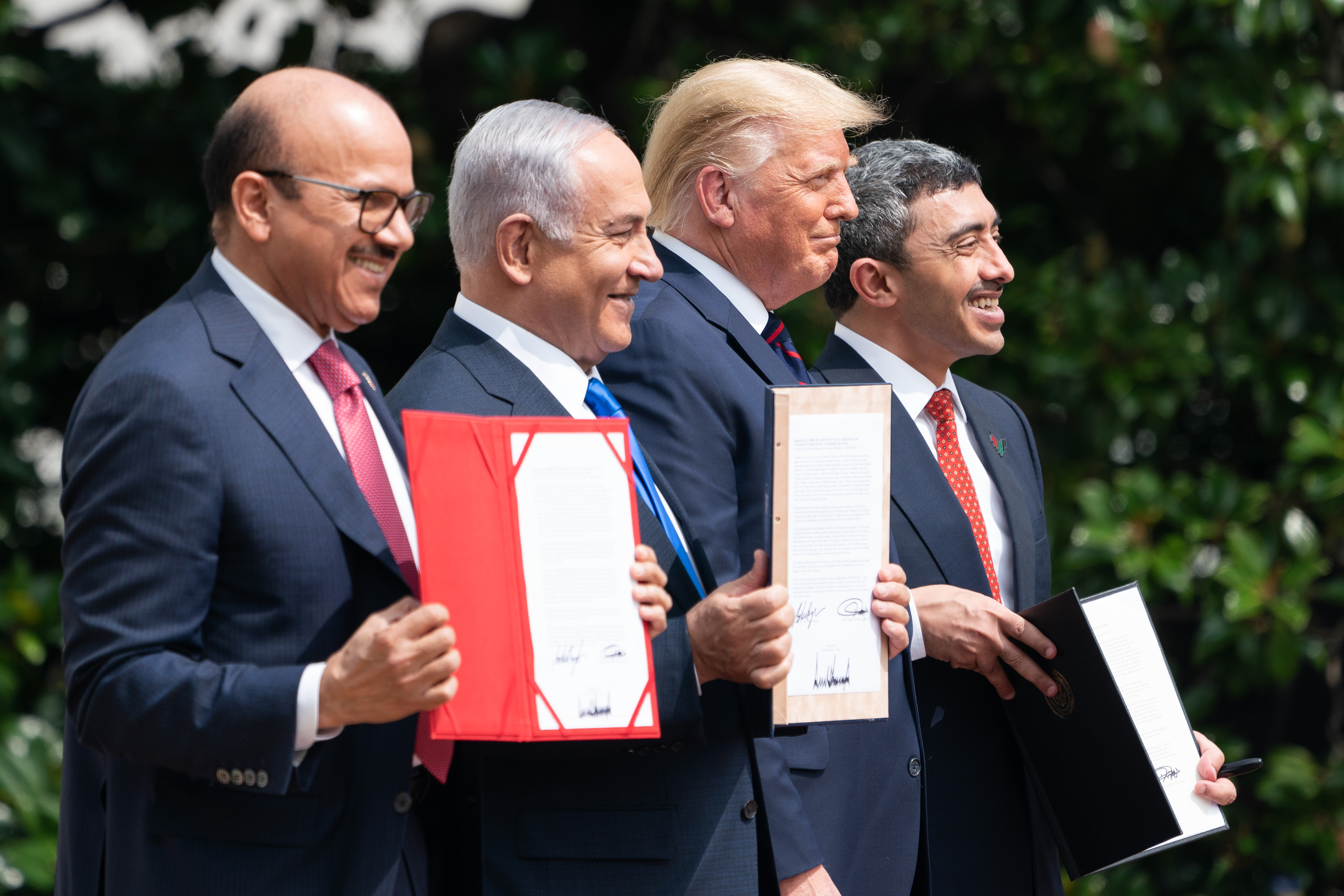
- Type: Normalization agreement
- Signed: September 15, 2020
- Location: White House
- Mediators: United States
- Signatories: Abdullatif bin Rashid Al Zayani; Benjamin Netanyahu; Donald Trump (witness)
- Parties: Bahrain; Israel
- Languages: English

The Bahrain–Israel normalization agreement, officially Abraham Accords: Declaration of Peace, Cooperation, and Constructive Diplomatic and Friendly Relations, is an agreement to normalize diplomatic and other relations between Bahrain and Israel. The agreement was announced by President Donald Trump on September 11, 2020, and followed on from a joint statement, officially referred to as the Abraham Accords, by the United States, Israel and the United Arab Emirates (UAE) on August 13, 2020. It was formally signed on September 15, 2020, at the White House in Washington, D.C., and made Bahrain the fourth Arab state to recognize Israel and the second within a month. (Note: There is a separate short undated statement headed "The Abraham Accords Declaration:" signed by four parties including Bahrain while a contemporaneous agreement between the UAE and Israel contains the following statement " "Reaffirming the joint statement of the United States, the State of Israel and the United Arab Emirates" (the "Abraham Accords") dated 13 August 2020;")

== Background ==
In 2005, Bahrain abandoned its boycott of Israel, in exchange for a free trade agreement with the United States.

On May 20–21, 2017, in the Saudi capital of Riyadh, a summit of 55 Muslim countries and the U.S. discussed ways of rooting out global terrorism. King Salman of Saudi Arabia and the leaders of the Sunni countries, including Bahrain, discussed Iran's growing influence and activities in the Middle East. Israel was not invited to the summit.

In September 2017, the King of Bahrain, Hamad bin Isa Al Khalifa, denounced the Arab League boycott of Israel, saying that the kingdom's citizens were entitled to visit Israel, even though the two countries had no diplomatic relations, in a speech to Rabbi Marvin Hier, the president of the Simon Wiesenthal Center in Los Angeles.

On May 8, 2018, Saudi Arabia, the United Arab Emirates and Bahrain publicly welcomed and supported the U.S. withdrawal from the Iranian nuclear deal, citing Iran's destabilizing activities in the Middle East. Israel also supported the U.S. withdrawal. Pressure from Iran's growing influence and involvement in the region has led to Bahrain's support for the Israeli stance against Iran and brought the countries closer. During the May 2018 Israel–Iran incident in Syria, Bahrain's Foreign Minister expressed support for Israel's "right to defend itself".

On February 13–14, 2019, both Bahrain and Israel participated in a security conference in Warsaw, Poland, where Iran's growing influence was discussed. Subsequently, relationships between Israel and the Gulf countries grew stronger. On June 25–26, 2019, Bahrain hosted the "Peace to Prosperity" workshop in Manama, where the Trump administration presented the economic part of the Trump peace plan. The Palestinian Authority rejected the plan and boycotted the workshop while Israel was not invited, although Israeli journalists were allowed to cover the proceedings. In July 2019, Foreign Minister of Bahrain, Khalid bin Ahmed Al Khalifa, and his Israeli counterpart, Israel Katz, met in the United States. In October 2019, an Israeli official, Dana Benvenisti-Gabay, attended the "Working Group on Maritime and Aviation Security" in Manama, Bahrain. In December 2019, Jerusalem chief rabbi, Shlomo Amar, visited Bahrain for an interfaith event.

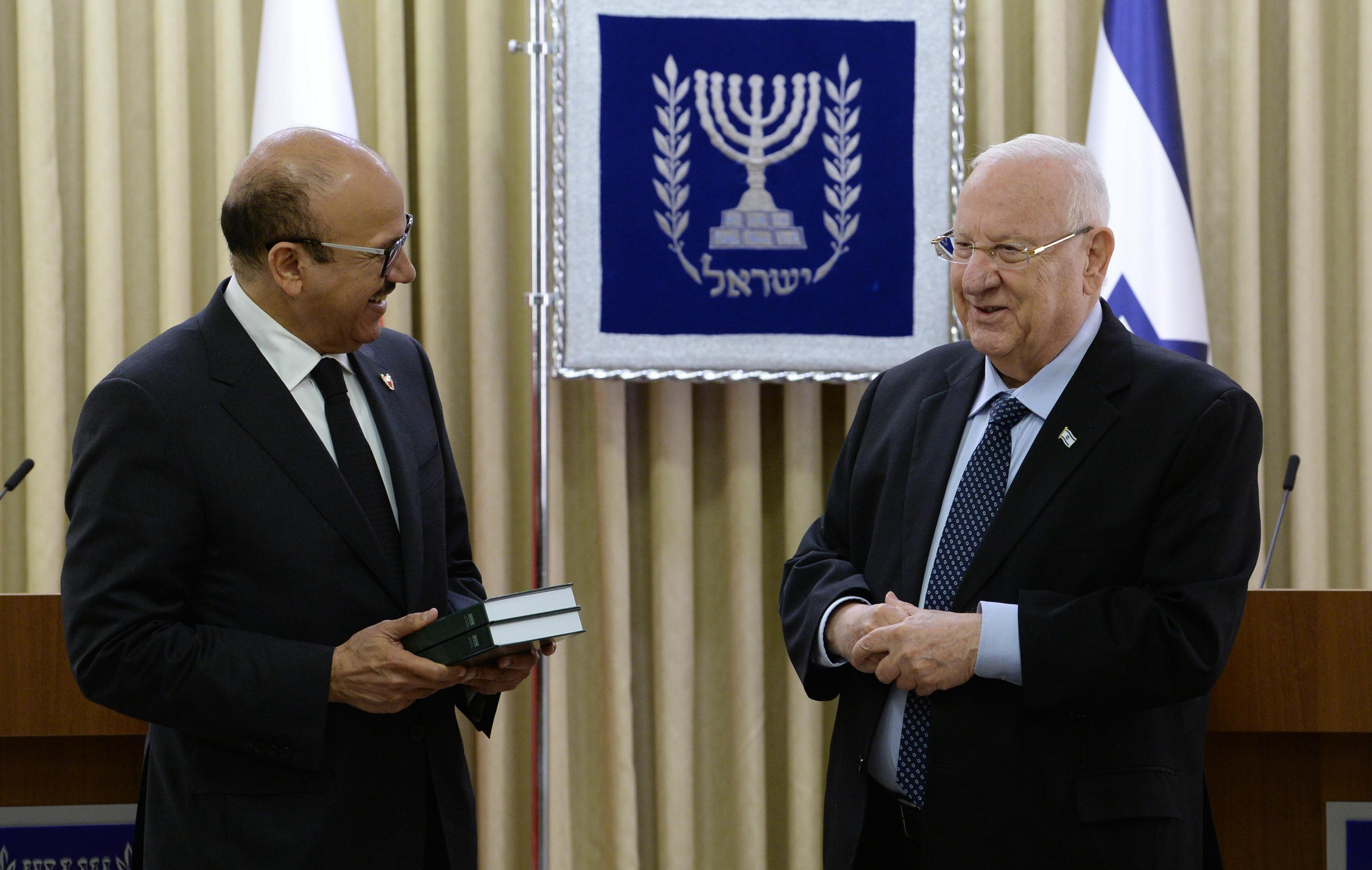
The president of Israel, Reuven Rivlin, meeting with the Foreign Minister of the Kingdom of Bahrain, Abdullatif bin Rashid Al Zayani, Jerusalem, November 2020

On August 13, 2020, President Trump announced that the UAE and Israel were to normalize relations under the Israel–United Arab Emirates peace agreement. Bahrain praised the agreement proclaiming it would contribute to regional stability and peace. Furthermore, as a sign of growing cooperation between the sides, Bahrain and Saudi Arabia permitted overflights of planes from and to Israel, as a sign of support for the deal.

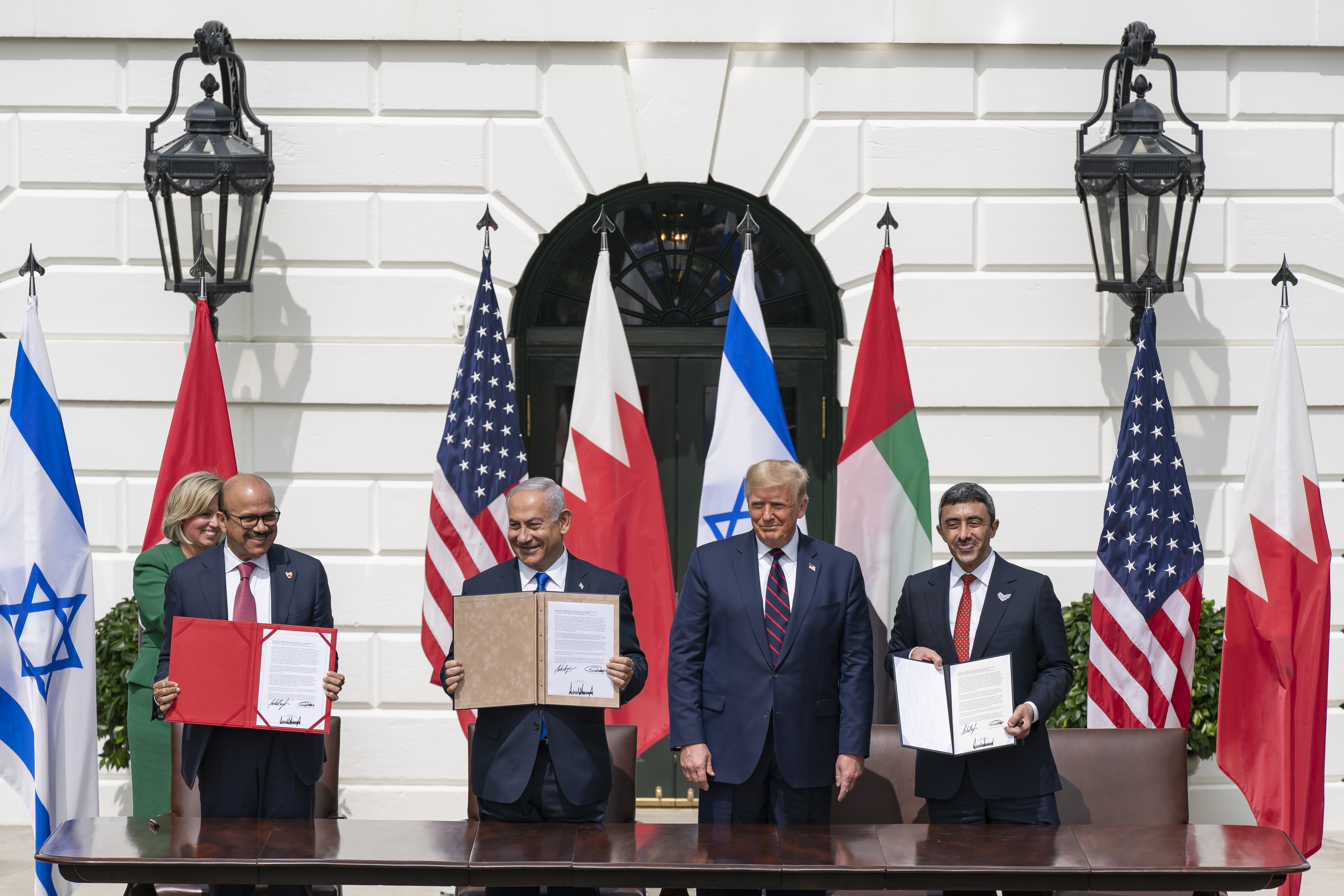
White House Abraham Accords signing ceremony on September 15, 2020

Arab states, while still backing Palestinian rights, are increasingly willing to seek a variety of relationships with Israel. The "piecemeal" approach of the Trump administration makes the best of the inability to secure a resolution to the Israeli–Palestinian conflict, vying instead to normalize relations between Israel and the rest of the Arab countries.

On August 26, 2020, King Hamad bin Isa Al Khalifa told visiting US Secretary of State Mike Pompeo that his country is committed to the creation of a Palestinian state and dismissed Washington's push for Arab countries to normalize relations with Israel. However, on September 11, 2020, it was announced that Bahrain and Israel had agreed to establish full diplomatic relations. Remarking on the date of the announcement, U.S. President Donald Trump said, “There's no more powerful response to the hatred that spawned 9/11.”

== Agreement ==
The two states agreed to establish diplomatic relations, which is the first step for Bahrain to fully normalize its ties with Israel, and although signifying a circumspect Bahraini acceptance of the legitimacy of Israel, HM King Hamad stressed "the need to reach a just and comprehensive peace as a strategic option, in accordance with the two-state solution and relevant resolutions of international legitimacy." Trump said that the two states will exchange ambassadors and open embassies in each country and begin work on cooperation in technology, health, and agriculture, among other areas. The agreement also allows for the establishment of flights between Tel Aviv and Manama. A signing ceremony for the agreement was held in the White House on September 15, 2020. The declaration recognizes each state's sovereignty and states that the two countries have agreed to seek agreements in the future regarding embassies and other topics. The agreement was supplemented by an additional declaration between Israel and Bahrain signed on October 18, 2020, which provided for the establishment of diplomatic relations and their conduct according to the principles of the Charter of the United Nations.

== Reactions ==
Bahrain and Israel Support Oppose Neutral/Ambiguous No public position

- Australia: Australian foreign minister Marise Payne said Australia welcomes the normalization of relations between the two states and called it a courageous step forward peace and security in the Middle East.
- Bahrain: Bahraini King Hamad bin Salman al-Khalifa's senior advisor stated that the normalization deal "sends a positive and encouraging message to the people of Israel, that a just and comprehensive peace with the Palestinian people is the best path and the true interest for their future and the future of the peoples of the region."
- Brazil: The Brazilian government said it was pleased from the agreement between the Kingdom of Bahrain and the State of Israel on the full establishment of their diplomatic relations, as announced in a joint statement by the two countries and the United States of America.
- Canada: Canadian foreign Minister François-Philippe Champagne says Canada welcomes the normalization between Israel and Bahrain saying that it is a positive and important step toward enhancing Middle East peace, stability and security.
- Costa Rica: The Costa Rican Ministry of Foreign Affairs said it welcomes happily the announcement of forming relations between Israel and Bahrain and hopes it will bring stability to the Middle East.
- Croatia: Croatia's foreign ministry stated that it welcomes the agreement between Israel and Bahrein on establishing full diplomatic relations, calling it "another step towards the stability in the region". It also commended the United States for its role in the process.
- Cyprus: The Ministry of foreign affairs said it welcomes the agreement for the establishment of diplomatic relations between the Kingdom of Bahrain and Israel. It added that this agreement constitutes another positive development for peace and stability in the region following a similar decision announced by Israel and the UAE a month before.
- Czech Republic: The Czech Republic welcomed the statement saying "can further strengthen hope for the ever so needed cooperation and peace between countries in the Middle East, providing new impetus for negotiations on resolving the Israeli-Palestinian conflict".
- Egypt: President Abdel Fattah el-Sisi who was one of the first to react appreciated the agreement between Bahrain and Israel and described it as important towards stability and peace in the Middle East region.
- EU: The E.U. welcomed the establishment of the diplomatic relations between the states and recognized the contribution made by the U.S. to reach stability in the Middle East.
- Estonia: Estonian foreign minister Urmas Reinsalu said in Twitter: "I warmly welcome the announcement of normalization of relations between #Israel and #Bahrein, recognizing the role of the United States in the process. This is positive news towards peace and stability in the Middle East".
- Germany: German foreign minister Heiko Maas said: "The establishment of diplomatic relations between Israel and Bahrain is one more important step towards peace in the region".
- Greece: The Greek foreign ministry said Greece welcomes the agreement establishing diplomatic relations between Bahrain and Israel, Adding it sees this development, following a similar agreement between Israel and the UAE, constitutes a very important step towards consolidating peace and stability in the wider Eastern Mediterranean region. Moreover, it recognized the decisive role played by the US and its assistance in achieving this goal and underscored the need to find a comprehensive, two-state solution to the Arab-Israeli conflict, based on international law and the resolutions of the UN Security Council.
- Iran: Hossein Amir-Abdollahian said "Bahrain's and UAE's reckless rulers should not pave the way for the Zionists in the region." Iranian foreign ministry have also condemned the deal and calls Bahrain "sacrificed the Palestinian cause at the altar of American elections ... result will undoubtedly be growing anger and the lasting hatred of the oppressed people of Palestine, Muslims and the free nations of the world".
- Israel: Prime Minister Benjamin Netanyahu said after the announcement of the agreement that "this is a new era of peace. We have invested in peace for many years and now peace will invest in us, bring very large investments to the Israeli economy."
- Jordan: On September 11, 2020, Jordan's foreign minister Ayman Safadi said that the necessary steps to achieve a fair and comprehensive peace in the region should come from Israel and that after the announcement of a normalization of ties between Israel and Bahrain, Israel should "stop all its procedures to undermine the two-states solution, and end the illegal occupation of the Palestinian lands."
- Kosovo: Kosovo's Minister of Foreign Affairs Meliza Haradinaj congratulated Bahrain and Israel on establishing normalised relations.
- Latvia: Latvian Minister of Foreign Affairs Edgars Rinkēvičs said he welcomed the news about the establishment of full diplomatic relations between Israel and Bahrain, saying "it will foster peace and stability in the region". Moreover, he applauded the role of the United States for efforts to facilitate the normalization of relations between Israel and Bahrain.
- Oman: The state media reported that Oman "welcomes the decision to normalize relations" and "hopes this new strategic path taken by some Arab countries will contribute to bringing about a peace based on an end to the Israeli occupation of Palestinian lands and on establishing an independent Palestinian state with East Jerusalem as capital."
- Palestine: The Palestinian leadership denounced the agreement as a betrayal of Jerusalem and the Palestinian cause. The leadership also recalled its ambassador from Manama.
- Romania: Romanian foreign minister Bogdan Aurescu said Romania welcomes the historic announcement on the normalization of relations between Israel and Bahrain, adding this announcement is likely to contribute to greater stability and security in the Middle East.
- Turkey: The Turkish Ministry of Foreign Affairs "strongly denounced and expressed its concern about Bahrain's decision to establish diplomatic relations with Israel. The move was a blow to efforts to defend the Palestinian cause and perpetuated Israel's illegal practices."
- United Arab Emirates: The UAE said that it welcomed the agreement and hoped that it would contribute to peace in the Middle East.
- United Kingdom: The United Kingdom welcomed the agreement normalizing relations between Israel and Bahrain.
- United States: In a tweet, President Donald Trump wrote: "Another historic breakthrough! Our two great friends, Israel and the Kingdom of Bahrain, have reached a peace agreement. This is the second Arab country to make peace with Israel in thirty days."
- Uruguay: The Presidency of the Republic released a press release in which it expressed its satisfaction with the agreement and said that it "hopes that this initiative also includes other nations directly involved in this peace process, within the legal framework approved by the different organs of the nations, states and full respect for the norms of international law."
- Yemen: The Yemeni Ministry of Foreign Affairs said that "there will be no normalization unless the rights of the people are restored in accordance with the Arab Peace Initiative."

Others

- Palestinian Islamic Jihad: In a statement, the PIJ stated that "the Agreement was a new episode in the series of betrayals of Palestine and the Nation, and a flagrant coup against all Arab, national and Islamic parameters pertaining to Palestine."
- The majority party in the Algerian Parliament, the National Liberation Front, described Bahrain's normalization of relations with Israel as a "full-fledged stab and betrayal" of the Palestinian cause. In a statement, the party added that it had "received, with great anger and outrage, Bahrain's ominous announcement of normalization of its relations with the usurped Zionist entity".
- Hezbollah said it "strongly condemns" the move to normalize relations between Israel and Bahrain saying that it was a "great betrayal of the Palestinian people" and added that the "tyrannical regime in Bahrain" had made the move at request of the United States.

== See also ==
- Camp David Accords
- Egypt–Israel peace treaty
- Israel–Jordan peace treaty
- Israel–Morocco normalization agreement
- Israel–Sudan normalization agreement
- Israel–United Arab Emirates normalization agreement
- Kosovo and Serbia economic normalization agreements (2020)
