= Abraham Accords =

2020 series of Arab–Israeli normalization agreements

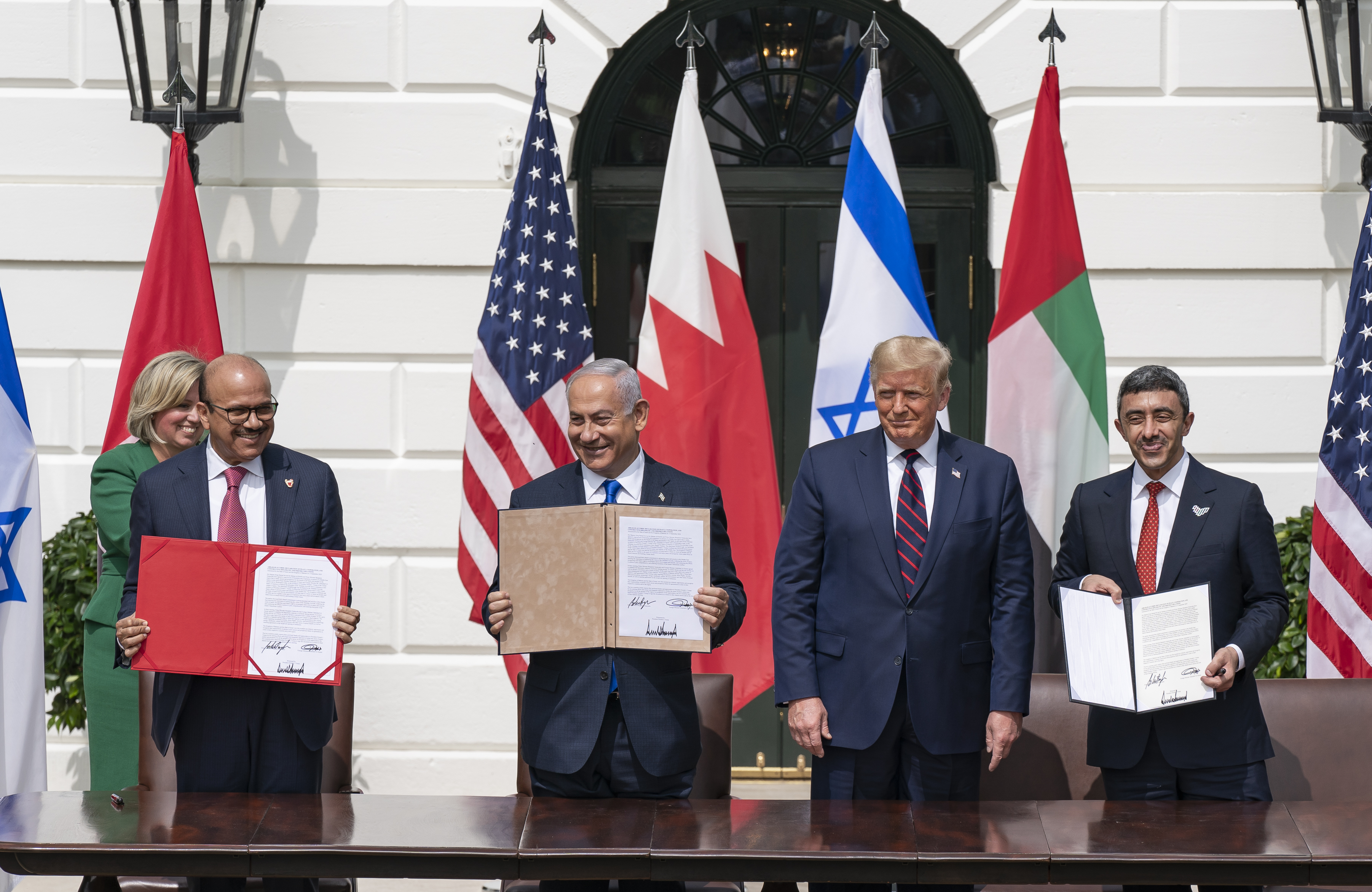
- Representatives (left-to-right): Bahraini foreign minister Abdullatif bin Rashid Al Zayani; Israeli prime minister Benjamin Netanyahu; US president Donald Trump; UAE foreign minister Abdullah bin Zayed Al Nahyan
- Type: Normalization treaty
- Context: Arab–Israeli conflict
- Signed: September 15, 2020
- Location: Washington, D.C., United States
- Negotiators: United States
- Signatories: Bahrain; Israel; United Arab Emirates; Subsequent signatories: Morocco (December 2020); Sudan (January 2021)
- Languages: English; Arabic; Hebrew

The Abraham Accords are a set of agreements that established Arab–Israeli normalization between Israel and several Arab states, beginning with the United Arab Emirates (UAE) and Bahrain. Announced in August and September 2020 and signed in Washington, D.C. on September 15, 2020, the Accords were mediated by the United States under President Donald Trump.

The UAE and Bahrain became the first two Gulf Arab countries to formally recognize Israel and establish friendly relations. The signing by the UAE and Bahrain also made them the first Arab League states to recognize Israel since Mauritania in 1995 and Jordan in 1994. In 1979, Egypt was the first Arab League state to recognize Israel.

In the months following the Accords, Sudan and Morocco also agreed to normalize relations with Israel. As of 2024, Sudan's agreement remains unratified. In July 2025, it was reported that the second Trump administration was seeking to expand the Accords to include Syria, Lebanon, and Saudi Arabia, and in November, it was announced that Kazakhstan agreed to join. In December 2025, Prime Minister Benjamin Netanyahu expanded the Accords on his own initiative after Israel recognized Somaliland (Note: Israel is the only UN member to recognize Somaliland.) as an independent country, with Somaliland pledging to join the Accords.

The Abraham Accords emerged amid growing unofficial cooperation between Israel and Sunni Arab states throughout the 2010s, driven by shared concerns about Iran. Efforts to build ties had become increasingly public by 2018, with visits by Israeli officials to Gulf states and the start of limited military and intelligence cooperation. In mid-2020, a normalization deal between Israel and the UAE was brokered in exchange for the suspension of Israeli plans to annex parts of the West Bank, as proposed in the Trump peace plan.

The agreements formalized economic, diplomatic, and security cooperation. In Morocco's case, normalization came with U.S. recognition of Moroccan sovereignty over Western Sahara. For Sudan, it included removal from the U.S. list of state sponsors of terrorism and access to international financial support. The Accords were presented in elaborate ceremonies and widely promoted by the Trump administration as a major diplomatic achievement.

Reactions in the Arab world were mixed. While governments expressed support, public opinion in many countries remained opposed, particularly due to the Accords' lack of progress on resolving the Israeli–Palestinian conflict. Despite this, the Accords led to new initiatives in trade, defense, energy, technology, and cultural exchange. The name "Abraham Accords" was chosen to reflect the shared heritage of the Abrahamic religions—Christianity, Islam and Judaism.

In May 2026 president Trump suggested that some of Israel's neighbors should be required to sign the Abraham Accords and recognize Israel as part of a peace deal in the war with Iran.

== Background ==
The 20th century saw the Ottoman Empire’s decline and modern, sovereign states established in the Middle East and North Africa (MENA) region, followed by successive Arab-Israeli wars. The 2020 Abraham Accords were preceded by diplomatic milestones including peace treaties, recognition, and normalization agreements between Israel and Arab League countries, starting with neighbors Egypt (in 1979) and Jordan (in 1994), followed by Mauritania (in 1995 and 1999). The Israeli–Palestinian peace process was advanced with the Oslo Accords in 1993 and 1995 but later collapsed with the start of the Second Intifada and the end of peace broker Bill Clinton's term as US president. The 2002 Arab Peace Initiative offered normalisation of relations by the Arab world with Israel, in return for a full withdrawal by Israel from the occupied territories (including the West Bank, Gaza, the Golan Heights, and Lebanon), with the possibility of comparable and mutual agreed minor swaps of the land between Israel and Palestine, a "just settlement" of the Palestinian refugee problem based on UN Resolution 194, and the establishment of a Palestinian state with East Jerusalem as its capital. Israel increased settlement construction in the West Bank and withdrew from Gaza in 2005. After Hamas came to power in Gaza in the 2006 election, Israel began to tighten the Gaza blockade, with Egypt's assistance from 2008 onward. In 2008 and 2009, British Foreign Secretary David Miliband and Jordanian Abdullah II of Jordan endorsed an Arab League nations-based Israel and Arab state diplomatic normalization, or in the former's words "recognition and respect from [22, including a newly-created Palestine] Arab states", termed by both as "a 23-state solution". A rapprochement between Israel and Sunni Arab states took place in the 2010s due to their shared fear of Shiite Iran and its nuclear program. By 2017, unofficial cooperation with Saudi Arabia had been ongoing for at least 5 years, with intelligence services from both countries assisting each other and officials regularly sharing intelligence. By 2016, summits and conferences between high-ranking Israeli–Palestinian and Israeli–Arab politicians and direct contacts between their security and intelligence services had not only become routine but were openly discussed in major Arab media.

In 2018, the Omani foreign minister visited Jerusalem, and Netanyahu, accompanied by his national security advisor and the head of Mossad, visited Oman in October "to advance the peace process in the Middle East as well as several matters of joint interest regarding the achievement of peace and stability in the Middle East", according to a joint statement. Also in October 2018, the Israeli sports minister attended the 2018 Judo Grand Slam Abu Dhabi. Two Israeli judokas won gold medals, and Israel's national anthem was played during the award ceremonies, a first at Gulf state sporting events. In August 2019, Israel's foreign minister announced military cooperation with the Emirates amidst rising tensions with Iran.

The February 2019 Warsaw Conference was proposed by the US with the intent to build up a coalition against Iran. Due to West European states opposing withdrawal from the Iran nuclear deal and resumption of economic sanctions against Iran, host Poland played down the anti-Iranian aspects of the two-day conference, and the closing Polish-US statement did not mention Iran. Among the representatives of the 70 nations in attendance were a number of Arab officials, creating the first situation since the Madrid Peace Conference in 1991 where an Israeli leader and senior Arab officials were all in attendance at the same international conference focused on the Middle East. The Madrid Conference at the time set the stage for the Oslo Accords. Among those with whom Israeli prime minister Benjamin Netanyahu met was the Omani Foreign Minister Yusuf bin Alawi bin Abdullah—whose country he had visited in October 2018. Two days after Netanyahu's visit at the time, bin Alawi suggested while at a conference in Bahrain that it was time for Israel to be treated like the other states in the Middle East, and the officials of Bahrain and Saudi Arabia did not disagree.

In January 2020, Trump announced the Trump peace plan for the Middle East in a joint press conference with Israeli prime minister Benjamin Netanyahu. The plan provided for a unified Jerusalem as Israel's capital and Israeli sovereignty over the Jordan Valley and the principal Jewish settlements in the West Bank, amounting to annexation of roughly 30% of the territory. The Palestinians would receive land near the Egyptian border, a certain degree of sovereignty, and a state with numerous Israeli enclaves. The New York Times wrote that "[r]ather than viewing it as a serious blueprint for peace, analysts called it a political document by a president in the middle of an impeachment."

== History ==
=== Agreements between Israel and the United Arab Emirates and Bahrain ===
Signatory nations of the September 15, 2020, agreements Bahrain Israel United Arab Emirates

When Netanyahu took office in May 2020, he hinted that his cabinet would begin discussing annexation of parts of the West Bank, as envisioned in the Trump peace plan, in July. On June 12, 2020, Emirati ambassador to the US Yousef Al Otaiba published an op-ed on the front page of Yedioth Ahronoth warning that annexation of West Bank territory would put a stop to normalization of relations with the Emirates and other Arab states.

At the end of June, Al Otaiba told Trump's son-in-law and senior adviser, Jared Kushner, and his assistant, Avi Berkowitz, that the United Arab Emirates would agree to normalization with Israel in return for an Israeli announcement that West Bank annexation was "off the table". The White House also had reservations about annexation, which Berkowitz had discussed with Netanyahu over three days of meetings in June 2020. Berkowitz then told Netanyahu of Al Otaiba's offer of the UAE alternative to annexation. On July 2, 2020, Al Otaiba met with Berkowitz to further discuss the plan. Along with a mutual opposition to Iran, the concerns detailed by Al Otaiba's op-ed and planning with Kushner and Berkowitz helped bring vested parties to the negotiating table to identify an alternative solution that ultimately resulted in a normalization agreement reached in August 2020. As a result of the deal, annexation was postponed.

Hours after the August 13 announcement of the agreement between Israel and the Emirates, senior Bahraini officials called Kushner and Berkowitz with the message "We want to be next." Over the next 29 days, Kushner and Berkowitz negotiated with and traveled to Bahrain before closing the deal on September 11, 2020, in a call between Trump, Netanyahu, and the king of Bahrain.

Israeli prime minister Netanyahu, Emirati foreign minister Abdullah bin Zayed Al Nahyan, and Bahraini foreign minister Abdullatif bin Rashid Al Zayani signed the agreements on September 15, 2020, on the Truman Balcony overlooking the South Lawn of the White House in a grand ceremony which the Washington Post portrayed as a way to bolster Trump's "standing as a statesman".

==== Developments after the Gaza war ====
On November 2, 2023, in view of the ongoing Gaza war, Bahrain said that it had recalled its ambassador to Israel and that the Israeli ambassador had left Bahrain. Israel said that its relations with Bahrain were stable.

Following the escalation of the Gaza conflict, several indicators suggested a decline in the pace of economic and defense engagement between Israel and the Arab signatories of the Abraham Accords. In October 2025, organizers of the Dubai Airshow announced that Israeli security and defense companies would not participate in the event. The decision, described by officials as the result of a “technical review,” was viewed by analysts as reflecting growing political sensitivities and a cooling of public cooperation between the United Arab Emirates and Israel in the aftermath of the war.

=== Sudan ===
On October 23, 2020, Israel and Sudan agreed to normalize ties in an agreement mediated by Trump administration officials. As part of the agreement, the US removed Sudan from its list of state sponsors of terrorism and gave it a US$1.2 billion loan to help the Sudanese government clear the country's debts to the World Bank. Sudan agreed to pay US$335 million in compensation to American victims of terror, but denied any wrongdoing. On January 6, 2021, the government of Sudan signed the "Abraham Accords Declaration" in Khartoum.

On February 2, 2023, Israel and Sudan announced they had finalized an agreement to normalize relations, with the signing to take place after the establishment of a civilian government in Sudan. Normalization is widely opposed in Sudan, and fighting between rival military factions has delayed the signing.

=== Agreement between Israel and Morocco ===
On December 10, 2020, President Trump announced that Israel and the Kingdom of Morocco had agreed to establish full diplomatic relations. The agreement was negotiated by Trump senior adviser Jared Kushner and Middle East envoy Avi Berkowitz and marked Kushner and Berkowitz's fourth normalization agreement in as many months. As a component of the deal, the United States agreed to recognize Moroccan sovereignty over the Western Sahara.

=== Kazakhstan ===
On November 6, 2025, US and Israeli officials said that Kazakhstan was poised to announce its entry into the Abraham Accords during a meeting of five Central Asian leaders, including Kazakh president Kassym-Jomart Tokayev, with Trump at the White House later that day. US Special Envoy Steve Witkoff had earlier announced that an unnamed country would join. Trump later confirmed that Kazakhstan would join, making it the first country to do so during his second presidency. The move was described as "largely symbolic", given Kazakhstan's distance from Israel and the fact that it has held diplomatic relations with Israel since 1992, but US officials said the deal would increase bilateral trade and collaboration between the two nations.

In early 2026, Kazakhstan formalized its entry into the Abraham Accords, marking the first expansion of the framework into Central Asia. The formalization established a structured strategic partnership with Israel focusing on cybersecurity and water management, while maintaining support for a two-state solution to the Middle East conflict.

=== Somaliland ===
As part of Israel's recognition of Somaliland on 26 December 2025, Somaliland has pledged to join the Abraham Accords.

== Documents ==
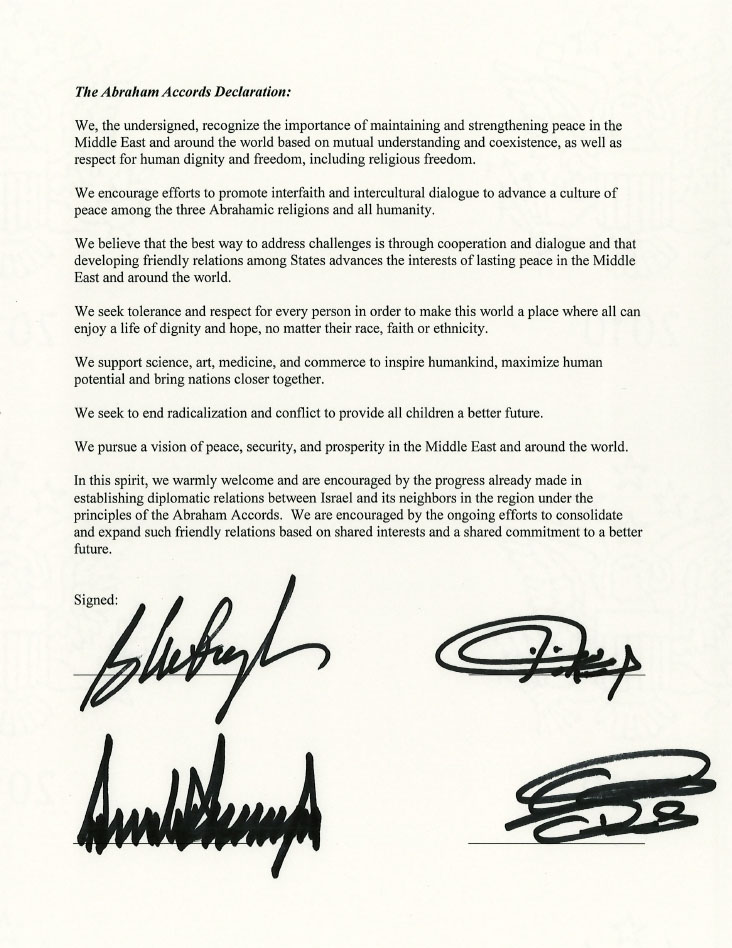
Abraham Accords Declaration

The documents related to the Abraham Accords are as follows:

Name	Official name	Date	Signatories	Full text
Declaration	The Abraham Accords Declaration	September 15, 2020	United States, Israel, United Arab Emirates, Bahrain	
Israel–UAE Agreement	Abraham Accords Peace Agreement: Treaty of Peace, Diplomatic Relations and Full Normalization Between the United Arab Emirates and the State of Israel	September 15, 2020	Israel, United Arab Emirates, United States (witness)	
Bahrain–Israel Agreement	Abraham Accords: Declaration of Peace, Cooperation, and Constructive Diplomatic and Friendly Relations	September 15, 2020	Bahrain, Israel, United States (witness)	

== Aftermath ==
=== Protests and violence ===
After Trump left office, in February 2021, State Department spokesperson Ned Price said that "the United States will continue to urge other countries to normalize relations with Israel" and that normalization is "not a substitute for Israeli-Palestinian peace... We hope that Israel and other countries in the region join together in a common effort to build bridges and... contribute to tangible progress towards the goal of advancing a negotiated peace between Israelis and Palestinians." Axios reported in March 2021 that the Biden administration supports widening the normalization process to other countries and that it prefers the term "normalization process" to "Abraham Accords". In March 2021, a group of 18 US senators introduced a bill to aid the State Department in developing an appropriate strategy "to strengthen and expand the Abraham Accords and other related normalization agreements with Israel."

The normalization agreements were criticized by citizens of the four Arab states that signed the accords as well as many citizens of other Arab countries, especially because they failed to make progress resolving the Palestinian conflict. The criticism increased in May 2021 after violent protests erupted in Jerusalem, Hamas fired rockets into Israel, and Israel retaliated with airstrikes on Gaza. A Fatah Central Committee member said the Abraham Accords, were "one of the reasons" for the October 7, 2023, attack by Hamas on Israel.

=== United Arab Emirates ===
In August 2020, the Emirates for the first time established telephone links to Israel by unblocking direct dialing to Israel's +972 country code.

As the war in Gaza escalated, Dhahi Khalfan, the deputy chief of police in Dubai, said that Israel "proved that its intentions are evil" and that the Gulf leaders must "reconsider the issue of dealing with Israel". However, the Emirati officials didn't express any intentions to cut ties with Israel.

=== Morocco ===
In August 2021, the agreement was cited by Algeria as one of the reasons for unilaterally cutting relations with Morocco.

In November 2021, the Israeli minister of defense, Benny Gantz, signed a joint security understandings agreement with Moroccan defense minister Abdellatif Loudiyi, the first time that Israel openly signed such an agreement with an Arab state. The agreement formalized the defense ties between the two countries, allowing for smoother cooperation between their defense establishments.

=== Oman ===
Oman postponed a decision to normalize ties with Israel until after the US presidential election on November 3, 2020. In February 2021, Foreign Minister Badr al-Busaidi said that Oman would keep their level of "relations and dialogue" with Israel, involving the "appropriate channels of communication", and that Oman was "committed to peace between Israel and the Palestinians based on a two-state solution."

=== Expansion to other states ===
In June 2023, U.S. Secretary of State Antony Blinken warned Israel that rising tensions with the Palestinians, including through advancing settlement activity, threatened the expansion of normalization agreements with Arab nations, particularly Saudi Arabia. Speaking alongside Blinken earlier in June, the Saudi Foreign Minister had stated that "without finding a pathway to peace for the Palestinian people ... any normalization will have limited benefits." Even so, following the end of hostilities between Iran and Israel in July 2025, it was reported that the second Trump administration was initiating the expansion of the accords to include Syria, Lebanon and Saudi Arabia, with "direct dialogues" being held between Israel and Syria at the time. A month later, Syrian president Ahmed al-Sharaa stated that Syria would not join the accords, claiming that the country's tensions with Israel were considerably different than those of other Arab states. U.S. Special Envoy to the Middle East Steve Witkoff has suggested up to six countries could join the Accords, including Libya, Azerbaijan and Armenia, despite the latter two nations having existing diplomatic relations with Israel. Azerbaijan has also reportedly contacted Kazakhstan to gauge interest in a broader Abraham Accords expansion.

On September 29, 2025, in a speech delivered at a White House press conference, Donald Trump announced that Israel had agreed to the Trump 20-Point Gaza Peace Plan and stated that the Abraham Accords could potentially be expanded to include additional countries, including Iran. In May 2026 president Trump suggested that some of Israel's neighbors should be required to sign the Abraham Accords and recognize Israel as part of a peace deal in the war with Iran.

In October 2026, Saudi Arabia signed a statement along with Egypt, Turkey, and Saudi Arabia, declaring that Israel as "the fundamental source of instability in the region and beyond." Nevertheless, Gulf analyst Ahmed Alkhuzaie said that this does not mean that Saudi Arabia has abandoned interest in joining the Abraham Accords.

=== Abraham Fund ===
The Abraham Fund was a program established by the US Government that was supposed to raise $3 billion to boost trade and agriculture in the region, facilitate access to clean water and affordable electricity, and "enable strategic infrastructure projects". The fund was set up as an arm of the newly-formed U.S. International Development Finance Corporation (DFC) and to be overseen by the DFC's chief executive officer Adam Boehler, who had been Kushner's college roommate. Its first projects were reported to be the upgrading of checkpoints between Israel and Palestinian territories and a gas pipeline to be built between the Red Sea and the Mediterranean. Despite numerous visits by Kushner and US secretary of the treasury Steven Mnuchin with rulers in the region in the last months of the Trump presidency, the fund never received any money, and no projects were ever begun. Following the transition to the Biden administration and the resignation of its Trump-appointed manager, the future of the fund was thrown into question.

=== Jordan solar power plant ===
In November 2021, Israel, the Emirates, and Jordan signed a letter of intent for the sale of the electricity generated by a solar power plant with 600 MW capacity to Israel, produced by solar farms in Jordan to be built by the UAE government-owned Masdar, while Israel would sell 200 million cubic meters of desalinated water to Jordan each year. A renewed memorandum of understanding was signed in November 2022. The purchase agreements were scheduled to be signed in November 2023 at the COP28 climate change conference in Dubai but were removed from the agenda because of the Gaza war.

== Economic impact ==
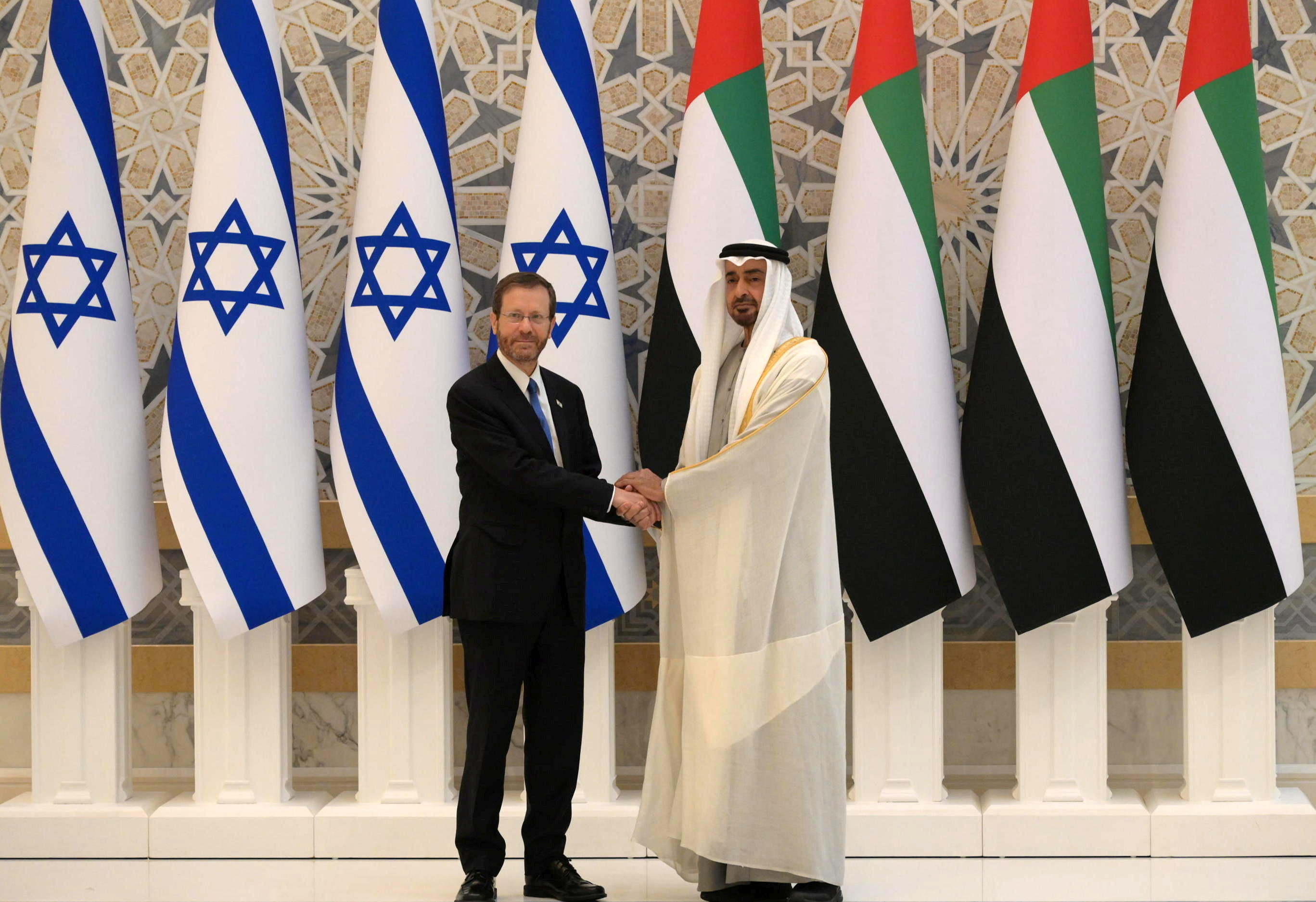
Israeli president Isaac Herzog with Emirati president Mohamed bin Zayed Al Nahyan in Abu Dhabi, January 2022

While Israel and the Emirates had long-maintained de facto recognition in areas of business including the diamond trade, and high tech industries including artificial intelligence and defense, the accord opened the door to a much wider range of economic cooperation, including formal investments. In November 2021, OurCrowd Arabia became the first Israeli venture capital firm to receive a license from the Abu Dhabi Global Market (ADGM), and in November 2022, OurCrowd launched Integrated Data Intelligence Ltd. (IDI), offering artificial intelligence for business, in Abu Dhabi as part of a $60 million joint investment with the Abu Dhabi Investment Office. Together with OurCrowd, in November 2022, fintech company Liquidity Group opened an office as part of a $545 million government incentive program.

A host of Israeli and Emirati law enterprises including law firms and healthcare providers announced collaborations. Lishot, an Israeli water quality testing company was among the first Israeli firms making direct deliveries to Dubai. A number of kosher restaurants were opened in the Emirates to cater to Jewish visitors. Abu Dhabi Investment Office opened its first overseas branch in Israel. Emirati businesses and individuals began acquiring stakes in Israeli assets, such as Beitar Jerusalem football team, Haifa Port Company, and Israir Airlines.

According to Israel's Ministry of Defense, the value of Israeli defense exports to countries with which it normalized relations in 2020 reached $791 million.

Trump's envoy Jared Kushner, his treasury secretary Steve Mnuchin, and his ambassador to Israel David Friedman, now have ownership stakes in funds receiving billions of dollars of investments directly from the governments of Saudi Arabia, the Emirates, and Qatar, raising complaints about conflicts of interest.

In early 2026, Israel's Finance Ministry announced that the country had raised $6 billion through an international bond offering, attracting investment interest from about 300 investors in over 30 countries, including some states that have signed the Abraham Accords.

== Environmental impact ==
On August 14, 2021, the Associated Press reported that a secret oil deal between Israel and the Emirates, struck in 2020 as part of the Abraham Accords, had turned the Israeli resort town of Eilat into a waypoint for Emirati oil headed for Western markets. It was expected to endanger the Red Sea reefs, which host some of the greatest coral diversity on the planet. As Jordan, Egypt, and Saudi Arabia also share the gulf's waters, an ecological disaster would likely impact their ecosystems as well.

== Collaborative efforts ==
In mid-December 2020, a delegation from the Emirates and Bahrain visited Israel, the occupied Golan Heights and Jerusalem with the aim of cultural exchange as part of the normalization process. The delegations held a meeting with Israel President Reuven Rivlin. In January 2021, a collaborative event was organized by Tel Aviv International Salon, Sharaka, and OurCrowd to attain the 'business of peace' between Persian Gulf countries and the state of Israel.

From March 23–25, 2021, a virtual hackathon event was organized by Israel-is, which gathered participants from the Emirates, Bahrain, Morocco, and Israel. Then on March 27, 2021, an event was organized to commemorate International Holocaust Memorial Day, which saw participation from the Emirates, Bahrain, Morocco, and Saudi Arabia.

March 2021 also saw the Israeli and Emirati national rugby teams play their first-ever match, in honor of the Abraham Accords. In June 2021, influencers from UAE, Bahrain, Morocco, and Egypt visited Magen David Adom, Israel's ambulance service, focused on Magen David Adom's "lifesaving work and its technological expertise". The visit was filmed for "Finding Abraham", a film that was premiered at the UN on the anniversary of the signing of the Abraham Accords in September 2021.

The exiled Iranian crown prince Reza Pahlavi has proposed a peace agreement, referred to as the "Cyrus Accords", between a post-Islamic Republic Iranian regime and Israel.

== Opinion polling ==
Surveys show that in Arab countries that have signed normalization agreements with Israel, the majority of citizens view the Abraham Accords negatively.

In November 2022, 76% of Saudi respondents said they had negative views of the Abraham Accords. According to the poll conducted by The Washington Institute for Near East Policy between November 14 and December 6, 2023, 96% of Saudi participants believed that Arab nations should cut ties with Israel, and only 16% of Saudis approved the view that Hamas should accept a two-state solution.

== See also ==
- 2026 Israel–Lebanon peace talks
- Arab–Israeli alliance – Diplomatic rapprochement between Israel and Arab monarchies
- Camp David Accords – 1978 political agreement between Egypt and Israel
- Egypt–Israel peace treaty
- Indo-Abrahamic Alliance – Proposed regional bloc in the Middle East
- Iran–Israel proxy conflict
- Iran–Saudi Arabia proxy conflict – Indirect conflict between Iran and Saudi Arabia
- Isaac Accords – Diplomatic initiative between Israel and Latin America
- Israel–Jordan peace treaty – 1994 agreement between the State of Israel and the Hashemite Kingdom of Jordan
