= Osman Abdilahi Jama =

Somali politician and former Minister of Foreign Affairs of Somaliland

- Cismaan Cabdilaahi Jaamac
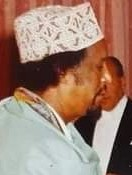

Minister of Foreign Affairs of Somaliland
- In office June 1993 – September 1995
- President: Muhammad Haji Ibrahim Egal
- Preceded by: Yusuf Sheikh Ali Madar
- Succeeded by: Mohamed Abdi Dhinbil

Osman Abdilahi Jama (Somali: Cismaan Cabdilaahi Jaamac), commonly known as Saylici, was a Somali politician who served as the second Minister of Foreign Affairs of Somaliland from 1993 to 1995 under President Muhammad Haji Ibrahim Egal.

== Career ==
=== Early life and education ===
Osman Abdillahi Jama was born around 1940 in the district of Aynabo in present-day Somaliland. He completed his secondary education in Amoud and Sheikh schools before joining the Ministry of Foreign Affairs of the former Somali Republic.

=== Diplomatic career ===
He worked in the Somali Ministry of Foreign Affairs during the 1960s and 1970s and later served as Somalia’s ambassador to Yemen, Kuwait, Turkey, and other major countries. During his tenure, he was recognized as one of the knowledgeable Somali diplomats involved in both economic and political affairs.

=== Foreign Minister of Somaliland ===
After joining the Somali National Movement (SNM), Osman played an advisory role in matters of economy and diplomacy within the organization.

After becoming president in May 1993, Muhammad Haji Ibrahim Egal formed his cabinet in June 1993, appointing Osman Abdilahi Jama as Minister of Foreign Affairs.

Although Osman Abdilahi Jama was appointed as Somaliland’s foreign minister, many of the government’s foreign relations were conducted personally by President Egal, and some contemporary sources list Egal as concurrently holding the foreign affairs portfolio.

In September 1995, President Egal carried out a cabinet reshuffle, during which Mohamed Abdi Dhinbil was appointed as Minister of Foreign Affairs.

=== After that ===
After which he shifted his focus to private business.

Osman Abdilahi Jama died in March 2024.
