= Abdihamid Garad Jama =

Somali politician

- Cabdihamiid Garaad Jaamac

Minister of Foreign Affairs and International Cooperation of Somaliland
- In office 2001–2002
- President: Muhammad Haji Ibrahim Egal
- Preceded by: Mohamoud Salah Nur
- Succeeded by: Mohamed Said Gees

Minister of Justice of Somaliland
- In office 2002–2003
- President: Muhammad Haji Ibrahim Egal

Abdihamid Garad Jama (Somali: Cabdihamiid(C/Xamiid) Garaad Jaamac) was a Somali politician who served as the Minister of Foreign Affairs and International Cooperation of Somaliland from 2001 to 2002.

== Biography ==
Abdihamid was originally from the Sool region.

=== Foreign Minister of Somaliland (2001–2002) ===
In 2001, Abdihamid was appointed as Minister of Foreign Affairs and International Cooperation, succeeding Mohamoud Salah Nur (Fagadhe).

In May 2001, President Egal sought to hold Somaliland's constitutional referendum in Las Anod, a potentially disputed area with Puntland, but after the two prominent Dhulbahante traditional leaders, Garad Abdiqani Garad Jama and Garad Saleban Garad Mohamed, phoned Egal to request cancellation, Foreign Minister Abdihamid—who had been transporting the ballot boxes to Las Anod—was recalled and the vote there was halted.

In October 2001, Abdihamid headed a Somaliland delegation to Djibouti for talks on reopening the border and strengthening bilateral relations.

=== Justice Minister of Somaliland (2002–2003) ===
In March 2002, President Egal carried out another cabinet reshuffle less than a month after the previous one. In this reshuffle, former Foreign Minister Abdihamid was appointed Minister of Justice, and Mohamed Said Gees became the new Foreign Minister.

On 3 May 2002, following the death of President Egal, Vice President Kahin became acting president. Kahin was formally elected president in the April 2003 presidential election. In July 2003, President Kahin carried out a cabinet reshuffle, and Ahmed Hassan Ali Libaax was appointed Minister of Justice. The new Minister of Justice who succeeded Abdihamid was a younger politician from the same region as him.

=== Interior Minister of Puntland (2008–2009) ===
In July 2008, Puntland President Mohamud Muse Hersi appointed Abdihamid as Puntland's Minister of Interior.

In December 2008, following a cabinet-level meeting in Puntland's capital, Garowe, Abdihamid stated that the government delegation's recent visit to Ethiopia had been successful.

In January 2009, newly elected Puntland President Abdirahman Farole appointed his former presidential rival Abdullahi Ahmed Jama as the new Minister of Interior. Abdihamid, who had served in the position under the previous administration, was reportedly in Djibouti and did not attend the handover ceremony; instead, the Deputy Minister of Interior represented the ministry.
