= 2024 Taiwanese general election =

Election in Taiwan

- 13 January 2024
- Presidential election
- Opinion polls
- Turnout: 71.86% (▼3.04pp)
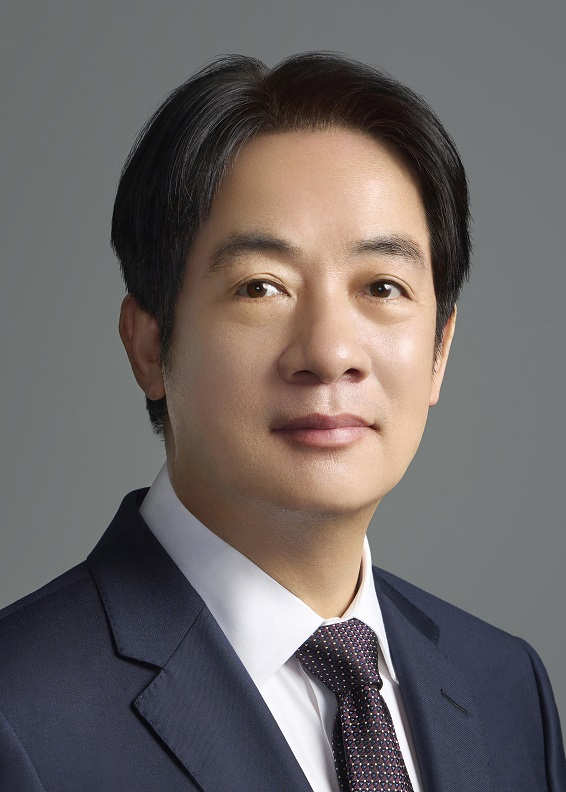

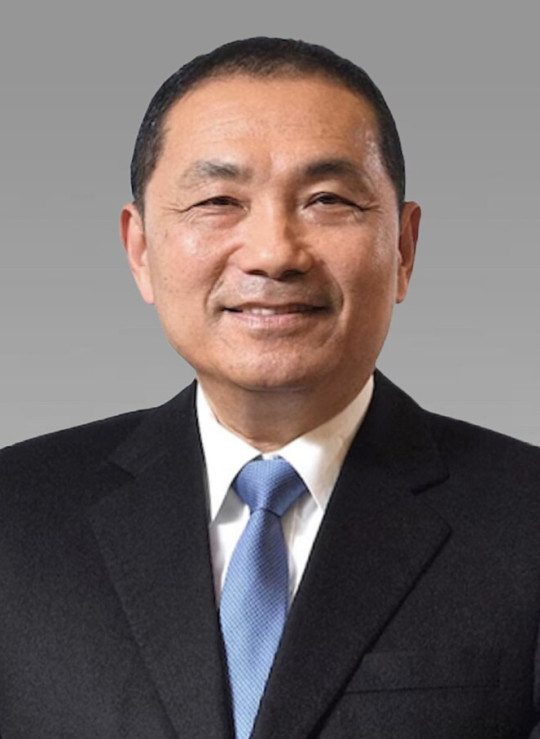

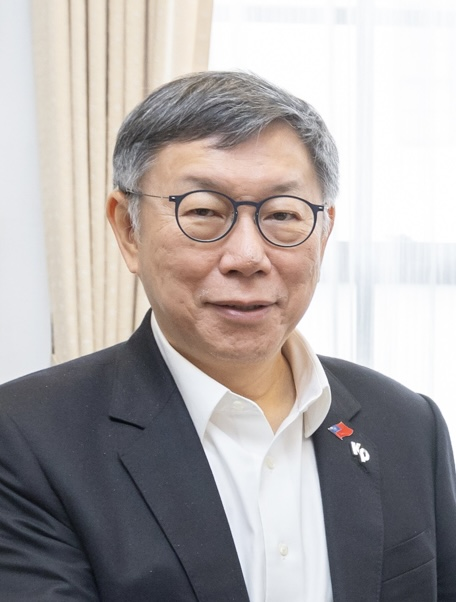
Nominee	Lai Ching-te	Hou Yu-ih	Ko Wen-je
Party	DPP	Kuomintang	People's
Running mate	Hsiao Bi-khim	Jaw Shaw-kong	Cynthia Wu
Popular vote	5,586,019	4,671,021	3,690,466
Percentage	40.05%	33.49%	26.46%
President before election
Tsai Ing-wen
DPP
Elected President
Lai Ching-te
DPP
- Legislative election
- All 113 seats in the Legislative Yuan; 57 seats needed for a majority
- Turnout: 71.79% (▼3.07 pp, party-list); 74.93% (▼3.65 pp, constituency)
Party	Leader	Vote %	Seats	+/–
DPP	Lai Ching-te	36.16	51	−10
Kuomintang	Eric Chu	34.58	52	+14
People's	Ko Wen-je	22.07	8	+3
Independent	–	–	2	−3
This lists parties that won seats. See the complete results below.
President of the Legislative Yuan before	President of the Legislative Yuan after
You Si-kun; DPP	Han Kuo-yu; Kuomintang

The 2024 Taiwanese general elections were held in Taiwan, on Saturday, 13 January 2024 to elect the 16th president and vice president of the Republic of China, and all 113 members of the 11th Legislative Yuan.

For further information about the elections, see:

- 2024 Taiwanese presidential election
- 2024 Taiwanese legislative election

== See also ==
- 2020 Taiwanese general election
