= Liban Yusuf Osman =

Somaliland politician

Liban Yusuf Osman ليبان يوسف عثمان
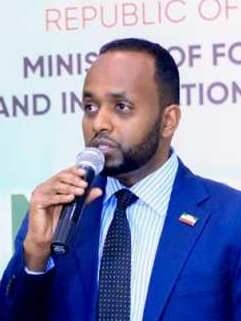

Deputy Minister of Health Development
- Incumbent
- Assumed office 2 September 2021
- President: Muse Bihi Abdi

Deputy and Acting Minister of Foreign Affairs
- In office December 2019 – September 2021
- President: Muse Bihi Abdi
- Preceded by: Abdinasir Omer Jama

Deputy Minister of Health Development
- In office April 2019 – December 2019
- President: Muse Bihi Abdi
- Preceded by: Abdikadir Omar Jama

Deputy Minister of Public Works and Housing
- In office January 2016 – December 2017
- President: Ahmed Mohamed Mohamoud
- Preceded by: Abdi Mohamed Hirad

Director of Land & Urban Management Institute
- In office January 2016 – December 2016
- President: Ahmed Mohamed Mohamoud

Personal details
- Born: Hargeisa, Somali Democratic Republic (now Somaliland)
- Party: Peace, Unity, and Development Party
- Education: University of Hargeisa
- Liban Yusuf Osman on X

Liban Yusuf Osman (Somali: Liibaan Yuusuf Cismaan, Arabic: ليبان يوسف عثمان ) is a Somali politician, who is currently serving as the Deputy Minister of Health Development. He formerly served as the Deputy and acting Minister of Foreign Affairs of Somaliland. A year and a half ago, Liban formerly served the same position of the Deputy Minister of Health Development of Somaliland. He also served as the deputy Minister of Public Works and Housing of Somaliland.

== Political career ==
- On December 4, 2016, former president of the Republic of Somaliland Ahmed Mohamed Mohamoud appointed Liban as the Deputy Public Works and Housing Minister.
- After the 2017 Somaliland presidential election, President Muse Bihi Abdi appointed Liban as the Deputy Minister of Foreign Affairs of Somaliland.
- In a mini cabinet reshuffle on March 30, 2019, president Muse Bihi Abdi transferred Liban to Deputy Health Minister of Somaliland post.
- Liban was appointed for the current post as the deputy Minister of Foreign Affairs by president Muse Bihi Abdi after a major cabinet reshuffle in December 2019.
- In March 2021, Liban assumed the acting Minister of Foreign Affairs of Somaliland role after former foreign minister Yasin Haji Mohamoud Hiir Faratoon tendered his resignation to President Muse Bihi Abdi to run for parliament in May 2021 elections.

== Early life and education ==
Liban was born and raised in Hargeisa. He completed his Primary and High School formal education in Hargeisa, Somaliland. Liban graduated from the University of Hargeisa where he studied Bachelor's Degree in Economics and Master's Degree in Project Management. Prior to public career, Liban worked at Somaliland Beverage Industries (SBI) as a Sales and Marketing Manager. He also worked as Operational Manager at Lumatron Qatar W.L.L in Doha, Qatar.

== See also ==
- Ministry of Foreign Affairs (Somaliland)
- Ministry of Public Works and Housing (Somaliland)
- Ministry of Health (Somaliland)
- List of Somaliland politicians
- Politics of Somaliland
- Republic of Somaliland Representative Office in Taiwan
