= Ministry of Foreign Affairs (Somaliland) =

Government ministry of Somaliland

Republic of Somalia Ministry of Foreign Affairs
- Wasaarada Arimaha Dibada
- Coat of arms of Somaliland

Ministry overview
- Formed: 1991; 35 years ago
- Jurisdiction: Somaliland
- Headquarters: Hargeisa, Maroodi Jeh (Somaliland)
- Minister responsible: Abdirahman Dahir, Minister of Foreign Affairs (Somaliland)
- Ministry executives: Roda Jama Elmi, Deputy Minister; Ahmed Abokor Mohmed, Director General Mohamed Abdirahman Hassan
- Website: mfagovsomaliland.org

Footnotes
- Ministry of Foreign Affairs on Facebook Ministry of Foreign Affairs on X

The Ministry of Foreign Affairs and International Cooperation of the Republic of Somaliland (Somali: Wasaarada Arrimaha Dibadda iyo Iskaashiga Caalamiga ah ee Jamhuuriyadda Somaliland) (Arabic: وزارة الخارجية والتعاون الدولي) is the Somaliland Government ministry which oversees the foreign relations of Somaliland. The present foreign minister is Abdirahman Dahir Adan.

== List of ministers of foreign affairs ==
- Yuusuf Sheekh Cali Madar
- Osman Abdilahi Jama
- Mohamed Abdi Dhinbil “Galbeedi”
- Saleban Mohamoud Adan
- Mohamoud Salah nur (Fagadhe)
- Abdihakim Garad Jama
- 2002-2003: Mohamed Saed Gees
- 2003-2006: Drs. Edna Adan Ismail
- 2006-2010: Abdilahi Mohamed Dualeh
- 2010-2013: Mohammad Abdullahi Omar
- 2013-2015: Mahamed Biihi Yonis
- 2015-2018: Dr. Saad Ali Shire
- 2018-2021: Yasin Haji Mohamoud “Faratoon”
- 2021: Liban Yusuf Osman (Acting Foreign Minister)
- 2021-2024: Dr. Essa Kayd Mahamud
- 2024-present: Abdirahman Dahir Adam Bakal

== See also ==
- Diplomatic missions of Somaliland
- Foreign relations of Somaliland
- List of diplomatic missions in Somaliland
