= Inauguration of Lai Ching-te =

2024 Taiwanese presidential inauguration

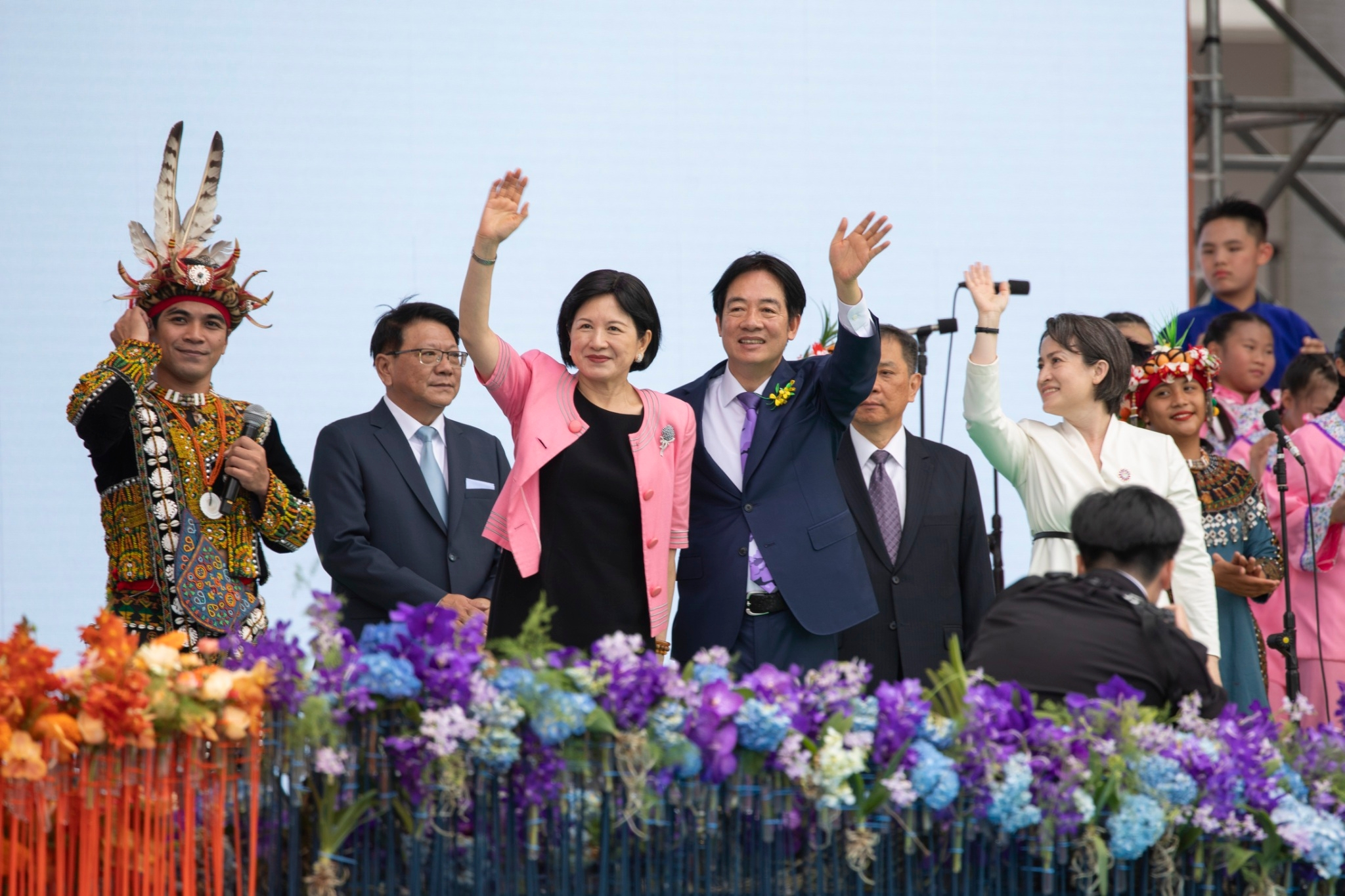
- Lai and first lady Wu Mei-ju waving at the crowd
- Date: May 20, 2024; 2 years ago
- Location: Presidential Office Building, Taipei
- Participants: Hosts: Jasmine Liu; Ethan Liu; Deponents: 14th President of the Republic of China Lai Ching-te; 14th Vice President of the Republic of China Hsiao Bi-khim; Custodians: Judicial Yuan president and Chief Justice Hsu Tzong-li; Audience: Outgoing president Tsai Ing-wen; Incoming Secretary-General to the President, Secretary-General of the National Security Council, Premier of the Executive Yuan, members of the cabinet; Legislative Yuan, Control Yuan, and Examination Yuan presidents and vice presidents; Former vice presidents Annette Lu and Chen Chien-jen; Leaders of major parties; Delegates of various countries

The inauguration of Lai Ching-te as the 14th president of the Republic of China took place on May 20, 2024, marking the start of the four-year term of Lai Ching-te as president and Hsiao Bi-khim as vice president, and the first time a political party started a third term since the implementation of direct elections in 1994. The inauguration took place in front of the Presidential Office Building in Taipei. As part of the inauguration festivities, the first ever state banquet was held in Tainan.

== Inaugural speech ==
In his inaugural speech, Lai Ching-te emphasized the notion of Huadu, saying that the inauguration of the first democratically elected president Lee Teng-hui in 1996 proved to the world that "the Republic of China Taiwan is a sovereign, independent nation in which sovereignty lies in the hands of the people".

He thanked outgoing president Tsai Ing-wen, and acknowledged the significance of the Democratic Progressive Party being the first political party to win three presidential terms in a row. He stressed the need for political parties to work together, given that for the first time in 16 years, no party won an absolute majority in the Legislative Yuan. He said that the government is pledging more money to help recovery efforts for the 2024 Hualien earthquake, sent condolences to the victims, and thanked rescue workers and the international community for their support.

Ching-te emphasized Taiwan's role as a beacon of democracy. He said that Taiwan, as a democracy, outperformed autocracies in fighting the COVID-19 pandemic, and that Taiwan upheld human rights, being the first country in Asia to legalize same-sex marriage.

He said that "peace is priceless, and war has no winners", noting the ongoing Russian invasion of Ukraine and Gaza war. He thanked the US for their support in passing the Indo-Pacific Security Supplemental Appropriations Act, 2024, which gave $10 billion in military assistance to Taiwan. He said that Taiwan did not want war with China, but whilst China continued its provocations, Taiwan would be ready and willing to defend itself.

He said that Taiwan must embrace AI and use its semiconductor industry to turn Taiwan from a "silicon island" into an "AI island". He emphasized the need to have net-zero carbon emissions by 2050. He noted that Taiwan has applied to join the CPTPP, and that it would continue to forge trade partnerships with democracies around the world.

Ching-te pledged support to elderly, parents and working people and promised more government spending to increase people's happiness, including promising to promote more pedestrian friendly infrastructure and end Taiwan's reputation as a "pedestrian hell".

He emphasized the unity of the nation, saying that all citizens should come together as sovereignty of the nation resides in the people. He said that "the People's Republic of China and the Republic of China are not subordinate to each other", and that Taiwan should increase its participation in international organizations, no matter what name for the country they use.

He thanked the numerous international guests who had come to the inauguration and people who had come from overseas and made Taiwan their home. He finished by saying that citizens should work to protect Taiwan and "allow her the international respect she deserves as a great nation".

== Guests ==
Fifty-one countries sent delegates to the event. Notable guests include Santiago Peña, president of Paraguay, and Mike Pompeo, former Secretary of State of the United States. Members of the opposition Kuomintang were in attendance, such as Taipei Mayor Chiang Wan-an and Taoyuan Mayor Chang San-cheng, alongside minor party leader Ko Wen-je of the TPP. Presidents of the Judicial, Legislative, Control, and Examination Yuans also attended.

== International reactions ==
=== China ===
Cross-strait tensions increased as a result of Lai's speech. On May 23, 2024, the East Sea Fleet announced that a joint military exercise will be held in the Taiwan Strait. Soon after, China Coast Guard spokesman Gan Yu announced that Fujian province will also participate in the exercise. Additionally, China reinstated tariffs on 134 items from Taiwan previously tariff-free under the Economic Cooperation Framework Agreement.

=== United States ===
United States Secretary of State Antony Blinken praised Lai's speech. A small delegation led by US Representative Michael McCaul, composed mostly of members of the House Foreign Affairs Committee, met with Lai after the inauguration. He pledged military support for Taiwan.

== See also ==
- 2024 Taiwanese presidential election
