= Minister of Foreign Affairs (Somaliland) =

Minister of Foreign Affairs of Somaliland

Republic of Somaliland Minister of Foreign Affairs
- Wasiirka Arimaha Dibada
- Coat of arms of Somaliland
- Incumbent; Abdirahman Dahir Adam Bakal since 14 December 2024
- Ministry of Foreign Affairs and International Cooperation
- Style: The Honorable
- Member of: Cabinet of Somaliland
- Seat: Hargeisa (1991–present)
- Appointer: President of Somaliland
- Formation: 1991
- First holder: Yusuf Sheikh Ali Madar
- Deputy: Deputy Minister of Foreign Affairs of Somaliland
- Website: somalilandmfa.com

The Minister of Foreign Affairs and International Cooperation of the Republic of Somaliland (Somali: Wasiirka Arrimaha Dibadda iyo Iskaashiga Caalamiga ah ee Jamhuuriyadda Somaliland) is the government minister who heads the Ministry of Foreign Affairs and International Cooperation of the Republic of Somaliland and is a member of the Cabinet of Somaliland. The minister is responsible for overseeing the international relations of the government.

== List of Foreign Ministers ==
No.	Image	Name (Nickname)	Term start	Term end	Party
1		Yusuf Sheikh Ali Madar	1991	1993	
2		Osman Abdilahi Jama (Saylici)	1993	1995	
3		Mohamed Abdi Dhinbil (Galbeedi)	1995	1996	
4		Suleiman Mohamoud Adan (Gaal)	1997	1997	
5		Mohamoud Salah Nur (Fagadhe)	1997	2001	
6		Abdihamid Garad Jama	2001	2002	
7		Mohamed Said Mohamed (Gees)	2002	2003	
8		Edna Adan Ismail	2003	2006	United Peoples' Democratic Party
9		Abdillahi Mohamed Duale	2006	2010	United Peoples' Democratic Party
10		Mohammad Abdullahi Omar	28 July 2010	25 June 2013	Peace, Unity, and Development Party
11		Mohamed Yonis	25 June 2013	26 June 2015	Peace, Unity, and Development Party
12		Saad Ali Shire	28 October 2015	10 November 2018	Peace, Unity, and Development Party
13		Yasin Haji Mohamoud (Faratoon)	10 November 2018	3 March 2021	Peace, Unity, and Development Party
14		Essa Kayd	02 September 2021	14 December 2024	Peace, Unity, and Development Party
15		Abdirahman Dahir Adam (Bakal)	14 December 2024	Present	Waddani

== See also ==
- Foreign relations of Somaliland
- Diplomatic missions of Somaliland
- List of diplomatic missions in Somaliland
