= Mohamoud Salah Nur =

Former Foreign Minister of Somaliland

- Maxamuud Saalax Nuur
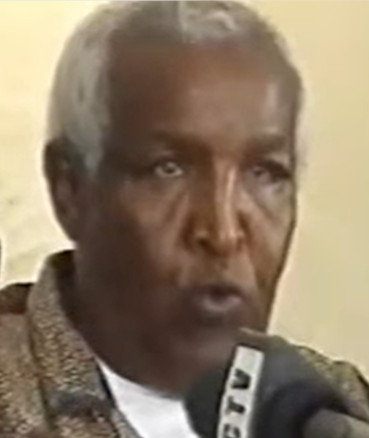

Minister of Foreign Affairs of Somaliland
- In office 1997–2001
- President: Muhammad Haji Ibrahim Egal

Personal details
- Died: 27 December 2009 France
- Occupation: Politician, diplomat
- Nickname: Fagadhe

Mohamoud Salah Nur (Somali: Maxamuud Saalax Nuur), nicknamed Fagadhe, was a former Foreign Minister of Somaliland. He also served as the country's representative in France during his later career.

== Biography ==
=== Early life and education ===
Fagadhe was born in the 1930s in the town of Jidali, located in the Sanaag region of Somaliland. He hailed from the Dhulbahante clan, specifically from the Naaleeye Axmed/Cali Naaleeye sub-clan.

At a young age, he moved to the city of Aden, where his father worked as a taxi driver in 1954. He completed his secondary education in Aden and later held several different jobs before joining labor organizations active in the city at that time. During the 1950s, he became one of the notable figures in the labor movement and participated in the nationalist activities in Aden that supported Somaliland’s independence from British colonial rule. He reportedly met several times in Aden with Muhammad Haji Ibrahim Egal, one of the leaders of the independence movement.

=== Early career ===
Fagadhe returned to Somalia in the 1960s and held various positions in the Ministry of Labour. In the 1970s, he joined the Arab Labour Organization and worked at its offices in Cairo, Baghdad, and Algiers. During the 1980s, he returned to Mogadishu, where he began to openly criticize the authoritarian rule of Siad Barre. His vocal opposition to the regime’s repressive policies led to his exclusion from holding government office.

=== Somaliland's Re-Independence ===
He was among the active politicians who participated in the Borama Conference of 1993, which laid the foundation for the modern Republic of Somaliland. Following the conference, he became a member of the first parliament established during that period. He was also known as one of the outspoken critics of the administration of Muhammad Haji Ibrahim Egal, who was elected president at the same conference.

=== Foreign Minister (1997–2001) ===
In 1997, Fagadhe was appointed Minister of Foreign Affairs of Somaliland, a position he held during the administration of Muhammad Haji Ibrahim Egal.

In March 1998, President Egal traveled to Djibouti to attend the IGAD summit. Foreign Minister Fagadhe and Finance Minister Ahmed Mohamed Mohamoud “Silanyo” had gone ahead of the delegation to make preparations. However, the Somaliland delegation was not properly received, and President Egal and his team were left waiting at their hotel, reflecting diplomatic disorganization. Gabiley News later noted that the confusion was partly due to inadequate coordination by Fagadhe and Silanyo.

In February 1999, Fagadhe accompanied President Muhammad Haji Ibrahim Egal on a visit to Yemen and held talks with Ali Abdullah Saleh and other officials.

In July 2000, he undertook an official mission to South Africa together with Abdillahi Mohamed Duale.

As Foreign Minister, Fagadhe also undertook trips to Eritrea.

During an official meeting in Rome with Italian foreign ministry officials, Fagadhe reportedly struck one of the Italian delegates after he made a disparaging remark about Somaliland, prompting President Muhammad Haji Ibrahim Egal to issue a letter of apology to the Italian deputy foreign minister.

Fagadhe served as Foreign Minister until 2001, when he retired from office due to a heart-related illness.

=== Founding of the Kulmiye Party ===
In 2001, Fagadhe co-founded the Kulmiye Party together with Ahmed Mohamed Mohamoud (Silanyo), serving as its first deputy chairman. In August 2002, the party held its first congress, at which the party leadership—including Fagadhe—was formally elected.

In May 2004, following the death of the Naaleeye Axmed/Cali Naaleeye clan chief Garaad Saleebaan, two close relatives—Saleebaan Daahir Afqarshe, supported by Somaliland, and Cabdullahi Maxamuud Guuleed, backed by Puntland—both claimed succession. Fagadhe, together with the mayor of Erigavo, endorsed Saleebaan Daahir Afqarshe.

Fagadhe resigned as deputy chairman of Kulmiye in 2007.

=== Representative of Somaliland to France ===
In 2008, President Dahir Riyale Kahin appointed him as the Representative of Somaliland to France.

=== Death ===
Shortly before his death, he expressed his wish to be buried in his homeland. Fagadhe passed away on 29 December 2009 at a hospital in Paris. His body was transported by a special aircraft to Egal International Airport in Hargeisa, where a state funeral was held. He was buried at the Boqol Jirre cemetery. The funeral was attended by President Dahir Riyale Kahin, Vice President Ahmed Yusuf Yasin, Kulmiye Party deputy chairman Muse Bihi Abdi, Kulmiye vice-presidential candidate Abdirahman Saylici.

== Family ==
As of 2015, he had a 15-year-old daughter, Amal Mohamoud Salah Nur (Fagadhe), who was living in Sweden. Amal is the daughter of his former wife, Aasha Buraale Ahmed.

== See also ==
- Foreign relations of Somaliland
- Politics of Somaliland
