= Ahmed Mohamed Gulaid =

Somali politician, first chairman of the Somali National Movement

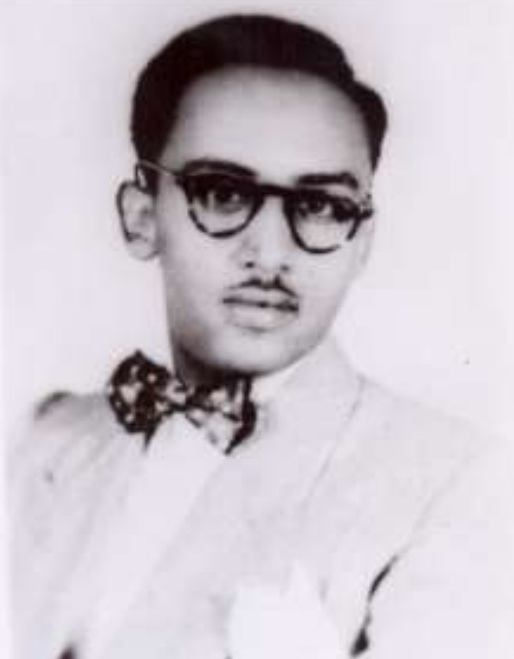
- Ahmed Mohamed Gulaid (Ahmed Jimaleh)
- Born: 16 June 1930; Aden, Aden Protectorate (present-day Aden, Yemen)
- Died: 31 December 1992 (aged 62); Cairo, Egypt
- Other name: Ahmed Jimaleh
- Occupations: Politician, journalist, businessman
- Political party: Somali National Movement (SNM)

Ahmed Mohamed Gulaid (Somali: Axmed Maxamed Guuleed; 16 June 1930 – 31 December 1992), also known as Ahmed Jimaleh, was a Somali politician, journalist, businessman, and the first chairman of the Somali National Movement (SNM).

== Early life and education ==
Ahmed Mohamed Gulaid (also known as Ahmed Jimaleh) belongs to the Sa’ad Muse sub-division of the Habr Awal clan.

Gulaid was born in Aden, Yemen, on 16 June 1930. His father, Jimaleh, had emigrated from Somaliland during the first decade of the 20th century. He completed his elementary education at Ba Zar’a Primary School and his A-levels at Crater, Aden, a British missionary school known as St. Joseph’s Secondary School that accepted only students with high grades. He later earned a two-year certificate in business management and commercial transactions. His hobbies included reading, writing, and swimming, and he particularly enjoyed listening to Umm Kulthum while reading the poetry of Omar Khayyam.

== Career in Saudi Arabia ==
After working for a British trading company in Aden, he joined the Arabian American Oil Company (ARAMCO) in Dhahran, Saudi Arabia, in 1950. Within months he became Chief Interpreter for the legal department, where American lawyers gave him the nickname “we can rough it Gulaid” for his willingness to take on difficult assignments, including work in the strict Sharia courts of Riyadh. He advocated for the rights of Somali and Yemeni workers and participated in the first labor strike at ARAMCO. Shortly afterward, labor strikes were banned in Saudi Arabia.

== Return to Somaliland ==
After returning to Hargeisa in 1956, Gulaid helped form the Somali Community League and joined the National United Front (NUF), where he became General Secretary of its central committee. The NUF later merged with the Somali National League (SNL) to form the Somali National Congress (SNC). In 1958 he co-founded the Arabic-language weekly al-Liwa (“The Banner”) with Abdillahi Omaar, serving as editor-in-chief and writing on national liberation, Pan-Africanism, and women’s education.

Gulaid also founded the Somali Trading Company and introduced modern tanning techniques for hides and skins, as well as vehicle imports from the Soviet Union. He promoted urban development and real-estate investment in Hargeisa.

== Mayor of Hargeisa ==
Municipal elections were held in March 1969, with many parties competing. Gulaid, running as a candidate of the Giideeble (Gideeble) party, won a majority of votes and became mayor of Hargeisa. His opponent, Abdullahi Oomar, was disqualified for not meeting eligibility requirements. During his seven-month term, Gulaid modernized city administration, introduced the Naaso Hablod twin-hill emblem, repaired municipal buildings, organized street cleaning, and created a municipal revenue corps. He also hosted visits by the U.S. ambassador and Somali President Abdirashid Ali Shermarke, the latter’s last visit to the north before his assassination.

== Imprisonment and writings ==
After the 1969 military coup, Gulaid was appointed Director of Planning and Research in the Ministry of Interior, but in 1972 he was arrested and convicted of “anti-revolutionary activity,” sentenced to three and a half years, and had his property confiscated. While in prison, he compiled a 30,000-word Somali–English dictionary and a 3,000-entry collection of Somali proverbs with English translations. He also wrote poetry in Arabic and Somali. Released in 1975, he remained under surveillance in Hargeisa and later escaped across the Djibouti border with the help of his brother Abdirahman.

== Exile and formation of the Somali National Movement ==
After reaching Saudi Arabia, he began organizing northern exiles opposed to the Siad Barre regime. On 6 April 1981, he participated in founding the Somali National Movement in London and was elected its first chairman that October. He worked to secure funding from the diaspora and military support from Ethiopia, establishing SNM’s radio and bases. In 1982, amid internal tensions, he resigned voluntarily to preserve unity, setting a precedent for peaceful leadership transitions within the movement.

== Later life and diplomacy ==
In exile in Canada from 1985, he founded the Association of Somali Canadians (ASCO) and served as its first president. He later became SNM’s representative to Arab countries, based in Aden, negotiating the opening of a Somaliland–Yemen commercial relations office, the resumption of air links, and a Yemeni visa waiver for Somaliland businessmen. His classmate Abdul-Karim Al-Iryani, then foreign minister of Yemen, offered him an ambassadorship in Ottawa, which he declined.

== Death and legacy ==
He died in Cairo, Egypt, on 31 December 1992, after submitting a position paper to the Secretary-General of the Arab League requesting recognition and aid for Somaliland. He was buried in Heliopolis, near Kuliyat el Banat. Gulaid was survived by his wife Roun, his children Leila, Gamal, and Samater, and several siblings. A 2016 Somaliland Sun article noted that although Gulaid is remembered as a founding father of Somaliland and a former mayor of Hargeisa, he has not yet received formal public recognition such as a monument or a medal, stating that his “Medal of Honor” remains “still up in the air.”

Preceded by None	Chairman of SNM; October 1981 – January 1982	Succeeded by Yusuf Sheikh Ali Madar
