= Abdirahman Dahir Adam =

Somaliland politician and foreign minister

Abdirahman Dahir Adam Bakal
- Cabdiraxmaan Daahir Aadan Bakaal
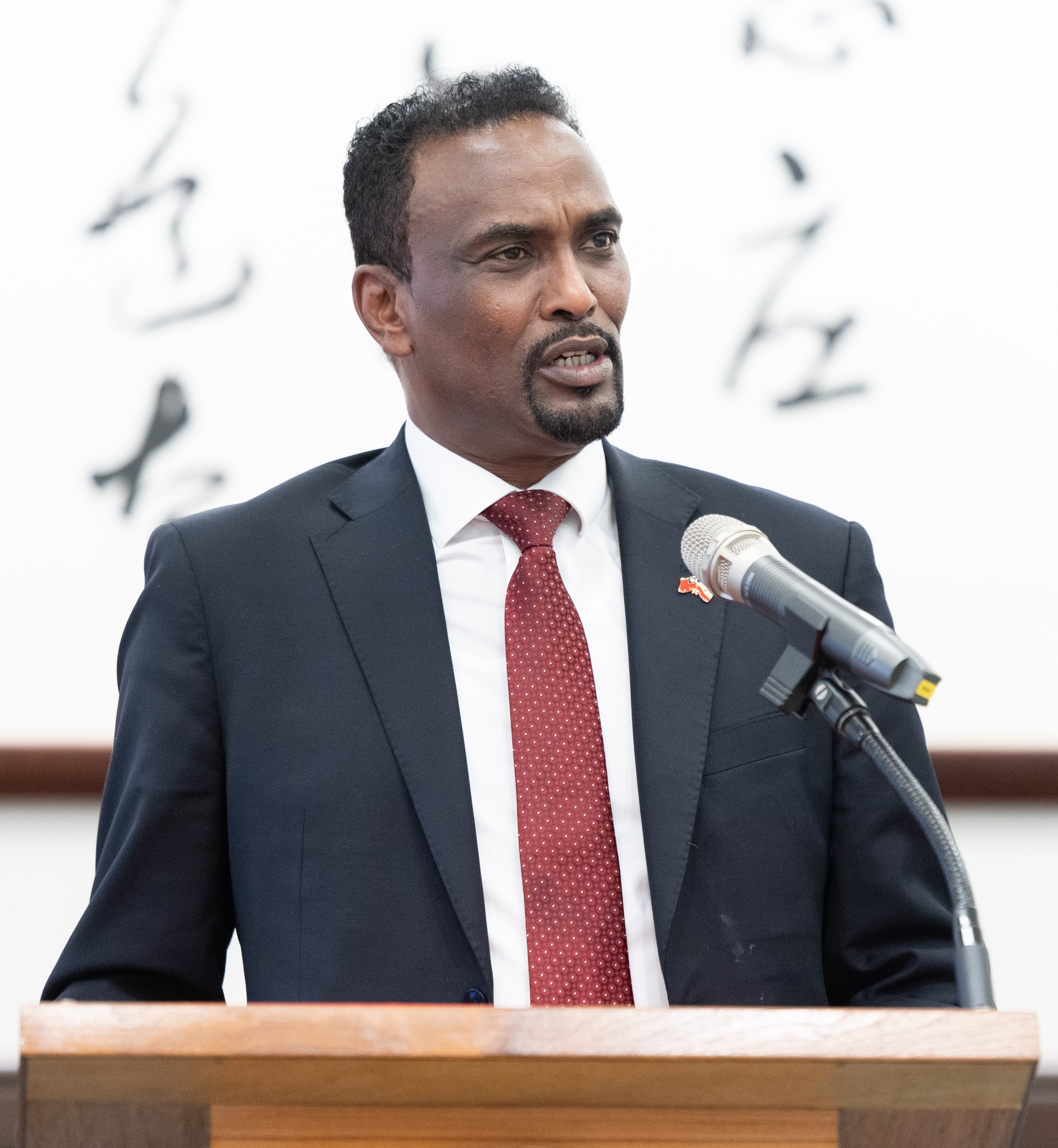

Minister of Foreign Affairs and International Cooperation of Somaliland
- Incumbent
- Assumed office 14 December 2024
- President: Muse Bihi Abdi
- Preceded by: Essa Kayd

Personal details
- Party: Waddani
- Profession: Politician

Abdirahman Dahir Adam (Somali: Cabdiraxmaan Daahir Aadan), also known as Bakal (Bakaal), is a Somaliland politician serving as the Minister of Foreign Affairs and International Cooperation of the Republic of Somaliland since December 2024.

== Biography ==
Abdirahman hails from the Gadabuursi clan, specifically the Habar Affan sub-clan.

In September 2016, Abdirahman announced his candidacy for the Waddani party's vice-presidential slot, campaigning in Gabiley, Dilla, and Borama.

=== Foreign Minister ===
On 14 December 2024, President Irro appointed Abdirahman as Minister of Foreign Affairs and International Cooperation of the Republic of Somaliland with other ministers.

In March 2025, Abdirahman declared that Somaliland would engage in dialogue only with countries that officially recognize it.

In May 2025, Abdirahman led a high-level delegation to Washington, D.C., where he met with U.S. Senator Ted Cruz and Representative Tim Burchett as part of efforts to strengthen bilateral ties and promote Somaliland's international recognition. The delegation also held discussions at the Hudson Institute.

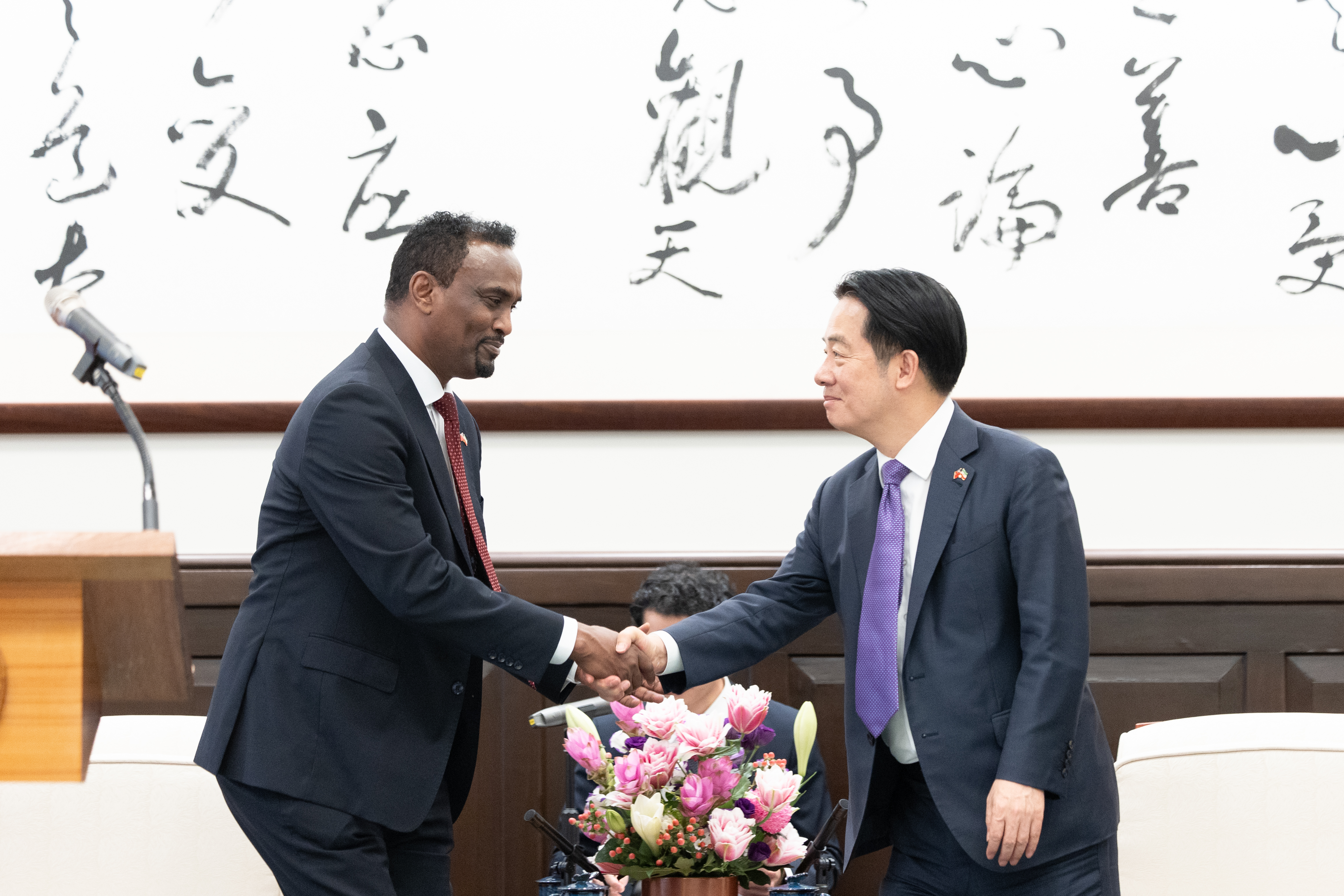
Abdirahman met with Taiwan's President William Lai

In July 2025, Abdirahman visited Taiwan as Somaliland's representative and met with President William Lai. Taiwan's Coast Guard Administration and the Somaliland Coast Guard concluded a Cooperation Agreement, with Abdirahman and Minister of the Ocean Affairs Council Kuan Bi-ling in attendance. The agreement covers visits, training, exchanges and joint maritime search-and-rescue operations. During his Taiwan visit, he underlined that our friendship continues to grow stronger each day despite external pressure.

In October 2025, a Taiwan-funded medical center worth US$22 million was set to be built in Hargeisa, and Abdirahman attended the groundbreaking ceremony.

== See also ==
- Foreign relations of Somaliland
- Somaliland–Taiwan relations
