= Mohamed Said Gees =

Somaliland politician (1946–2025)

Mohamed Said Mohamed
- Maxamed Siciid Maxamed Gees
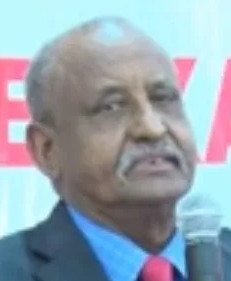

Minister of Foreign Affairs of Somaliland
- In office 2002–2003
- President: Dahir Riyale Kahin
- Preceded by: Abdihakim Garad Jama
- Succeeded by: Edna Adan Ismail

Minister of Finance of Somaliland
- In office 1999–2001
- President: Muhammad Haji Ibrahim Egal
- Preceded by: Ahmed Mohamed Mohamud (Silanyo)
- Succeeded by: Hussein Farah Dodi

Personal details
- Born: 11 November 1946 Erigavo, Somaliland
- Died: 23 August 2025 (aged 78) Virginia, United States
- Occupation: Politician, academic, peacebuilder

Mohamed Said Mohamed (11 November 1946 – 23 August 2025), commonly known by his nickname Gees (Somali: Maxamed Siciid Maxamed Gees), was a Somaliland politician, academic, and peacebuilder.

== Biography ==
=== Early Days ===
Mohamed Said Mohamed was born in Erigavo on 11 November 1946. At the age of 2, his family moved to Hargeisa, where his father worked as a medical doctor. He attended Sheikh Secondary School. He later enrolled at Lafoole (Somali National University), where he completed a degree in physics in 1973. He later pursued postgraduate studies in the United Kingdom, earning a master's degree.

=== Early career ===
After returning to Somalia, Gees began teaching physics at Lafoole University. He later joined the Ministry of Education’s curriculum development center, contributing to the introduction of Somali-language educational materials during the period when Somali became the national written language. His work involved translating science and mathematics textbooks into Somali.

=== Minister of Fisheries (Somalia) ===
In February 1990, Gees entered national politics when he was appointed Somalia's Minister of Fisheries. He reportedly learned of his appointment through a radio announcement while buying cattle in Biyo-Ado, Middle Shabelle.

=== Somali Civil War ===
Following the outbreak of the Somali Civil War and the collapse of the central government, Gees fled Mogadishu. He escaped via Kenya and Ethiopia and later lived in Yemen for a period before returning to Somaliland in the mid-1990s.

=== Minister of Planning (Somaliland) ===
Gees served as Minister of Planning of Somaliland from 1997 to 1999 under President Muhammad Haji Ibrahim Egal.

=== Minister of Finance (Somaliland) ===
From 1999 to 2001, Gees served as Minister of Finance of Somaliland. In a 2001 interview, he stated that peace and political stability were essential for economic recovery and for encouraging diaspora investment.

=== Minister of Foreign Affairs (Somaliland) ===
Gees served as Minister of Foreign Affairs of the Republic of Somaliland from 2002 to 2003 under President Dahir Riyale Kahin.

=== Work in civil society and academia ===
From 2004 to 2012, after leaving public office, Gees served as Executive Director of the Academy for Peace and Development (APD) in Hargeisa. He oversaw dialogue-based initiatives promoting peaceful elections, responsible media conduct, and the institutionalization of political parties.

=== Later work and views ===
In August 2016, Gees welcomed the Somaliland–Khatumo talks led by Ali Khalif Galaydh as a positive step, congratulated the president, and argued that progress comes through peace and dialogue—so Somaliland should engage in talks like others do.

In 2023, Gees urged Somaliland’s political leaders and citizens to reinforce democratic institutions and overcome clan-based divisions, emphasizing that national cohesion was the foundation of a stable democracy.

=== Death ===
Gees died on 23 August 2025 and was buried in Virginia, United States.

== Publications ==
- Dharaar Xusuus Leh (“A Day to Remember”) — a memoir in which Gees reflects on his life, his service in education and government, and the broader process of Somaliland’s recovery and reconstruction.
- A Self-Portrait of Somaliland: Rebuilding from the Ruins — a collaborative research document published in December 1999 by the Somaliland Centre for Peace and Development (SCPD) that notes Gees’s encouragement and advisory role in the study.
- Dharaaro Xusuustood (English Edition) — a co-authored eBook written by Said Mohamed Gees and Mohamed Said Gees, published independently through Amazon Kindle Direct Publishing in 2022 (ASIN B0BMVV56J1). Said Mohamed Gees was a Somali health official who led national smallpox and malaria control programs and was a different person from Mohamed Said Gees.
