= Abdillahi Mohamed Duale =

Somaliland politician and diplomat

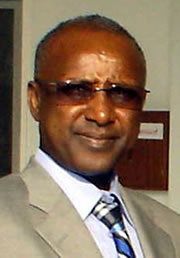

Minister of Foreign Affairs of Somaliland
- In office 2006–2010
- President: Dahir Riyale Kahin

Special Envoy of Somaliland to IGAD and African Union
- Incumbent
- Assumed office 2018

Personal details
- Occupation: Diplomat, politician

Abdillahi Mohamed Duale (Somali: Cabdullaahi Maxamed Ducaale) is a Somaliland politician and diplomat who served as the Minister of Foreign Affairs of Somaliland from 2006 to 2010 under President Dahir Riyale Kahin.

== Biography ==
Duale belongs to the Habr Je'lo (Isaaq) clan.

=== Early career ===
As of June 1993, Duale was serving as Somaliland's Minister of Planning.

As of 1993–1994, Abdillahi Mohamed Duale served as the Somaliland's Minister of Finance.

In August 1996, Duale was serving as Somaliland's Minister of Presidential Affairs.

=== Minister of Information ===
In August 2001, small-scale unrest broke out in Hargeisa after the arrest of local figures, leading to several shooting incidents on Thursday. Reports suggested that some neighborhoods had become “no-go areas.” Information Minister Abdillahi Mohamed Duale denied that the city was out of control, stating that “the situation is calm and under control,” while admitting that an incident had occurred but saying he could not yet confirm how many people had been arrested, injured, or killed.

In August 2005, as Somaliland approached its parliamentary elections, political tensions rose between the ruling and opposition parties. Information Minister Abdillahi Mohamed Duale launched stinging attacks against the opposition Kulmiye party, which local media described as contributing to the worsening political atmosphere.

=== Minister of Foreign Affairs (2006–2010) ===
In early August 2006, Somaliland underwent ministerial changes in which Abdillahi Mohamed Duale was appointed as Foreign Minister and Edna Adan Ismail left the post.

Duale was responsible for advancing Somaliland's diplomatic outreach and the international campaign for recognition.

In 2007, Duale held talks with U.S. Ambassador to Kenya Michael Ranneberger and U.S. Assistant Secretary of State for African Affairs Jendayi Frazer.

In January 2008, as part of President Dahir Riyale Kahin’s delegation, Duale paid an official visit to the United States, where the Somaliland team met senior officials from the State Department, USAID, the Department of Defense, and the National Security Council. During that visit, Subcommittee on Africa and Global Health chair Donald M. Payne refused to meet the Somaliland delegation.

In June 2009, U.S. Representative Donald M. Payne invited the Somaliland government to testify before the House Subcommittee on Africa and Global Health. Somaliland Foreign Minister Duale initially accepted the invitation, but later withdrew because the hearing—titled “Somalia: Prospects for Lasting Peace and a Unified Response to Extremism and Terrorism”—also included Transitional Federal Government Foreign Minister Mohamed Omaar and Puntland President Dr. Abdirahman Mohamed Mohamud. Duale requested a separate hearing for Somaliland, but the request was denied.

In April 2009, Duale represented Somaliland internationally at the “State of Sovereignty” conference organized by Durham University's International Boundaries Research Unit.

In June 2010, Duale publicly criticized the militia SSC and its chairman Suleiman Haglotosiye, describing them as terrorists.

=== Later roles ===
Since 2018, Duale has served as Somaliland's Special Envoy to the Intergovernmental Authority on Development (IGAD) and the African Union.

As of December 2024, he was serving as Somaliland's Special Envoy to the African Union (AU) and the Intergovernmental Authority on Development (IGAD).

== Reputation ==
Duale is described as a “respected diplomat and politician in the greater Horn of Africa.” He is noted for emphasizing integrity in public service and for avoiding association with foreign-funded religious movements.
