= Opinion polling for the 2024 Taiwanese presidential election =

This is a list of nationwide public opinion polls that have been conducted relating to the 2024 Taiwanese presidential election. The persons named in the polls are declared candidates or have received media speculation about their possible candidacy. Rating figures are in percentages.

== Graphical summary ==
Local regression of polls conducted since 2023

== Opinion poll data ==
=== After candidate registrations ===
Pollster	Fieldwork date	Sample size	Lai-Hsiao DPP	Hou-Jaw KMT	Ko-Wu TPP	Others Undecided	Lead
3 January 2024			Publication of election polls prohibited until after the election.				
ETtoday	31 December 2023–1 January 2024	1,557	38.9%	35.8%	22.4%	2.8%	3.1%
Mirror Media	30–31 December 2023	1,099	35.6%	24.1%	24.2%	16.2%	11.4%
ETtoday	30–31 December 2023	1,295	35.4%	33.4%	22.1%	3.1%	2%
TVBS	30 December 2023	1,407	33%	30%	24%	13%	3%
udn	26–30 December 2023	1,215	32%	27%	21%	20%	5%
FTNN	26–29 December 2023	1,200	35.8%	27.3%	22.1%	14.8%	8.5%
QuickseeK	26–29 December 2023	1,285	33.7%	23.7%	27.7%	14.8%	10%
RW News	25–29 December 2023	12,409	36.89%	32.83%	28.64%	1.63%	4.06%
ETtoday	27–28 December 2023	1,740	36.6%	33.8%	22.2%	7.4%	2.8%
TVBS	22–28 December 2023	1,074	37%	33%	22%	9%	4%
SETN	26–27 December 2023	1,095	30.9%	27.9%	23.8%	17.5%	3%
ETtoday	25–26 December 2023	1,618	38.1%	34.8%	19.2%	7.8%	3.3%
Mirror Media	24–25 December 2023	1,081	33.3%	26.5%	23.2%	17.0%	6.8%
CMMedia	23–25 December 2023	1,066	29.5%	22.7%	27.8%	20.1%	1.7%
TPOF	22–24 December 2023	1,076	32.4%	28.2%	24.6%	14.8%	4.2%
Formosa^{[usurped]}	20–21 December 2023	1,070	38.2%	33.9%	16.1%	11.7%	4.3%
ETtoday	20–21 December 2023	1,217	36.2%	34.8%	20.7%	8.2%	1.4%
TVBS	15–21 December 2023	1,840	33%	32%	24%	11%	1%
QuickseeK	17–20 December 2023	1,288	32.5%	27.2%	26.7%	13.6%	5.3%
udn	13–17 December 2023	1,250	31%	31%	21%	17%	Tie
Z.Media	15–16 December 2023	1,213	31.4%	29.6%	20.5%	18.5%	1.8%
ETtoday	14–15 December 2023	1,300	38.5%	35.1%	19.6%	6.8%	3.4%
SETN	11–12 December 2023	1,000	34.7%	28.8%	21.2%	15.3%	5.9%
TVBS	5–12 December 2023	1,632	36%	32%	22%	9%	4%
Mirror Media	10–11 December 2023	1,075	33.5%	25.2%	23.7%	17.5%	8.3%
Formosa^{[usurped]}	27–28 November 2023	1,076	36.6%	30.5%	17.7%	15.3%	6.1%
RW News	24–28 November 2023	12,041	41.12%	31.05%	25.31%	2.52%	10.07%
TVBS	24–26 November 2023	1,744	34%	31%	23%	12%	3%
udn	24–26 November 2023	1,238	31%	29%	21%	20%	2%
ETtoday	24 November 2023	1,348	34.8%	32.5%	21.2%	11.6%	2.3%

=== Before candidate registrations ===
Pollster	Fieldwork date	Sample size	Lai DPP	Hou KMT	Ko TPP	Gou IND.	Others Undecided	Lead
24 November 2023			Terry Gou withdraws his candidacy.					
Formosa^{[usurped]}	24–25 October 2023	1,070	32.5%	21.9%	20.4%	5.3%	19.9%	10.6%
Formosa^{[usurped]}	24–25 October 2023	1,070	33.7%	24.6%	23.9%	—	17.8%	9.1%
TVBS	18–24 October 2023	1,447	33%	22%	24%	8%	14%	11%
TVBS	18–24 October 2023	1,447	34%	26%	29%	—	10%	5%
TPOF	15–17 October 2023	1,080	26.5%	20.2%	21.7%	12.4%	19.1%	6.3%
TPOF	15–17 October 2023	1,080	29.7%	21.1%	25.6%	—	23.6%	4.1%
Mirror Media	14–16 October 2023	1,072	32.3%	17.8%	23.2%	9.2%	17.4%	9.1%
Mirror Media	14–16 October 2023	1,072	32.1%	18.7%	24.8%	—	24.4%	7.3%
SETN	1–3 October 2023	1,000	30.9%	17.8%	24.2%	11.6%	15.5%	6.7%
SETN	1–3 October 2023	1,000	32.2%	20.0%	26.8%	—	21.1%	5.4%
TVBS	22–26 September 2023	1,127	34%	21%	22%	9%	14%	12%
TVBS	22–26 September 2023	1,127	36%	26%	28%	—	11%	9%
Mirror Media	23–24 September 2023	1,096	34.5%	16.5%	24.1%	8.5%	16.3%	10.4%
Mirror Media	23–24 September 2023	1,096	33.3%	16.4%	28.0%	—	22.3%	5.3%
FTNN	19–24 September 2023	2,402	34.3%	16.3%	18.6%	9.1%	21.7%	12.6%
FTNN	19–24 September 2023	2,402	34.9%	16.8%	20.8%	—	27.5%	7.4%
CMMedia	18–22 September 2023	1,213	27.9%	12.6%	22.4%	12.5%	24.6%	3.3%
Formosa^{[usurped]}	20–21 September 2023	1,072	37.3%	19.7%	16.9%	7.4%	18.7%	17.6%
Formosa^{[usurped]}	20–21 September 2023	1,072	40.0%	22.4%	21.6%	—	15.9%	17.6%
TPOF	18–20 September 2023	1,077	31.4%	15.7%	23.1%	10.5%	19.4%	8.3%
TPOF	18–20 September 2023	1,077	33.4%	17.2%	27.4%	—	22.1%	6%
TVBS	28 August – 1 September 2023	1,273	30%	19%	23%	14%	13%	7%
28 August 2023			Terry Gou declares his candidacy.					
Mirror Media	27–28 August 2023	1,083	33.4%	15.3%	22.7%	12.9%	15.7%	10.7%
Mirror Media	27–28 August 2023	1,083	34.3%	16.2%	27.1%	—	22.4%	7.2%
Formosa^{[usurped]}	23–24 August 2023	1,070	40.1%	15.6%	16.6%	12.0%	15.8%	23.5%
Formosa^{[usurped]}	23–24 August 2023	1,070	42.5%	17.0%	21.1%	—	19.3%	21.4%
TVBS	21–24 August 2023	1,171	37%	22%	28%	—	13%	9%
QuickseeK	17–21 August 2023	1,222	35.6%	16.2%	24.4%	12.4%	11.4%	11.2%
QuickseeK	17–21 August 2023	1,222	35.8%	17.9%	29.6%	—	16.6%	6.2%
TPOF	14–15 August 2023	1,081	43.4%	13.6%	26.6%	—	16.3%	16.8%
FTNN	9–13 August 2023	2,402	31.2%	14.8%	19.5%	11.8%	22.7%	8.5%
FTNN	9–13 August 2023	2,402	33.4%	15.9%	23.2%	—	27.4%	6%
TVBS	24–26 July 2023	1,618	33%	25%	32%	—	10%	1%
Formosa^{[usurped]}	24–25 July 2023	1,071	33.1%	17.3%	20.7%	12.8%	16.1%	12.4%
Formosa^{[usurped]}	24–25 July 2023	1,071	35.1%	19.9%	24.0%	—	20.4%	11.1%
Formosa^{[usurped]}	24–25 July 2023	1,071	33.8%	17.4%	—	30.7%	18.1%	3.1%
TPOF	17–18 July 2023	1,088	36.4%	20.2%	27.8%	—	15.7%	8.6%
TPOF	17–18 July 2023	1,088	33.9%	18.0%	20.5%	15.2%	12.4%	13.4%
FTNN	11–16 July 2023	2,409	28.0%	12.4%	20.4%	14.4%	24.8%	3.2%
FTNN	11–16 July 2023	2,409	30.2%	15.3%	25.4%	—	29.1%	1.1%
QuickseeK	7–10 July 2023	1,178	34.8%	19.3%	30.8%	—	15.0%	4%
QuickseeK	7–10 July 2023	1,178	32.8%	—	27.7%	24.5%	15.0%	5.1%
QuickseeK	7–10 July 2023	1,178	33.8%	17.0%	—	35.6%	13.6%	1.8%
Z.Media	1–2 July 2023	1,079	29.8%	15.2%	24.4%	14.0%	16.2%	5.4%
Z.Media	1–2 July 2023	1,079	32.0%	16.3%	—	35.8%	15.5%	3.8%
Z.Media	1–2 July 2023	1,079	29.9%	16.0%	29.8%	—	23.8%	0.1%
NCPF	30 June – 2 July 2023	1,075	31%	15%	19%	15%	20%	11%
NCPF	30 June – 2 July 2023	1,075	34%	17%	25%	—	24%	9%
CNEWS	28 June – 1 July 2023	1,816	29.3%	18.5%	30.8%	—	21.4%	1.5%
Formosa^{[usurped]}	28–29 June 2023	1,070	33.3%	15.6%	20.9%	15.4%	14.8%	12.4%
Formosa^{[usurped]}	28–29 June 2023	1,070	35.9%	17.1%	28.6%	—	18.4%	7.3%
BCC-Gallup	16–20 June 2023	1,083	31.89%	17.93%	24.62%	—	21.97%	7.28%
TVBS	14–16 June 2023	1,080	30%	23%	33%	—	14%	3%
TPOF	12–13 June 2023	1,080	36.5%	20.4%	29.1%	—	14.0%	7.4%
CNEWS	31 May – 1 June 2023	1,077	35.7%	25.9%	24.9%	—	13.5%	9.8%
Formosa^{[usurped]}	29–30 May 2023	1,072	35.4%	22.6%	25.5%	—	16.5%	9.9%
Formosa^{[usurped]}	24–25 May 2023	1,072	35.8%	18.3%	25.9%	—	20%	9.9%
NCPF	22–24 May 2023	1,082	34%	23%	23%	—	20%	11%
Fount Media	22–23 May 2023	1,074	26.6%	24.7%	21.1%	—	27.6%	1.9%
SETN	17–18 May 2023	1,080	29.8%	29.2%	20.8%	—	20.2%	0.6%
TVBS	17–18 May 2023	1,444	27%	30%	23%	—	20%	3%

=== Issue polling ===
Pollster	Fieldwork date	Sample problem	Sample size	Lai DPP	Hou KMT	Ko TPP	Gou IND.	Others Undecided	Lead
ETtoday	10–16 October 2023	Member mobile SMS backfill	1,582	34.7%	27.4%	25.5%	—	12.3%	7.3%
RW News	10–14 October 2023	Online questionnaire backfill	11,055	42.62%	22.29%	24.93%	5.86%	4.30%	17.69%
RW News	10–14 October 2023	Online questionnaire backfill	11,055	42.85%	22.87%	26.09%	—	8.20%	16.76%
udn	22–25 September 2023	No raw data	1,082	30%	20%	21%	—	30%	Tie
ETtoday	23–24 September 2023	Member mobile SMS backfill	1,368	32.0%	24.5%	20.7%	13.2%	9.6%	7.4%
RW News	12–16 September 2023	Online questionnaire backfill	10,846	42.52%	22.25%	24.23%	6.58%	4.41%	18.29%
KPoint Survey & Research	12–14 September 2023	No raw data	1,073	29.4%	18.4%	16.7%	14.0%	21.5%	7.9%
KPoint Survey & Research	12–14 September 2023	No raw data	1,073	29.2%	21.5%	19.6%	—	29.7%	0.5%
ETtoday	8–9 September 2023	Member mobile SMS backfill	1,337	35.1%	24.8%	20.0%	12.9%	7.2%	10.3%
ETtoday	8–9 September 2023	Member mobile SMS backfill	1,337	36.5%	29.5%	22.9%	—	11.0%	7%
ETtoday	29–30 August 2023	Member mobile SMS backfill	1,495	35.3%	21.4%	17.6%	17.2%	8.4%	13.9%
ETtoday	18–20 August 2023	Member mobile SMS backfill	1,207	35.4%	25.6%	24.2%	—	14.9%	9.8%
RW News	15–19 August 2023	Online questionnaire backfill	11,324	40.56%	22.16%	23.13%	8.96%	5.18%	17.43%
RW News	15–19 August 2023	Online questionnaire backfill	11,324	40.99%	22.79%	25.80%	—	10.12%	15.19%
ETtoday	15–17 August 2023	Member mobile SMS backfill	1,235	31.7%	18.6%	17.5%	10.2%	22.0%	9.7%
KPoint Survey & Research	31 July – 2 August 2023	No raw data	1,075	30.3%	15.1%	18.2%	14.8%	21.6%	8.7%
KPoint Survey & Research	31 July – 2 August 2023	No raw data	1,075	32.3%	15.8%	23.1%	—	28.8%	3.5%
Newtalk	31 July – 1 August 2023	Member mobile SMS backfill	1,402	30.46%	16.92%	24.71%	17.34%	10.58%	5.75%
Newtalk	31 July – 1 August 2023	Member mobile SMS backfill	1,402	29.46%	—	26.23%	26.31%	18.0%	3.15%
Newtalk	31 July – 1 August 2023	Member mobile SMS backfill	1,402	33.5%	21.4%	29.57%	—	15.53%	3.93%
ETtoday	28–30 July 2023	Member mobile SMS backfill	1,753	33.4%	21.0%	21.6%	16.4%	7.7%	11.8%
ETtoday	28–30 July 2023	Member mobile SMS backfill	1,753	35.6%	24.3%	28.8%	—	11.3%	6.8%
TISR	19–20 July 2023	No raw data	1,068	29.0%	13.2%	17.7%	10.7%	4.0%	11.3%
TISR	19–20 July 2023	No raw data	1,068	33.8%	15.6%	24.9%	—	6.0%	8.9%
RW News	12–16 July 2023	Online questionnaire backfill	12,464	38.23%	20.39%	25.29%	9.22%	6.87%	12.94%
RW News	12–16 July 2023	Online questionnaire backfill	12,464	38.48%	21.29%	28.34%	—	11.89%	10.14%
ACEL	10–12 July 2023	No raw data	1,003	33.6%	14.8%	21.1%	12.5%	18.0%	15.6%
ACEL	10–12 July 2023	No raw data	1,003	32.4%	17.6%	25.9%	—	24.1%	6.5%
ERA NEWS	3–6 July 2023	No raw data	1,070	34.9%	14.5%	19.2%	14.6%	16.8%	15.7%
ERA NEWS	3–6 July 2023	No raw data	1,070	35.5%	17.2%	24.2%	—	23.1%	11.3%
Newtalk	30 June – 1 July 2023	Member mobile SMS backfill	3,245	28.26%	14.63%	21.94%	22.29%	12.89%	5.97%
Newtalk	30 June – 1 July 2023	Member mobile SMS backfill	3,245	28.49%	—	24.07%	28.77%	18.67%	0.28%
Newtalk	30 June – 1 July 2023	Member mobile SMS backfill	1,070	32.77%	21.31%	30.74%	—	15.19%	2.03%
RW News	6–10 June 2023	Online questionnaire backfill	12,030	37.8%	21.9%	31.3%	—	9.1%	6.5%
KPoint Survey & Research	6–9 June 2023	No raw data	1,076	31.2%	17.9%	21.5%	—	29.4%	1.8%
ETtoday	23–25 May 2023	Member mobile SMS backfill	1,223	36.4%	27.7%	23.1%	—	12.8%	8.7%
udn	18–21 May 2023	No raw data	1,090	28%	24%	22%	—	27%	1%

=== Formosa daily poll ===
Number	Fieldwork date	Sample size	Lai-Hsiao DPP	Hou-Jaw KMT	Ko-Wu TPP	Others Undecided	Lead
101^{[usurped]}	27–29 December 2023	1,253	39.6%	28.5%	18.9%	13.0%	11.1%
100^{[usurped]}	26–28 December 2023	1,326	40.2%	28.7%	18.4%	12.8%	11.5%
99^{[usurped]}	25–27 December 2023	1,201	40.0%	28.9%	17.6%	13.5%	11.1%
98^{[usurped]}	22, 25–26 December 2023	1,201	38.7%	29.7%	16.6%	15.0%	9%
97^{[usurped]}	21–22, 25 December 2023	1,349	38.9%	29.4%	17.2%	14.4%	9.5%
96^{[usurped]}	20–22 December 2023	1,470	37.5%	32.6%	16.3%	13.6%	4.9%
95^{[usurped]}	19–21 December 2023	1,470	37.3%	33.4%	17.7%	11.6%	3.9%
94^{[usurped]}	18–20 December 2023	1,322	36.3%	32.8%	17.7%	13.6%	3.5%
93^{[usurped]}	15, 18–19 December 2023	1,201	35.2%	30.6%	19.6%	14.6%	4.6%
92^{[usurped]}	14–15, 18 December 2023	1,201	35.0%	31.7%	18.2%	15.1%	3.3%
91^{[usurped]}	13–15 December 2023	1,201	35.2%	32.1%	19.7%	13.0%	3.1%
90^{[usurped]}	12–14 December 2023	1,201	35.7%	31.7%	18.6%	14.0%	4%
89^{[usurped]}	11–13 December 2023	1,201	35.2%	29.5%	19.0%	16.3%	5.7%
88^{[usurped]}	8, 11–12 December 2023	1,201	34.7%	31.2%	16.8%	17.3%	3.5%
87^{[usurped]}	7–8, 11 December 2023	1,201	35.1%	32.5%	17.0%	15.4%	2.6%
86^{[usurped]}	6–8 December 2023	1,201	37.8%	32.6%	17.3%	12.3%	5.6%
85^{[usurped]}	5–7 December 2023	1,201	40.5%	30.8%	16.3%	12.5%	9.7%
84^{[usurped]}	4–6 December 2023	1,201	40.1%	31.6%	14.8%	15.5%	8.5%
83^{[usurped]}	1, 4–5 December 2023	1,201	38.3%	31.4%	14.8%	15.4%	6.9%
82^{[usurped]}	30 November–1, 4 December 2023	1,201	38.0%	31.7%	14.9%	15.4%	6.3%
81^{[usurped]}	29 November–1 December 2023	1,201	37.8%	29.5%	17.7%	15.0%	8.3%
80^{[usurped]}	28–30 November 2023	1,348	37.1%	30.5%	17.5%	14.9%	6.6%
78^{[usurped]}	24, 27–28 November 2023	1,476	36.3%	31.0%	18.0%	14.7%	5.3%

=== CNEWS weekly poll ===
Sample Week	Fieldwork date	Sample method	Sample size	Lai DPP	Hou KMT	Ko TPP	Gou IND.	Others Undecided	Lead
1st week of December	30 November – 1 December 2023	local phone + mobile phone	2,008	36.9%	28.0%	26.0%	—	9.1%	8.9%
1st week of December	30 November – 1 December 2023	local phone	1,000	37.1%	32.9%	17.4%	—	12.6%	4.2%
4th week of November	24 – 25 November 2023	local phone + mobile phone	2,013	36.8%	26.6%	26.8%	—	9.8%	10%
4th week of November	24 – 25 November 2023	local phone	1,000	39.9%	29.7%	18.9%	—	11.5%	10.2%
24 November 2023			Terry Gou withdraws his candidacy.						
2nd week of November	10 – 11 November 2023	local phone + mobile phone	2,046	30.8%	18.0%	26.0%	9.3%	15.9%	4.8%
2nd week of November	10 – 11 November 2023	local phone	1,033	33.9%	22.2%	22.4%	7.3%	14.2%	11.5%
1st week of November	4 – 5 November 2023	local phone + mobile phone	2,000	32.7%	17.3%	25.8%	10.0%	14.2%	6.9%
1st week of November	4 – 5 November 2023	local phone	1,000	34.7%	20.9%	19.7%	9.9%	14.8%	13.8%
5th week of October	29 – 30 October 2023	local phone + mobile phone	2,049	25.6%	16.0%	25.4%	13.3%	19.7%	0.2%
5th week of October	29 – 30 October 2023	local phone	1,012	29.1%	18.2%	20.4%	10.8%	21.5%	8.7%
4th week of October	21 – 22 October 2023	local phone + mobile phone	2,048	24.0%	16.2%	24.7%	15.8%	19.3%	0.7%
4th week of October	21 – 22 October 2023	local phone	1,034	27.6%	19.1%	19.7%	14.1%	19.5%	7.9%
3rd week of October	13 – 14 October 2023	local phone + mobile phone	2,062	29.7%	16.2%	27.7%	11.7%	14.7%	2%
3rd week of October	13 – 14 October 2023	local phone	1,051	34.8%	19.6%	20.4%	8.9%	16.3%	14.4%
2nd week of October	7 – 8 October 2023	local phone + mobile phone	2,045	31.6%	17.0%	26.7%	11.2%	13.5%	4.9%
2nd week of October	7 – 8 October 2023	local phone	1,030	36.0%	17.8%	20.4%	9.1%	16.7%	15.6%
1st week of October	29 – 30 September 2023	local phone + mobile phone	2,037	28.6%	16.9%	24.3%	12.3%	17.9%	4.3%
1st week of October	29 – 30 September 2023	local phone	1,030	31.5%	17.8%	19.8%	10.2%	20.7%	10.8%
4th week of September	23 – 24 September 2023	local phone + mobile phone	2,016	27.3%	14.2%	23.7%	14.2%	20.6%	3.6%
4th week of September	23 – 24 September 2023	local phone	1,013	32.6%	14.8%	18.9%	12.3%	20.4%	12.2%
3rd week of September	15 – 16 September 2023	local phone + mobile phone	2,052	28.0%	16.3%	22.6%	13.7%	19.4%	5.4%
3rd week of September	15 – 16 September 2023	local phone	1,025	29.7%	20.8%	16.7%	14.1%	18.7%	8.9%
2nd week of September	9 – 10 September 2023	local phone + mobile phone	2,145	28.4%	15.6%	23.4%	13.0%	19.6%	5%
2nd week of September	9 – 10 September 2023	local phone	1,127	31.5%	16.1%	18.9%	10.6%	22.9%	8.6%
1st week of September	1 – 2 September 2023	local phone + mobile phone	2,024	29.7%	14.8%	23.4%	12.6%	19.5%	6.3%
1st week of September	1 – 2 September 2023	local phone	1,008	35.4%	15.1%	16.7%	10.7%	22.1%	13.3%
Note：: Taiwan CNEWS believes that the different survey methods of each media have led to huge differences in results, and decided to continue to publish presidential election polls starting in September 2023.; The survey method is 50% local phone and 50% mobile phone. The number of samples is more than 2,000. In addition, more than 1,000 local phone survey results are simultaneously calculated.
