= Essa Kayd =

Somali politician

Dr. Essa Kayd
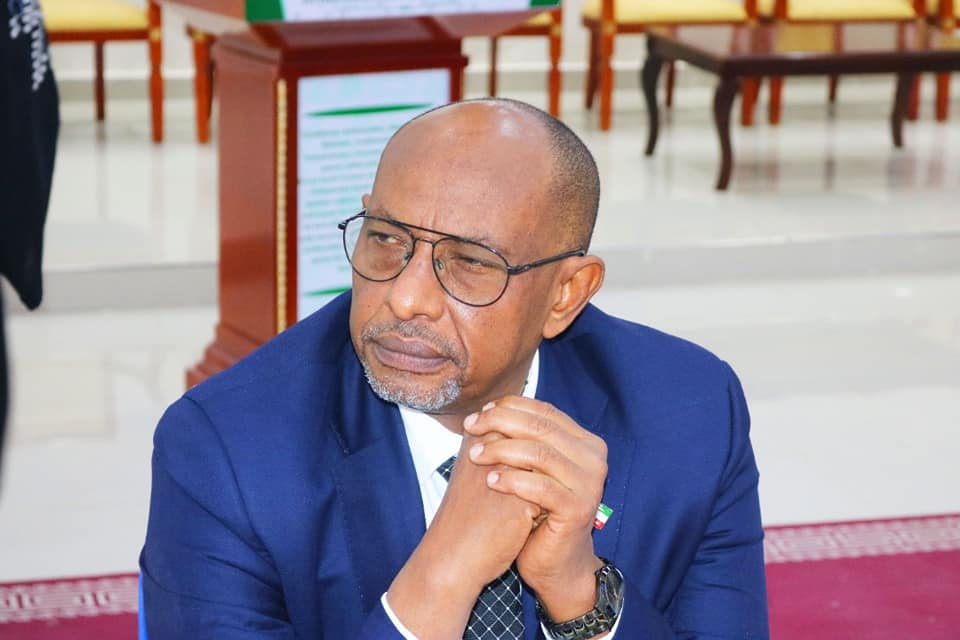

Minister of Foreign Affairs
- In office 2 September 2021 – 14 December 2024
- President: Muse Bihi Abdi; Abdirahman Mohamed Abdullahi
- Preceded by: Yasin Haji Mohamoud
- Succeeded by: Abdirahman Dahir Adam Bakal

Personal details
- Citizenship: Somalilander
- Party: Peace, Unity, and Development Party

Dr. Essa Abdirahman Mohamoud Kayd (Somali: Ciise Cabdiraxmaan Keyd; Arabic: عيسى كيد) is a Somaliland politician who served as Somaliland's Minister of Foreign Affairs.

== Biography ==
=== Early life ===
Kayd was born in around 1960 in Hargeisa. He is from the Samane Abdale sub-clan of the Arap/Isaaq.

After spending his teenage years in Djibouti, he studied at Université de la Timone in Marseille with a Master of Neuroscience. Soon after, he moved to Ottawa, Canada where he worked with the Ottawa Civic Hospital's Institute of Neuroscience from 1990-1999 as a Neurodiagnostic Specialist.

=== Career ===
In the early 2000s he moved to Boston, United States, where he worked as the Chief of the Neurophysiology Department at Brigham and Women's Hospital. Having acquired many years of experience, he started to also work with Harvard Medical School Teaching Hospital, where he was responsible for training Harvard residents and fellow Doctors in Neurophysiology.

In 2009, Kayd temporarily returned to Somaliland to help treat his aunt, but at the time, the necessary surgery could only be performed in Ethiopia. He also had a nephew who needed treatment in neurology, but that treatment could only be done in Ethiopia. He learned there were other neurological patients in Somaliland and established a neurology clinic within Edna Aden Hospital, an obstetrics facility. This clinic became independent as the Hargeisa Neurological Center and expanded to employ 29 staff members by 2013, including nurses, technicians, clinical laboratory scientists, physical therapy assistants, and local doctors.

In 2013, Kayd moved to Somaliland.

In January 2014, Kayd joined a visiting Harvard University medical team and met with Somaliland’s Vice-President. At the time, he was described as co-owner of the Hargeisa Neurological Center, and as the Chief Neurodiagnostic Specialist at Brigham and Women's Hospital in Boston, United States.

=== Foreign minister ===
In February 2021, Kayd ran for a seat in the Somaliland House of Representatives as one of the representatives of the Samane Abdale clan.

In September 2021, Kayd was appointed Minister of Foreign Affairs.

In November 2021, Kayd led a six-day official visit to the United States, during which he traveled to Washington, D.C. and New York City. During the visit, he and members of his delegation held meetings with officials from the U.S. National Security Council, the Department of State, the Department of Defense, and USAID, as well as members and senior staff of the U.S. Senate and House foreign affairs committees. Kayd also engaged with policy institutes, academic institutions, and representatives of the Somaliland diaspora, and discussed regional security issues, counter-terrorism, and prospects for enhanced cooperation between Somaliland and the United States, highlighting challenges faced by Somaliland as an unrecognized state, including access to COVID-19 vaccines.

In January 2022, Kayd led a diplomatic delegation to visit Djibouti and held talks with the President.

In September 2022, Kayd visited Taiwan and met with President Tsai Ing-wen. Commenting on the visit, Kayd said that it demonstrated the mutual determination of both sides to expand further and deepen friendship and cooperation.

In October 2022, Kayd attended the Conservative Party Conference in Birmingham, United Kingdom, where he and the Somaliland Mission team welcomed visitors to a booth aimed at educating them about the Republic of Somaliland’s history and vision for the future.

In April 2023, Issa Kayd was reported to be receiving medical treatment in Boston, the United States.

In January 2024, Somaliland and Ethiopia signed a Memorandum of Understanding (MoU) for Somaliland to lease its coastline to Ethiopia. In response to criticism from Somalia and many other countries, the Kayd party issued a press release explaining the purpose and legitimacy of this MoU. Kayd announced in September that the agreement was “close to being finalized.” However, Ethiopia announced its withdrawal in December, and the agreement was not concluded.

On 14 December 2024, Abdirahman Dahir Adam (Bakal) was appointed Somaliland’s Minister of Foreign Affairs. For a period during the transition, outgoing Foreign Minister Kayd continued to act in a caretaker capacity for Somaliland’s Foreign Ministry.

== Family ==
Kayd is fluent in French, English and Somali and has 9 children.
