= Yusuf Sheikh Ali Madar =

Somali politician and former chairman of the Somali National Movement

- Yuusuf Sheekh Cali Sheekh Madar

Minister of Foreign Affairs of Somaliland
- In office May 1991 – May 1993
- President: Abdirahman Ahmed Ali Tuur
- Preceded by: Office established

Chairman of the Somali National Movement
- In office January 1982 – November 1983
- Preceded by: Ahmed Mohamed Gulaid
- Succeeded by: Abdiqadir Kosar Abdi

Yusuf Sheikh Ali Madar (Somali: Yuusuf Sheekh Cali Sheekh Madar) was a Somali politician who served as the second chairman of the Somali National Movement (SNM) and later as the first Minister of Foreign Affairs of Somaliland.

== Career ==
Yusuf was the grandson of Sheikh Madar, a prominent religious leader known as the founder of Hargeisa. He was from the Habr Awal branch of the Isaaq clan.

=== Chairman of the Somali National Movement ===
Yusuf became the second chairman of the Somali National Movement in January 1982, succeeding Ahmed Mohamed Gulaid. Yusuf led its religious wing and introduced Islamic principles, making the Sharia its moral foundation. His policies created tension with secular members.

In November 1983, following an emergency meeting of the SNM central committee in Jijiga, Yusuf and several members of the Saudi-based religious faction were replaced by professional army officers who had defected from the Somali Armed Forces to Ethiopia and joined the SNM. Colonel Abdiqadir Kosar Abdi became chairman, Adan Shinneh Mohamed vice-chairman, and Mohamed Kahin Ahmed secretary.

=== Minister of Foreign Affairs of Somaliland ===
When Somaliland declared independence from Somalia in May 1991, President Abdirahman Ahmed Ali Tuur appointed Yusuf as the country's first foreign minister. Contemporary accounts describe him as a former SNM chairman who was tasked with building the foreign relations of the newly proclaimed Republic of Somaliland.

Yusuf was appointed foreign minister because the new administration sought to communicate Somaliland's declaration of independence to the international community, and his background as a former SNM chairman made him a suitable figure for diplomatic outreach. After his appointment, Yusuf led a government delegation to Europe and North America to explain Somaliland's position. In New York, he worked with the diaspora to commission two international law experts in Washington, D.C., who prepared a legal memorandum titled “The Case for the Independent Statehood of Somaliland.” His tenure is referenced in later analyses of Somaliland's early diplomatic initiatives and the development of its unrecognized foreign service.

In May 1993, following the Borama Conference that concluded the transitional administration of President Abdirahman Ahmed Ali Tuur, Yusuf stepped down from his position as foreign minister along with the rest of the cabinet.

Political offices
Preceded by Ahmed Mohamed Gulaid	Chairman of the Somali National Movement; 1982–1983	Succeeded by Abdiqadir Kosar Abdi
