= Mohamed Abdi Dhinbil =

Somaliland politician, lecturer, and humanitarian worker

Mohamed Abdi Dhinbil (Somali: Maxamad Cabdi Dhinbiil, Arabic: محمد عبدي دنبيل) (October 1948–September 2000), also known as Galbeedi, was a Somaliland politician, lecturer, and a humanitarian worker born in Kalabaydh district, Somaliland. He held ministerial posts at the Ministry of Foreign Affairs, the Ministry of National Planning and Coordination, the Ministry of Finance, Sool Deputy Governor, and the Ministry of Post and Telecommunication.
