= Arab–Israeli relations =

Relations between Israel and the Arab world

The dynamic between the Arab world and the State of Israel has largely been marked by overt hostility, owing to the latter's conflict with the Palestinian Arabs. Israel has fought several wars with many Arab countries, and most members of the Arab League do not recognize Israeli sovereignty. Although social and political strife continues to dominate the general atmosphere between the two sides, no Arab country has engaged in a direct military conflict with Israel since the 1973 Arab–Israeli War. Israel has since made peace with a number of Arab countries, beginning with Egypt in 1979, Palestine in 1993, and Jordan in 1994. In 2020, four Arab countries—Bahrain, the United Arab Emirates, Morocco, and Sudan—recognized Israel and normalized diplomatic relationships with it by signing the Abraham Accords. However, in spite of the Palestine Liberation Organization (PLO), which is internationally recognized as the official representative of the Palestinian people, recognised Israel in 1993, violence between Israelis and Palestinians has persisted at a considerable scale and a final settlement has not yet been reached in the Israeli–Palestinian peace process. Nevertheless, the PLO and all of the Arab countries that have signed peace treaties or normalization agreements have accordingly withdrawn from the Arab League boycott of Israel. More recently, a de facto Arab–Israeli alliance has emerged as a counterweight against Iran and the Iranian-led Axis of Resistance; Iran's political and military activities throughout the region, namely as part of a proxy conflict with Saudi Arabia since 1979 and another one with Israel since 1985, have negatively impacted the country's relationship with the Arab League.

== History ==
=== Arab–Jewish conflict in Mandatory Palestine ===
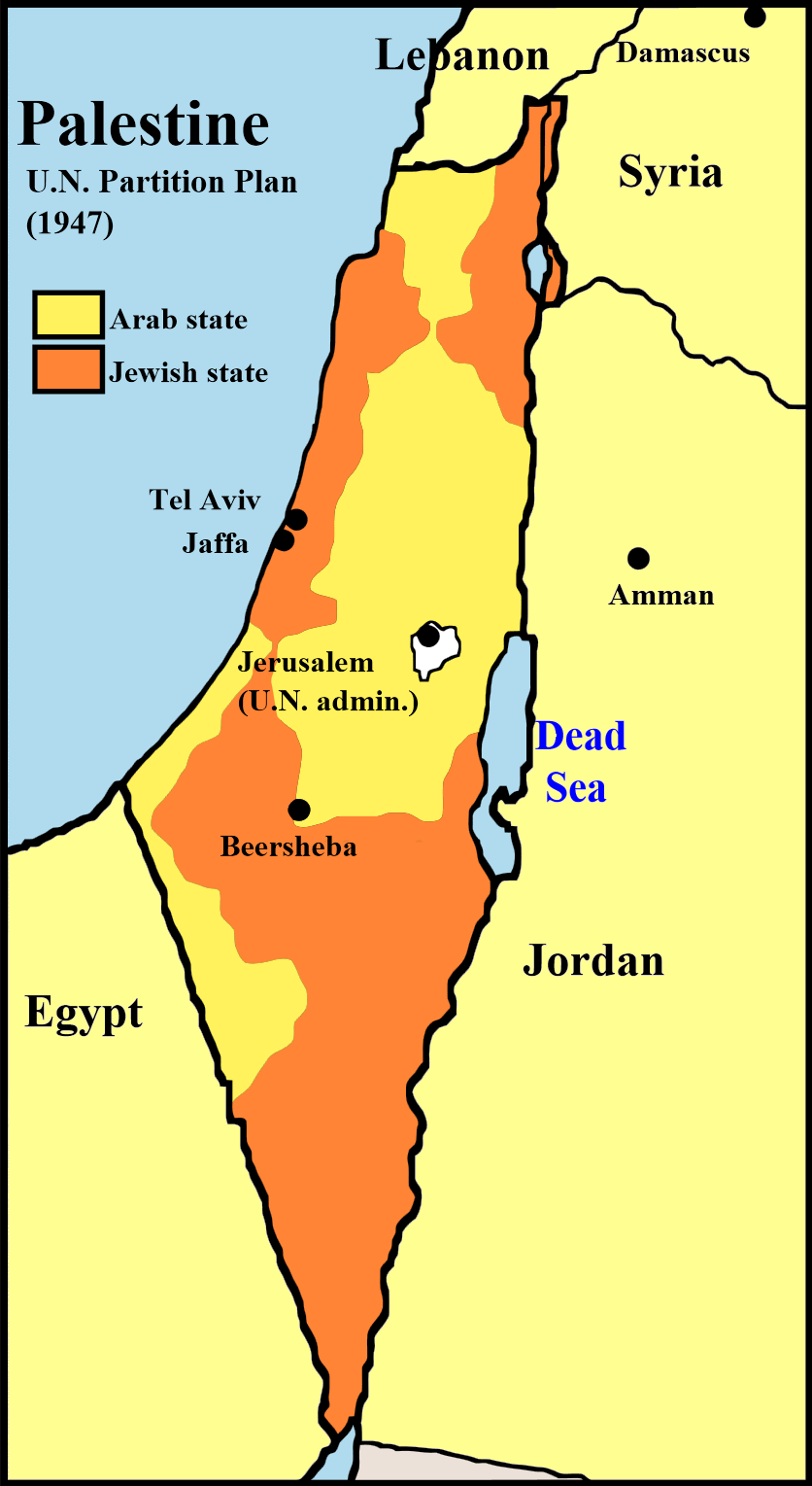
United Nations Partition Plan for Palestine, with yellow denoting the Arab state and orange denoting the Jewish state (1947)

The increased migration of Jews to Ottoman Palestine began in the late 19th century and occurred in several waves. The Ottomans were largely tolerant of Jews. By 1888, there were just under 24,000 Jews living in Palestine, compared to nearly 550,000 Arabs. The mastermind of political Zionism became Theodor Herzl, who published his book The Jewish State in 1896. Due to widespread discrimination against Jews, Herzl said there was a need for a homeland for the Jewish people, and in the book he suggested Argentina and Palestine, respectively, as possible locations for a Jewish state. Herzl, on the advice of other Zionists, chose Palestine and offered to help the Ottoman Sultan pay Ottoman national debts in return for land in Palestine, but the Sultan refused. After the defeat of the Ottomans in World War I (1914-1918), Palestine was administered by the British as the League of Nations Mandate for Palestine, and with the Balfour Declaration, Britain agreed to the eventual establishment of a "national home" for the Jewish people. The Zionists intensified their settlement activities and there was increased violence from the Arab population, e.g., in the Jaffa riots (1921). With the Jewish Agency for Israel, founded in 1929, a quasi-governmental organization was formed to coordinate settlement activity, while the Arabs in Palestine remained less organized. After Adolf Hitler's rise to power in Germany, Jewish migration continued to increase and by 1945 there were over 500,000 Jews living in Palestine. The Arab leader Amin al-Husseini had close contacts with the Nazi regime and between 1936 and 1939 there was an Arab revolt in Palestine against Jewish immigrants and the British. After the end of World War II, many Holocaust survivors came to Palestine and the British prepared to withdraw from Palestine as their position in the region had become untenable. As a result, riots broke out between Jews and the Arab population. The United Nations adopted a partition plan for Palestine on November 29, 1947, which would have given the Arabs 42% of the land area of Palestine and established an international zone in Jerusalem. The partition plan was rejected by the Arab states and the Arabs in Palestine, while the Jews accepted it.

=== 1948 Arab–Israeli War ===
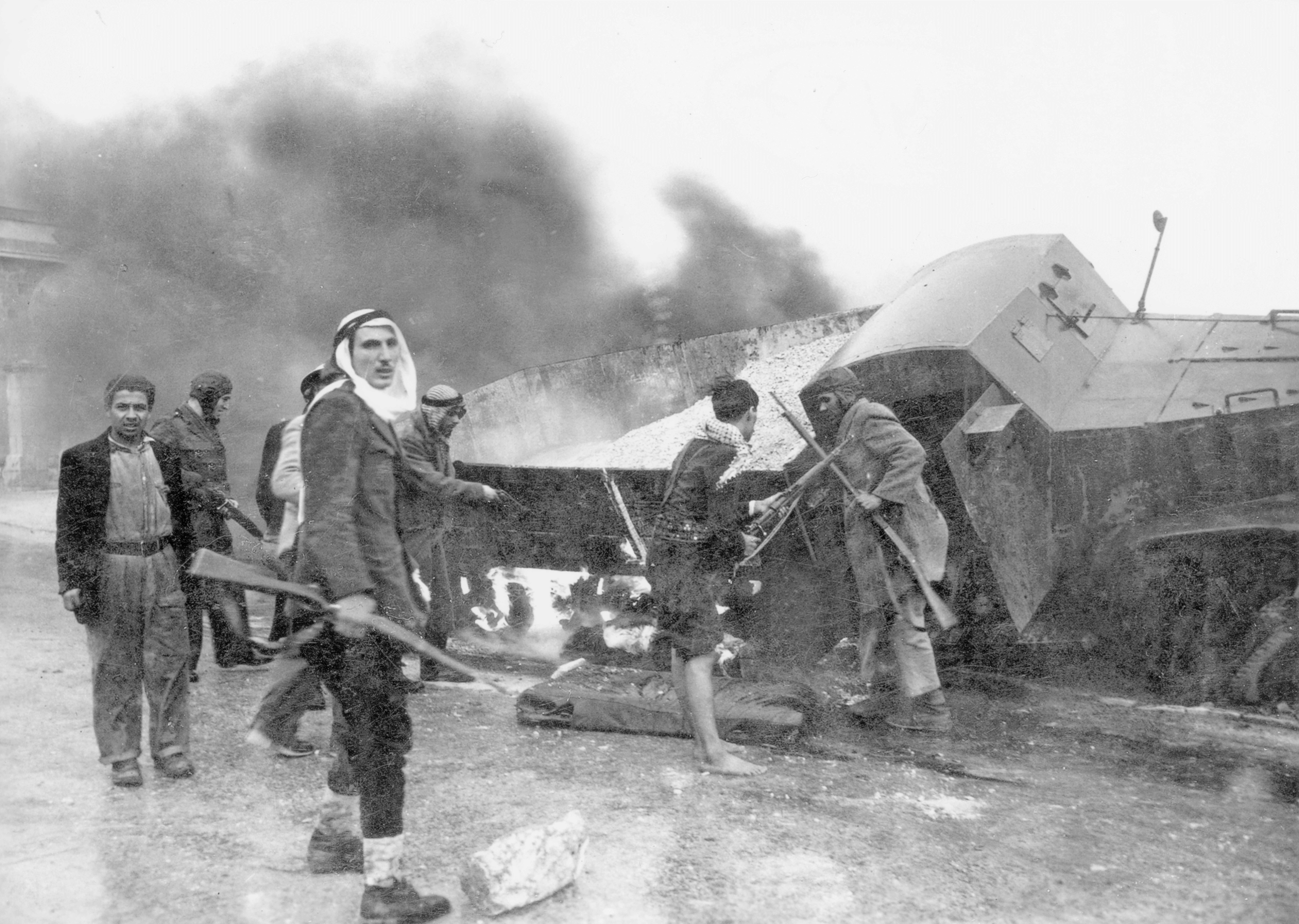
Arab fighters inspecting a destroyed Jewish truck near Jerusalem during the 1948 Arab–Israeli War

After the partition plan was announced, fighting broke out between Arab militias (including the Holy War Army) and Jewish military organizations (including the Haganah). David Ben-Gurion finally announced Israel's declaration of independence on May 14, 1948. In response, a coalition of the Arab states of Egypt, Syria, Lebanon, Jordan, and Iraq attacked the newly formed state. Despite the numerical superiority of the Arabs, they lost large areas to the Israelis such as the important port city of Haifa and by the end of the war Israel controlled 78% of the area of Palestine included in the original partition plan. The war ended with the 1949 Armistice Agreement, the conquered territories remained with Israel and the West Bank was occupied by Jordan and the Gaza Strip by Egypt. The war led to the expulsion of up to 700,000 Arabs from Israel and the conquered territories, who remained as refugees in neighboring Arab countries, the Gaza Strip and the West Bank. In Israel, however, an Arab minority continued to exist thereafter and was granted civic rights. In the Arab countries, the defeat by Israel was perceived as a disaster and was called Nakba (النكبة 'the catastrophe'). A wave of anti-Semitism swept the Arab world and most Jews in Arab countries (totaling some 850,000) were forced to flee to Israel. In the following years, there were repeated Arab attacks on Israeli territory for the purpose of sabotage. Hundreds of Israelis were killed in the process.

=== 1956 Arab–Israeli War ===
The Arab defeat in the first Arab-Israeli War had strengthened Arab nationalism, and in Egypt the nationalist Gamal Abdel Nasser came to power in 1952. He nationalized the Suez Canal, which had been owned by a Franco-British consortium, in July 1956. Because of the strategic importance of the Suez for international shipping, this was also a threat to Israel's national security. As a result, a British-French-Israeli military coalition occupied the Suez Canal. However, the Soviet Union and the United States opposed the occupation and threatened sanctions, so it had to be aborted and Nasser won a diplomatic victory that made him the political leader of the Arab world. Israel's position in the region remained precarious as a result. In response, Israel sought to establish close relations with the non-Arab states of the Near East, such as Turkey and Iran under Mohammad Reza Pahlavi. Thus, clandestine military cooperation was arranged with Turkey in 1958. The United States continued to strive for good relations with the Arab states, even though John F. Kennedy first allowed arms shipments to Israel in 1962, which made possible the later military alliance between the two states. Concerned about its security, Israel began to intensify its nuclear weapons program in the 1960s.

=== 1967 Arab–Israeli War ===
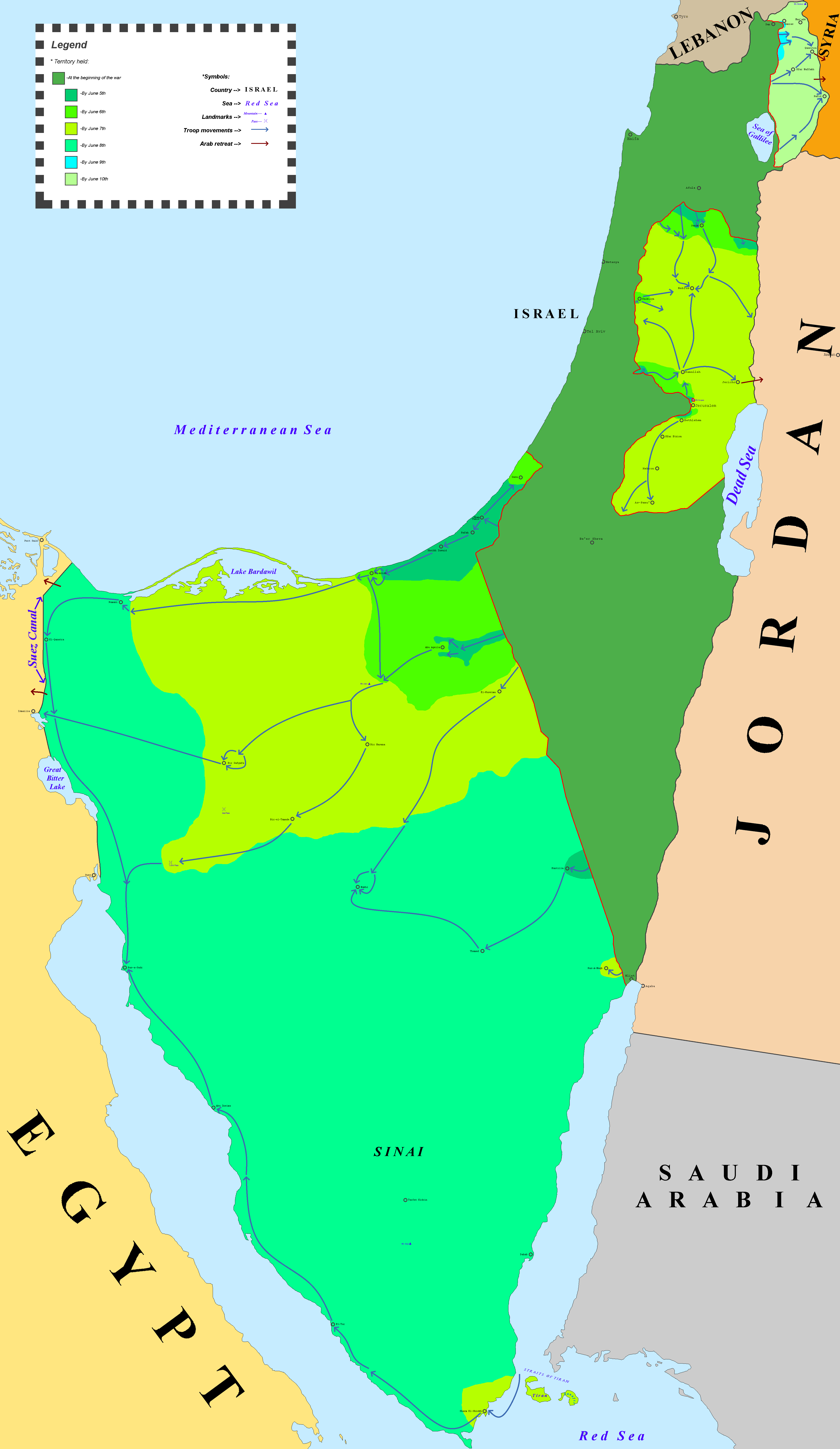
Israel's territorial gains during the 1967 Arab–Israeli War: the Egyptian-occupied Gaza Strip, the Egyptian Sinai Peninsula, the Jordanian-annexed West Bank, and the Syrian Golan Heights

After the Arab states were embroiled in an internal conflict between the revolutionary states of Egypt, Syria and Iraq and the conservative monarchies of Saudi Arabia and Jordan in the early 1960s, the situation for Israel intensified again in the mid-1960s. The militant Palestine Liberation Organization (PLO) was founded in 1964 with Egyptian support. In 1965, clashes between Israel and Syria intensified as the Syrians supported guerrilla attacks on Israel. Egypt escalated the situation with false accusations that Israel was massing troops on its border with the country and closed the Strait of Tiran to Israeli ships. Mediation efforts by the major powers failed, and on June 5, 1967, Israel started the Six-Day War with a pre-emptive strike by the Israeli air force against Egyptian air bases to pre-empt a feared attack by Arab states. An attacking coalition of Egyptian, Jordanian and Syrian troops was defeated by Israel in a triumphant military strike in a very short time. In the process, Israel was able to conquer the Gaza Strip, the West Bank, the Golan Heights and the Sinai Peninsula. The Israelis then offered to return the Sinai and the Golan Heights in return for a peace treaty. The Arab states rejected the offer and passed the Khartoum Resolution on September 1, 1967. The resolution proclaimed the "three no's" (no peace, no negotiations, and no recognition) of the Arab states regarding Israel. Israel then began to build settlements in the conquered territories, which were illegal under international law, and denied political rights to the Palestinians in these territories. The PLO under Yasser Arafat and other militant groups began increasing terrorist attacks on Israeli targets, including airplane hijackings and the 1972 Munich Olympics massacre.

=== 1973 Arab–Israeli War ===
Egypt was not satisfied with the territorial status quo, and from 1968 onward there was an ongoing low-intensity conflict with Israel on the Sinai border. After diplomatic negotiations failed, Egypt under Anwar Sadat launched a surprise attack on Israel on the Jewish holiday of Yom Kippur in October 1973, starting the Yom Kippur War. Syria joined the attack and attacked the Golan Heights, and other Arab states and the Soviet Union also supported the war. During the first two days, Egyptian and Syrian forces advanced, but after that the tide of the war turned in favor of the Israelis, who first had to mobilize their forces. The attack had taken the Israelis by surprise and, after two humiliating defeats, the war was seen as the Arabs' first military victory. Because of the U.S. support for Israel, the Arab states imposed an oil boycott against the West, which led to the 1973 oil crisis. After the Israelis began advancing toward the Nile Delta, a ceasefire agreement went into effect.

==== Egypt–Israel peace treaty (1979) ====
As a result, protracted secret negotiations ensued between the U.S., Egypt and the Israelis for a peace agreement. In 1977, Sadat visited Jerusalem and addressed the Knesset in a historic state visit by an Arab head of state. A year later, mediated by U.S. President Jimmy Carter, the Camp David Accords were concluded, in which Israel declared that it would recognize Palestinian rights and give autonomy to the Palestinian territories. The agreement formed the basis for the 1979 Israeli-Egyptian peace treaty, under which Egypt diplomatically recognized Israel in return for the return of the Sinai. This historic agreement, however, isolated Egypt among the other Arab states that rejected peace with Israel. Sadat was therefore later assassinated by Islamists, but his successor Husni Mubarak did not reverse the normalization of relations with Israel.

=== 1980–2000: Wars in Lebanon, Jordan and PLO peace treaty ===
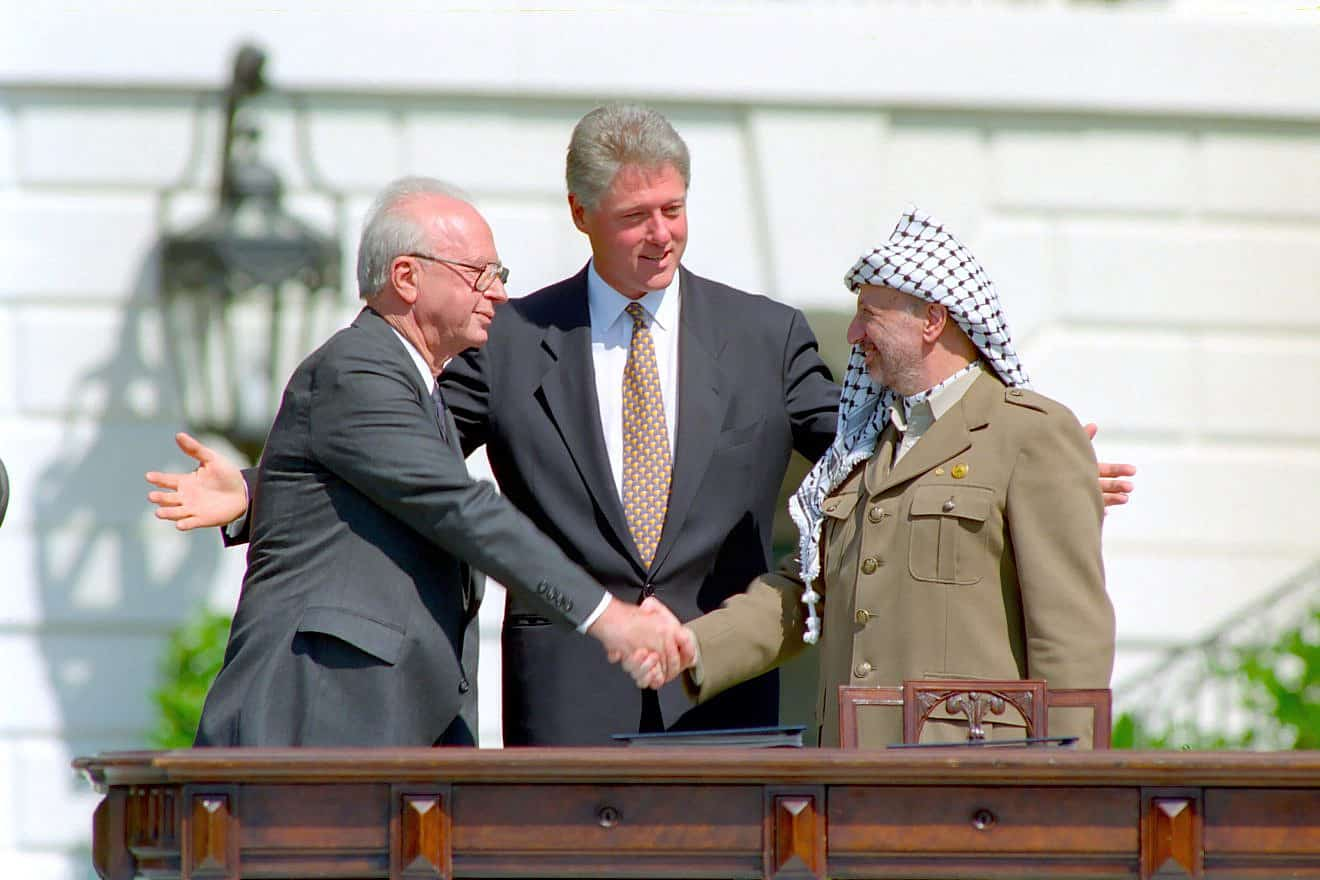
American president Bill Clinton, Israeli prime minister Yitzhak Rabin, and Palestinian president Yasser Arafat at the White House for the Oslo I Accord (1993)

In 1982, Israel intervened in the Lebanese Civil War, with Israeli forces advancing as far as Beirut to fight the PLO, which was active in Lebanon and which subsequently moved its headquarters to Tunisia. After the assassination of Lebanese Maronite President Bachir Gemayel, Maronite militias murdered 900 Palestinians in the Sabra and Shatila massacre, with Israeli support. The Israelis withdrew to southern Lebanon two years later after the 1983 attack on the U.S. base in Beirut and U.S. President Ronald Reagan's withdrawal of American troops from Lebanon. Further peace negotiations were held in the 1980s, but initially without a breakthrough. The First Intifada, a Palestinian uprising that would last several years, began in December 1987, with the radical Hamas establishing itself as a second force alongside the PLO in the Palestinian territories. In 1988, the PLO proclaimed the Palestinian Declaration of Independence and proclaimed the State of Palestine, which was immediately recognized by the Arab states. With the beginning of the 1990s, the Arab states lost their main arms supplier with the collapse of the Soviet Union, and intra-Arab divisions opened up with the Iraqi invasion of Kuwait in 1990. PLO leader Yasser Arafat supported the Iraqis, which led to the expulsion of 400,000 Palestinians from Kuwait after the country's liberation. After prolonged efforts, a breakthrough in negotiations finally occurred in 1993 with the start of the Oslo peace process. This created the Palestinian Authority as the de facto government of the Palestinian territories, while the PLO recognized Israel's right to exist. It also facilitated the Israel-Jordan Peace Treaty, making Jordan the third Arab state to diplomatically recognize Israel in 1994. However, after the assassination of Israeli Prime Minister Yitzhak Rabin by a Jewish extremist in 1995, the peace process stalled. Further efforts were made in the following years. In 2000, efforts to normalize Israeli relations with Syria failed because of Ehud Barak's refusal to fully withdraw from the Golan Heights. That same year, the implementation of a two-state solution also failed. An Israeli offer was to give the Palestinians the Gaza Strip and 91% of the West Bank, while ceding a small portion of Israeli territory to a future Palestinian state. Arafat, however, rejected the offer in the 2000 Camp David Summit.

=== 2000–present: Second Intifada and Gaza Strip conflict ===
With the start of the Second Intifada and the departure of the committed peace broker Bill Clinton from office as U.S. president, the peace process collapsed. Israel increased settlement construction in the West Bank, but withdrew from Gaza in 2005. After Hamas came to power in Gaza, Israel began to tighten the Gaza blockade, with Egypt's assistance from 2008 onward. A rapprochement between Israel and Sunni Arab states took place in the 2010s due to their shared fear of Shiite Iran and its nuclear program. Unofficial cooperation occurred with Saudi Arabia in particular, with intelligence services from both countries assisting each other and officials regularly sharing intelligence. In June 2017, former Israeli Defense Minister Moshe Jaalon stated, "We and the Arabs, the same Arabs who organized in a coalition in the Six-Day War to try to destroy the Jewish state, are in the same boat with us today....The Sunni Arab countries, apart from Qatar, are largely in the same boat with us, because we all see a nuclear Iran as the greatest threat to us all." The term Arab-Israeli conflict would be irrelevant now. On August 16, 2019, Israel's foreign minister Israel Katz made a public declaration about military cooperation with the UAE amidst rising tensions with Iran. Also, on the same day, the UAE for the first time established telephone links to Israel by unblocking direct dialling to Israel's +972 country code.

Following the 2023–present Gaza war, Arab–Israeli relations entered a complex phase characterized by both public criticism and discreet cooperation. While many Arab governments, including those in the Gulf, publicly condemned Israel’s military actions in Gaza and called for an immediate ceasefire, several reports indicated that behind the scenes, security and intelligence coordination between Israel and some Gulf Arab states quietly intensified.

=== 2020: Abraham Accords ===
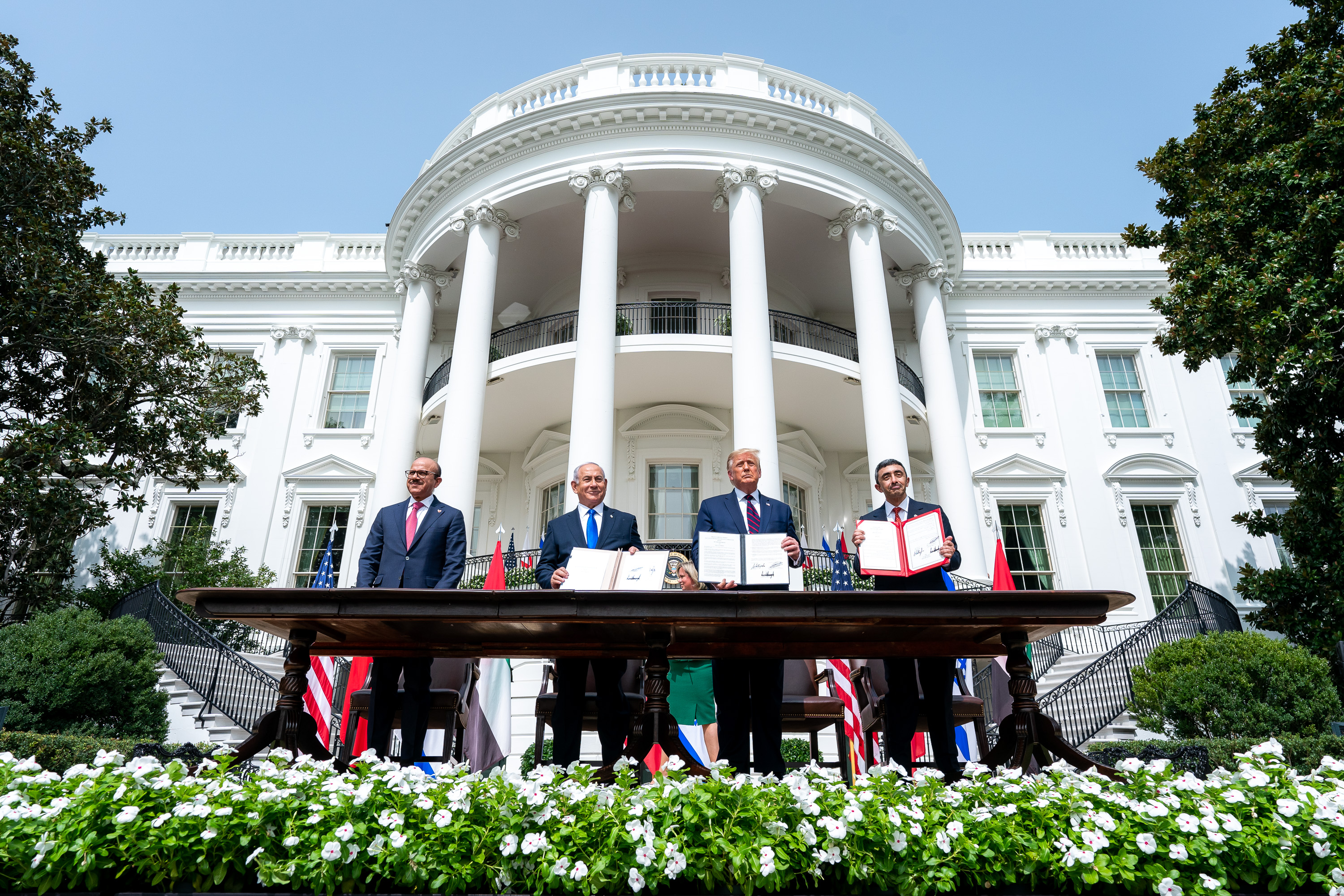
Signings of the Abraham Accords at the White House (2020)

The Israel–United Arab Emirates normalization agreement officially the Abraham Accords Peace Agreement: Treaty of Peace, Diplomatic Relations and Full Normalization Between the United Arab Emirates and the State of Israel, was initially agreed to in a joint statement by the United States, Israel and the United Arab Emirates (UAE) on August 13, 2020, officially referred to as the Abraham Accords. (Note: There is a separate short undated statement headed "The Abraham Accords Declaration": signed by all 4 parties while the agreement between the UAE and Israel contains the following statement "Reaffirming the 'Joint Statement of the United States, the State of Israel, and the United Arab Emirates' (the 'Abraham Accords'), dated 13 August 2020".) The UAE thus became the third Arab country, after Egypt in 1979 and Jordan in 1994, to agree to formally normalize its relationship with Israel, as well as the first Persian Gulf country to do so. Concurrently, Israel agreed to suspend plans for annexing parts of the West Bank. The agreement normalized what had long been informal but robust foreign relations between the two countries. The agreement was signed at the White House on September 15, 2020. At the same time, a treaty was signed between Israel and Bahrain, whereby Bahrain also recognized Israel. Soon after, Sudan and Morocco normalized relations with Israel.

==== 2023: Potential Saudi Arabia normalization and October 7 attacks ====
President Joe Biden said that Hamas’ attacks on Israel were intended in part to scuttle the potential normalization of the U.S. ally's relations with Saudi Arabia. He mentioned that Hamas attacks aimed to halt Israel-Saudi Arabia agreement.

== List of bilateral ties ==
Status of relations with Arab league member states.

Country	Diplomatic relations	Comment	Map
Algeria		Main article: Algeria–Israel relations No diplomatic relations. The country also does not accept Israeli passports.	Lage von Israel und Algerien
Bahrain	2020–present	Main article: Bahrain–Israel relations In September 2020, the normalization agreement between Israel and Bahrain was signed, whereby Bahrain diplomatically recognized Israel. Both countries then exchanged ambassadors.	Lage von Israel und Bahrain
Comoros		Main article: Comoros–Israel relations No diplomatic relations.	
Djibouti		Main article: Djibouti–Israel relations No diplomatic relations.	
Egypt	1979–present	Main article: Egypt–Israel relations Egypt was at war with Israel four times before the Israeli-Egyptian peace treaty of 1979 established a lasting peace between the two countries and diplomatic relations were established. Since then, the two countries have cooperated closely on security issues, for example regarding Hamas in the Gaza Strip or the Sinai. However, diplomatic recognition of Israel was rejected by 85 percent of Egyptians in 2020.	Lage von Israel und Ägypten
Iraq		Main article: Iraq–Israel relations No diplomatic relations. The country also does not accept Israeli passports and Iraqis cannot travel to Israel. Iraqi Kurdistan, however, has better relations with Israel and allows Israelis to enter. Israel also trained Kurdish forces in northern Iraq.	Lage von Israel und dem Irak
Jordan	1994–present	Main article: Israel–Jordan relations Jordan annexed the West Bank in the War of 1948 and lost this territory to Israel after the Six-Day War in 1967. Just under half of Jordan's population is descended from Palestinian refugees. Israel has maintained full diplomatic relations with Jordan since the signing of the Israel-Jordan Peace Treaty in 1994.	Lage von Israel und Jordanien
Kuwait		Main article: Israel–Kuwait relations No diplomatic relations. In response to Donald Trump's 2020 announcement that Kuwait could be the next Arab country to recognize Israel, Kuwait rejected the claim, stating, "Kuwait will be the last country to recognize Israel".	Lage von Israel und Kuwait
Lebanon		Main article: Israel–Lebanon relations No diplomatic relations. The country also does not accept Israeli passports. Israel intervened in the Lebanese Civil War in 1982 and waged war against Hezbollah in the 2006 Lebanon War. Both countries resolved their maritime border dispute in 2022.	Lage von Israel und Libanon
Libya		Main article: Israel–Libya relations No diplomatic relations. Under the rule of Muammar Gaddafi (1969–2011), Libya supported militant Palestinian groups and terrorism against Israel.	Lage von Israel und Libyen
Morocco	1994–2000, 2020–present	Main article: Israel–Morocco relations After the start of the Oslo Peace Process, the two countries grew closer. However, in October 2000, the Israeli representative office was closed and relations were suspended. On December 10, 2020, an agreement to normalize relations was announced.	Lage von Israel und Marokko
Mauritania	1999–2010	Main article: Israel–Mauritania relations Both countries established diplomatic relations in 1999. After the start of the Gaza War (2008–2009) Mauritania broke off diplomatic relations and expelled the Israeli ambassador.	Lage von Israel und Mauretanien
Oman	1996–2000	Main article: Israel–Oman relations No diplomatic relations. Oman accepts Israeli passports only for transit, not for entry. Establishment of relations to some extent in January 1996. Closure of the Israeli representative office and suspension of relations in October 2000 during the Second Intifada.	Lage von Israel und Oman
Palestine		Main article: Israel–Palestine relations Still unresolved Israeli-Palestinian conflict. A large proportion of Palestinians were expelled from Israel during the War of 1948 and Israel refused the right of return. Gaza and the West Bank came under Israeli control in 1967 as a result of the Six-Day War. The Oslo Peace Process created the Palestinian Authority and the PLO recognized Israel, but a settlement of the conflict through a two-state solution failed. There have been repeated uprisings by the Palestinians, while Israel has continued to act as an occupying power, building settlements that threaten the future implementation of a two-state solution. Israel has largely cooperative relations with Fatah in the West Bank, but hostile relations with Hamas in the Gaza Strip.	Lage von Israel und Palästina
Qatar		Main article: Israel–Qatar relations No diplomatic relations. In April 1996, Qatar and Israel agreed to exchange trade representations. The representations was closed in February 2009 because of Israeli attacks on Gaza. Israeli passports are not accepted by Qatar. Only during the 2022 FIFA World Cup were Israelis allowed to enter the country. Qatar is a major financial supporter of the Palestinian Sunni Islamic fundamentalist group Hamas.	Lage von Israel und Katar
Saudi Arabia		Main article: Israel–Saudi Arabia relations No diplomatic relations. The country also does not accept Israeli passports. However, there is informal cooperation between the two countries on security policy. Negotiations have been held on normalizing diplomatic relations. Saudi Arabia, however, demands the implementation of a two-state solution for full normalization of relations.	Israel and Saudi Arabia
Somalia		Main articles: Israel–Somalia relations and Israel–Somaliland relations There are no formal diplomatic relations between the two countries because Somalia does not recognize Israel as an independent state. Israel recognized Somaliland, an unrecognized state that declared independence from Somalia on 26 December 2025, as a sovereign state.	
Sudan	2020–present	Main article: Israel–Sudan relations Through an agreement in 2020, Sudan recognized Israel.	Lage von Israel und Sudan
Syria		Main article: Israel–Syria relations No diplomatic relations. The country also does not accept Israeli passports. Both countries have been in a state of war three times.Syria's relations with Israel are very poor due to Israel's occupation of the Golan Heights and Syria's close ties with the anti-Israel militant group Hezbollah and the Islamic Republic of Iran. In 2000, a normalization of relations failed because of Israel's refusal to fully return the Golan Heights.	Lage von Israel und Syrien
Tunisia	1994–2000	Main article: Israel–Tunisia relations Relations were established during the Oslo peace process. Tunisia broke off relations again in October 2000 during the Second Intifada.	Lage von Israel und Tunesien
United Arab Emirates	2020–present	Main article: Israel–United Arab Emirates relations Israel and the United Arab Emirates announced the establishment of diplomatic relations on August 13, 2020. In July 2021, the United Arab Emirates officially opened an embassy in Israel, becoming only the third majority-Arab nation to maintain full diplomatic relations with Israel. The two countries also cooperate on security policy and want to deepen their economic ties. The first direct commercial flight from Israel to the UAE took place on August 31, 2020, and the first ship carrying cargo from the United Arab Emirates to Israel entered the Port of Haifa on October 12.	Lage von Israel und der Vereinigten Arabischen Emirate
Yemen		Main article: Israel–Yemen relations No diplomatic relations. The country also does not accept Israeli passports.	Lage von Israel und Jemen

== See also ==
- Arab–Israeli alliance
- Arab League and the Arab–Israeli conflict
- Foreign relations of the Arab League
- Foreign relations of Israel
- UAE–Israel land corridor
