= 2025 Borama protests =

Civil unrest and crackdown in Borama, Somaliland in December 2025

- Date: 4 December 2025
- Location: Borama, Awdal, Somaliland
- Caused by: Controversy over Xeer Ciise event; local political tensions
- Result: Crackdown by security forces; casualties reported

Casualties and losses
	At least 19 killed and over 200 injured

The 2025 Borama protests were a series of demonstrations and violent events that took place in December 2025 in Borama, the capital of the Awdal region in Somaliland.

The protests began in early December over controversy surrounding a planned "Xeer Ciise" event, in addition to anti Government corruption and escalated into widespread unrest.

According to human rights organizations and media reports, security forces used live ammunition against demonstrators, resulting in civilian deaths and injuries.

The unrest was described as one of the most serious incidents in Borama in recent years and led to political consequences, including the resignation of a government minister and the postponement of the planned event.

== Background ==
Tensions in the Awdal region had been rising prior to the protests amid political disagreements and local grievances. A key trigger was controversy surrounding a planned event related to "Xeer Ciise", a customary legal tradition.

Reports also linked the unrest to broader governance-related tensions in the region.

Borama served as the central location of the unrest, with most reported incidents and demonstrations concentrated in the city.

== Protests and crackdown ==
=== Timeline ===
- 4–5 December 2025 – Initial protests begin in Borama following controversy over the planned Xeer Ciise event.
- Early escalation – Demonstrations grow and clashes are reported.
- Peak violence – Security forces use live ammunition, resulting in casualties.
- Following days – Government response measures are announced, including postponement of the event.

Protests began as public demonstrations and escalated into violence as security forces moved to disperse crowds.

According to the Human Rights Centre Somaliland, security forces used live ammunition against unarmed civilian protesters.

Media reports similarly stated that security forces opened fire during the protests. Reports described widespread disruption in the city, including road blockages and closures of businesses.

== Casualties ==
Casualty figures varied between sources. The Human Rights Centre Somaliland reported that at least 17 unarmed civilians were killed and more than 50 others injured.

Other reports indicated that at least 10 people were killed and dozens wounded. Additional reporting suggested higher totals, including at least 19 deaths and more than 200 injuries. Many of the injured were treated in local hospitals, while others were transferred for further medical care.

== Government response ==
Authorities deployed security forces to contain the unrest and restore order. Officials called for calm and attributed the unrest to destabilizing factors.

The planned Xeer Ciise-related event was postponed following the violence. The unrest also led to political consequences, including the resignation of a government minister, and a cabinet shuffle.

== Aftermath ==
Local elders and community leaders intervened to de-escalate tensions. The unrest disrupted daily life in Borama, with businesses closing and movement restricted during periods of violence.

Civil society organizations raised concerns about the impact on civic space and political stability in the Awdal region.

== Significance ==
The protests were described as one of the deadliest incidents in Borama in recent years.

Observers noted that the unrest highlighted underlying political and regional tensions within Somaliland, particularly in Awdal.

== Related protests (December 26–30) ==
On 26 December 2025, Israel became the first country to formally recognize Somaliland as an independent state.

The recognition prompted protests across Somali-populated regions. The Associated Press reported that tens of thousands of Somalis took part in nationwide demonstrations opposing the recognition.

In Borama, demonstrations were also reported, where participants expressed opposition to the recognition and solidarity with Palestine, and opposed the recognition of Somaliland.

== See also ==
- Politics of Somaliland
- Awdal
- International recognition of Somaliland
