= One Somalia =

Policy towards Somali unity

A map of the territories the "One Somalia" policy recognizes as part of Somalia

One Somalia is a phrase with variant meanings, adopted by various nations around the world and other actors to describe their stance on the recognition and diplomatic approach towards the Republic of Somaliland, and Somalia's national unity. The "One Somalia" policy is often applied in the context of supporting the idea that Somaliland is part of Somalia regardless of the de facto partially recognized Republic of Somaliland's political existence within the region of Somaliland. In some circles the term may also have a more pan-Somali significance, supporting the unification of all Somalis under one state. This policy is both a national and internationally held policy by those states that do not recognize the independence of the Republic of Somaliland as legitimate.

== History ==
=== Siad Barre's government ===
The Siad Barre government instituted a policy named the "One Somalia policy" aimed at ending clan loyalties and diminish their influence within the nation; "One Somalia policy", in this context, meaning one central government that exercises the monopoly of force, political power and influence in the nation.

=== Contemporary context ===
The SNM (Somali National Movement) initially was unionist (thus supported the unity of Somalia and Somaliland), however, over time it adopted an independentist ideology and intention. Under the leadership of Abdirahman Ahmed Ali Tuur, the local administration declared Somaliland independent at a conference held in Burao between 27 April 1991 and 15 May 1991.

After this declaration, for over three decades, most nations assumed the position that internationally recognized borders should not be altered unilaterally, to avoid encouraging secessionist movements elsewhere. Thus starting the "One Somalia policy" we know of today.

=== National implications ===
Somalia's federal government claims, through the declarations of the Somali constitution, that the federal government legally has the monopoly of foreign relations with other international entities, and thus, that only they can pursue diplomatic meetings, deals and investments by other nations. Thus, any instance in which a federal subject (or multiple of them) unilaterally pursue any kind of diplomatic mission with another nation without the strict consent of the federal government, is to be considered unconstitutional and thus illegal. This policy has been pointed out since the creation of the 2012 federal constitution and has been the basis for the condemnation of any diplomatic relation between Somaliland and other political entities from then on. The policy, nationally speaking, also highlights how Hargeisa being unilaterally declared a capital city by Somaliland is unconstitutional as the constitution clearly state that the city of Mogadishu is the capital of Somalia, and that such law applies to all federal subjects of Somalia, including the northern regions that compose Somaliland.

Due to these reasons, Somalia obstacled various investment plans, infrastructural plans and diplomatic plans pursued by other nations with Somalilander authorities; Most notably, projects that involved Israel, the United States and the United Arab Emirates.

Somalia remains firm about its national unity, stating that they would not recognize Somaliland throughout the years. Somalia's final objective with this policy is to eventually integrate Somaliland once again within its own system, government and de facto control.

=== International attitude ===
==== China ====
Chinese endorsement of a "One Somalia" policy is strictly tied to its "One China" policy within a "bilateral commitment to unity" context, as well as China's presence in Djibouti, which could possibly be challenged in the event of an internationally recognized Somaliland.

==== Denmark ====
Even though Denmark was the first western country which opened up a diplomatic outpost within Somalilander soil in 2012, they always stated that such efforts were aimed to create a "stable Somalia".

A diplomatic incident between Somalia and Denmark ensued over Somaliland when the Danish ambassador that operates within Somaliland responded to a British diplomat remarking to him that he was treating Somaliland as a country with a firm "We are used to it". The ambassador, Steen Sonne Andersen, was then called upon by Somalia's minister of foreign affairs, Ahmed Moallim Fiqi, for a meeting in which he confirmed Denmark's support for the "One Somalia policy" and Somalia's territorial integrity. Denmark later confirmed this position once again on 29 December 2025 in an emergency session called by the UN Security Council following Israel's recognition of Somaliland, in which, the Danish UN ambassador stated that the recognition had set a "dangerous precedent" and warned against recognising Somaliland.

==== Turkey ====
Turkish support for the "One Somalia" policy was observed since at least 2012.

After the Memorandum of Understanding Signed between Ethiopia and Somaliland, on 4 January 2024, Turkey voiced its concern regarding the situation and highlighted that they supported the unity, sovereignty and territorial integrity of the Federal Republic of Somalia, affirming its "One Somalia" policy.

In August 2025 a Turkish ambassador met with Somalilander elder Sultan Abubakar Wabar and talked about plans to further stabilize the Awdal region, but did so by always framing it within the context of a united Somalia, explicitly citing the country's "One Somalia" policy. This drew significant criticism by Somalilander authorities.

Turkey's explicitly "One Somalia" policy draws negative opinions from Somalilander observers, with some noting it is allegedly tied to its own perception and awareness of separatist movements in Turkish Kurdistan.

==== United States of America ====
The U.S State Department, at least from the 2013, adopted an explicit "One Somalia" policy. Secretary of State Hillary Clinton, after the failure of the 2012 Benghazi disaster sought to restore national credibility by recognizing the 2012 Somali federal constitution and government. Since then, the U.S. has embraced a "One Somalia" policy by embracing Somalia's constitutional implications and refusing to recognized the Republic of Somaliland as an independent state.

This position was kept by the following U.S. administrations.

For example, this continued to be the case under Trump's first presidency. In 2017 Trump applied his travel ban to the entirety of what the administration recognized as Somalia, thus including Somaliland.

Under Biden's presidency the "One Somalia policy" continued to be pursued, and any kind of aid or nation-building efforts were all directed towards the creation of a single Somali state under Mogadishu's government, with the U.S. accepting Somaliland's ultimate fate to be annexed by the federal government of Somalia in the future. The Biden administration put an emphasis on the "One Somalia" policy within every interaction between the U.S. and Somaliland. Despite the Biden administration's adversion to recognizing Somaliland as a separate entity from Somalia, in March 2021 a bill proposed that the U.S. secretary of state would have to report annually on U.S. assistance to Somaliland and assess a security partnership without formal recognition, and in 2023, a National Defense Authorization Act explicitly called for developing U.S. relations with Somaliland, however it was blocked as the State Department and White House allegedly lobbied against it due to them considering the One Somalia Policy more beneficial.

The second Trump presidency continued to pursue the "One Somalia policy". Molly Phee, the U.S. assistant secretary of state for African affairs, explicitedly pointed out during his meeting with ex Somalilander president Muse Bihi that the U.S. would continue to engage with Somaliland "within the framework of our single Somalia policy", in a similar way to the One China policy. This was later reaffirmed after the UN Security Council meeting called after the Israeli recognition of Somaliland, during which the U.S. stated that the "One Somalia policy" was still in place and that the U.S. would not recognize Somaliland. However, once again, as with the precedent administration, the second Trump presidency showed that not everyone was in line with the "One Somalia policy", with proposals of recognition being discussed in Project 2025, by high ranking politicians and Trump acknowledging Somaliland's stability and democratic record in August 2025.

Even though U.S. diplomats tend to invoke a "One Somalia policy" in order to justify focusing support on Mogadishu and not recognizing Somaliland, there is no actual written form of such a policy in U.S. law or formal doctrine, and it is merely just an attitude.

== Criticism ==
One point brought up against the "One Somalia" policy challenges the idea that recognizing Somaliland would cause instability in the region, stating instead that the hesitant approach against recognition over the years "only empowered destabilizing actors" in the region.

Other opinionists question the legality of the "One Somalia" policy in the context of the African Union's colonial borders policy, arguing that forcing unionism goes against it and that it merely bolsters local dangerous Somali nationalism and irredentism.

Criticism does not only come from Somaliland or in international contexts, but it is also brought up nationally, with some parts of the local opposition within Somalia putting the narrative into question, especially following December 2025.
