= Denmark–Somaliland relations =

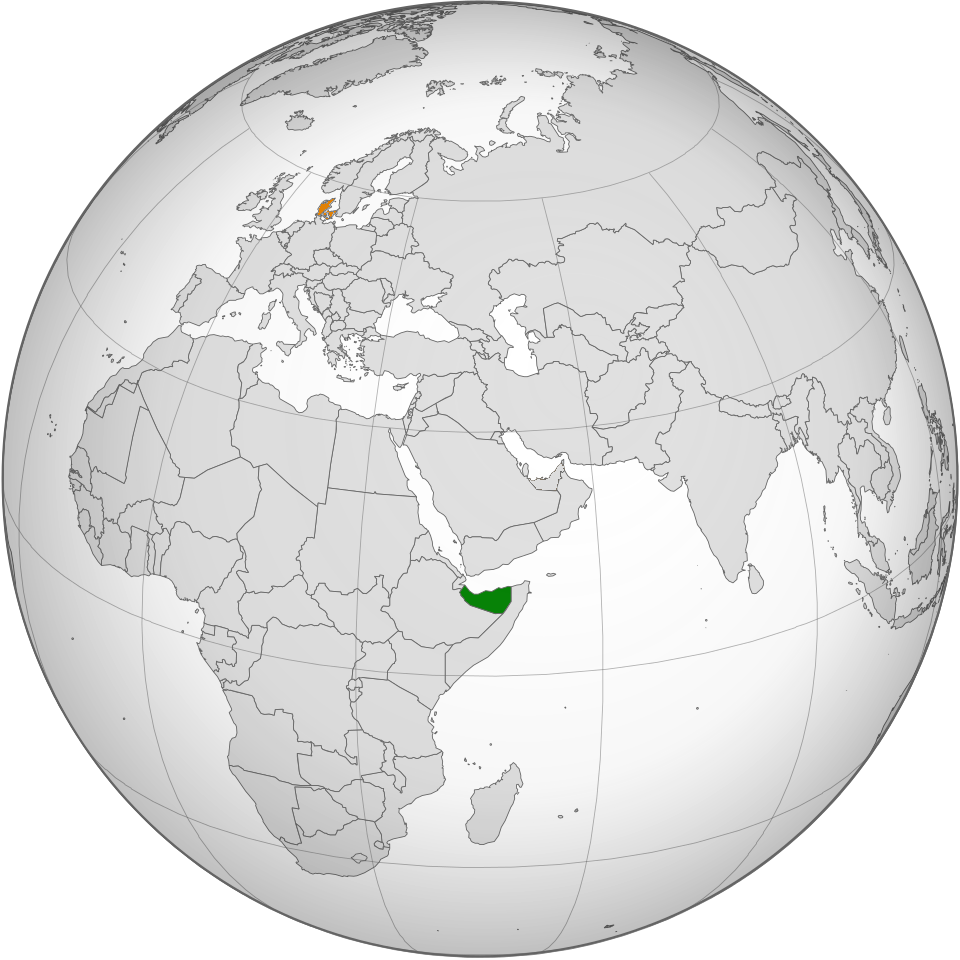

- Somaliland: Denmark

Denmark and Somaliland have direct bilateral ties as well as an office functioning as a diplomatic outpost for bilateral ties between the two political entities that is located within Somaliland's capital. Danish financial support has been crucial in the development of Somaliland in the 2010s due to their involvement in the "Somaliland Development Fund". Denmark recognizes the region of Somaliland as part of Somalia and discouraged other nations in December 2025 from recognizing it.

== History ==
=== 1990s ===
The Danish, while not initially directly interacting with the Republic of Somaliland, pursued a policy against Somali piracy in the area with remarkable results that directly influenced the ability "to collect taxes and deliver basic services, as well as a markedly strengthened crisis response and handling of internally persons" in both the Republic's domain and in the area of Puntland.

=== 2010s ===
In 2012 Denmark was the first western nation to create a bilateral program office in Somaliland. The Danish Minister for Development Corporation, Christian Friis Bach, commented how the opening of the diplomatic office was a step towards the development of "fragile states" around the world, praising the local administration for their development and management of the area. The minister also added that 112 million Danish kroner would be spent over the next four years in Somaliland to develop the area, fund the local administration's efforts and build a more "stable Somalia". At the same time, the "Somaliland Development Fund" was created and Denmark, as well as Norway, became the main funders of the project. The project was crucial to Somaliland's development in the 2010s. Funds continued even after the four-year deadline for the following years through the SDF. As of currently, the project allowed "1,4 million citizens to get access to over 11 million liters of water per day, built over 150 km of roads, and supported climate-smart agriculture through soil/water conservation on over 2,500 hectares of land."

Following 2016, relations increased in intensity, and in 2017 Danish ambassador Mette Knudsen directly met the president of Somaliland as to strengthen diplomatic and economic relations between the two political entities.

=== 2020s ===
In 2020 after the delay of the 2020 Somalilander elections, later moved to 2021, the Danish strengthened its diplomatic presence within Somaliland, with a Danish ambassador sent by Hargeisa's office meeting the Somaliland's president and the local opposition parties to discuss the delay. In the 2024–2028 framework paper released by the Ministry of Foreign Affairs, Denmark emphasized that danish presence in Somaliland will continue for the years to come and that it will only strengthen as to protect the local "relatively stable" political reality and prevent any external non-western actors from influencing Somaliland, with Denmark's goal being to significantly impact Somaliland's own policies.

A diplomatic incident between Somalia and Denmark ensued over Somaliland when the Danish ambassador that operates within Somaliland responded to a British diplomat remarking to him that he was treating Somaliland as a country with a firm "We are used to it". The ambassador, Steen Sonne Andersen, was then called upon by Somalia's minister of foreign affairs, Ahmed Moallim Fiqi, for a meeting in which he confirmed Denmark's support for the "One Somalia policy" and Somalia's territorial integrity. Denmark later confirmed this position once again on 29 December 2025 in an emergency session called by the UN Security Council following Israel's recognition of Somaliland, in which, the Danish UN ambassador stated that the recognition had set a "dangerous precedent" and warned against recognising Somaliland.
