= International recognition of Somaliland =

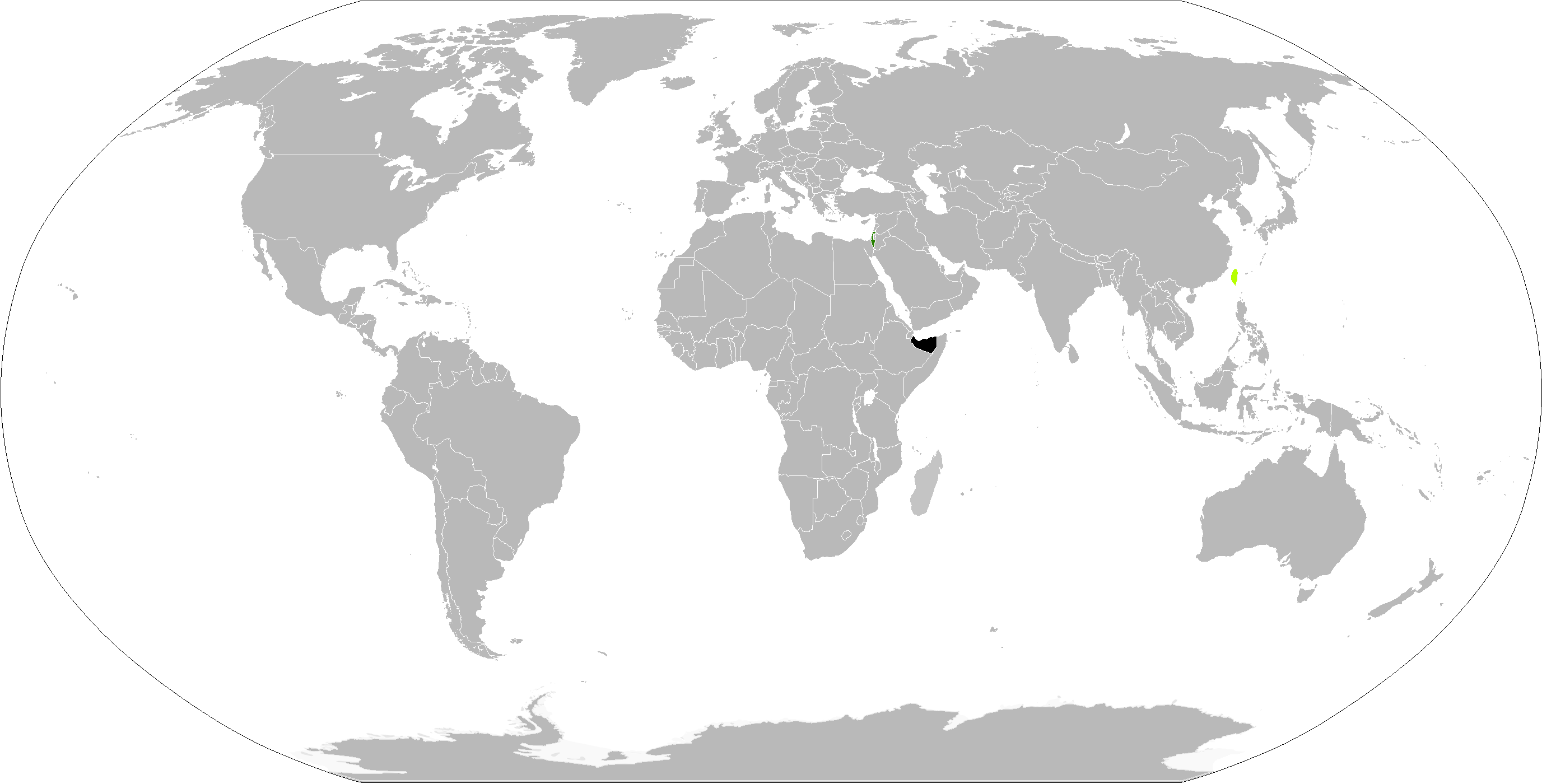
International recognition of Somaliland Somaliland States that have recognised Somaliland (Israel) States whose recognition of Somaliland is unclear (Taiwan)

As of October 2026, Somaliland is recognised as a sovereign state by one UN member state – Israel. The Republic of Somaliland was proclaimed on 18 May 1991 claiming to be the legal successor to the State of Somaliland which gained independence from the United Kingdom on 26 June 1960 and merged into the Somali Republic five days later. Somalia continues to claim Somaliland as an integral part of its territory, considering it to be one of its federal member states.

In 2020, Taiwan and Somaliland began engaging in ambiguous, high-level relations. On 26 December 2025, Israel became the first country and UN member state to formally recognise Somaliland as an independent country.

== History ==
The region of modern day Somaliland was ruled by various groups including most recently the Isaaq Sultanate before coming under British rule in 1884. While under British rule, British Somaliland defined the borders that are today claimed by the Republic of Somaliland.

In June 1960, British Somaliland gained its independence from the United Kingdom as the State of Somaliland. The following month, in July 1960, the State of Somaliland merged with the Trust Territory of Somaliland to form Somalia. In May 1991, Somaliland declared independence from Somalia.

In September 2017, Somaliland and the micronation Liberland (Note: Micronations are trivial entities that claim statehood but lack diplomatic recognition and self-governance. Liberland is a micronation, not a sovereign state, and fails to meet both the constitutive and declarative theories of statehood.) signed a memorandum of understanding that "begun the process of mutual recognition". In January 2024, Somaliland and Ethiopia signed a memorandum of understanding which include a provision that the latter would recognise the former as an independent state. However, Ethiopia later signed the Ankara Declaration in December 2024 that reaffirmed support for Somalia's territorial integrity.

On 26 December 2025, Israel became the first UN member state to recognise Somaliland. At the request of Algeria, Sierra Leone, Somalia, and Guyana, the United Nations Security Council convened for an emergency session on 29 December following Israel's recognition of Somaliland.

== States that recognise Somaliland ==
No.	Country	Date of recognition	Ref.	Diplomatic relations	Relevant membership, further details
1	Israel	26 December 2025		Yes	Israel–Somaliland relations

== States whose recognition of Somaliland is unclear ==
Name	Official position
Taiwan	Main article: Somaliland–Taiwan relations It is unclear whether Taiwan and Somaliland recognise each other as independent states. In 2020, Taiwan and Somaliland signed a bilateral cooperation agreement and established mutual representative offices, (Note: The establishment of "representative offices" rather than formal embassies deliberately avoids the issue of diplomatic recognition.) though this did not amount to formal diplomatic relations. When asked to clarify whether Taiwan recognises Somaliland as independent, foreign minister Joseph Wu responded "Somaliland has been independent since 1991." Somaliland treats Taiwan as a sovereign entity separate from China.

== States that do not recognise Somaliland ==
=== Member and observer states of the United Nations ===
Name	Official position
Afghanistan	The Taliban, which de facto governs Afghanistan but does not hold the country's seat at the UN, stated that recognising Somaliland was against international law, and that it was wrong to support the division of a Muslim country as it undermined Somalia's sovereignty and would destabilise the region.
Algeria	Algeria rejected Israel's recognition of Somaliland, stating that it violates Somalia's sovereignty, unity, and territorial integrity and contravenes international law. The Algerian Ministry of Foreign Affairs emphasised that the move conflicts with the principles of the United Nations Charter and the African Union, particularly the inviolability of inherited national borders, and reaffirmed Algeria's continued support for the Federal Republic of Somalia and regional stability in the Horn of Africa.
Azerbaijan	On 29 December 2025, the Azerbaijani Ministry of Foreign Affairs released the following statement: “Recognition of the “Somaliland” region of the Federal Republic of Somalia contradicts norms and principles of international law and the UN Charter. Azerbaijan has gone through its own painful experience with foreign military occupation and separatism in its territories, in violation of international law. Guided by these principles and its own experience, the Republic of Azerbaijan remains firmly committed to the preservation of sovereignty, territorial integrity, and political independence of all states, and calls on the international community to act responsibly and in full compliance with international law”.
China	The People's Republic of China emphasised its firm support for Somalia's sovereignty, unity, and territorial integrity, reaffirming that Somaliland is an inseparable part of Somalia and opposing "foreign support for separatist forces".
Comoros	The Comoros signed a joint official statement along with various Arab and Muslim countries which stated that they officially condemned the "serious repercussions to peace and security in the Horn of Africa and the Red Sea region, and its serious impacts on international peace and security" that came with recognising Somaliland.
Cuba	Foreign Minister Bruno Rodríguez Parrilla reaffirmed the country's opposition to Israel's recognition of Somaliland, siding with the African Union and other regional groups that opposed the action.
Cyprus	The Ministry of Foreign Affairs joined the European Union in demanding respect for Somalia's sovereignty and territorial integrity.
Denmark	Main article: Denmark–Somaliland relations The Danish UN ambassador who participated in the UN Security Council meeting that took place on 29 December 2025 stated that the recognition had set a "dangerous precedent" and warned against recognising Somaliland.
Djibouti	Djibouti has emphasised "full support for the unity, sovereignty and territorial integrity of Somalia."
Egypt	Egypt has emphasised "full support for the unity, sovereignty and territorial integrity of Somalia."
Eritrea	The Eritrean Ministry of Information stated in a press release that the "ploy" of recognition had been underway for some time before the first recognition by a UN member state, and that it was not surprising. Eritrea also called specifically on China to intervene more firmly against it, as, according to the Ministry, they had a moral obligation to intervene similarly with the Taiwanese situation.
Ethiopia	Main article: Ethiopia–Somaliland relations Ethiopia has historically supported Somaliland. In January 2024, Somaliland and Ethiopia signed a memorandum of understanding which includes a provision that the latter would recognise the former as an independent state. However, Ethiopia later signed the Ankara Declaration in December 2024 that reaffirmed its support for Somalia's territorial integrity.
France	On 29 December 2025, during the UN Security Council meeting on the Somalilander question, the French representative stated that foreign nations should not interfere in internal Somali politics and that such internal policies should be discussed amongst the interested Somali stakeholders. France also highlighted to avoid any move that could possibly "compromise peace and security" in the Horn of Africa and the Gulf of Aden.
Gambia	The Gambia signed a joint official statement various Arab and Muslim countries which stated that they officially condemned the "serious repercussions to peace and security in the Horn of Africa and the Red Sea region, and its serious impacts on international peace and security" that came with recognising Somaliland.
Greece	Greece's UN ambassador, during the UN Security Council meeting on the Somalilander question that took place on 29 December 2025, stated that: “Support for secessionist entities within Somalia, which could destabilise the country and lead to a reversal of hard-won counter-terrorism gains, is unacceptable" and that such actions went against the goals of the United Nations Transitional Assistance Mission in Somalia.
Guinea-Bissau	The Foreign Ministry denied social media claims regarding the country's consideration of recognising Somaliland, emphasising its foreign policy commitment to sovereignty, territorial integrity, and adherence to the principles of the United Nations and the African Union.
Guyana	Guyana's UN ambassador, during the UN Security Council meeting on the Somalilander question that took place on 29 December 2025, stated that any attempt to recognise Somaliland was to be considered "null and void" as well as a threat to Somalia's national security.
India	During the 9 January 2026 Ministry of External Affairs press conference, spokesperson Randhir Jaiswal stated that India has strong relations with Somalia and underlined preservation of the "sovereignty and territorial integrity of the country".
Indonesia	People's Consultative Assembly deputy speaker Hidayat Nur Wahid condemned Israel's move to recognise Somaliland, calling it an "old attempt to divide and rule, in order to ease the Greater Israel agenda".
Iran	Iran condemned Israel's recognition of Somaliland as a "flagrant violation of Somalia's sovereignty."
Iraq	Iraq claimed in a joint official statement with other Arab countries that they condemned the "serious repercussions to peace and security in the Horn of Africa and the Red Sea region, and its serious impacts on international peace and security" that came with recognising Somaliland.
Jordan	Jordan issued a joint official statement, also signed by various Arab and Muslim countries, which stated that they officially condemned the "serious repercussions to peace and security in the Horn of Africa and the Red Sea region, and its serious impacts on international peace and security" that came with recognising Somaliland.
Kuwait	Kuwait has declared full support for Somalia's sovereignty over all its territory.
Lebanon	The Lebanese Ministry of Foreign Affairs and Emigrants stated full support for the sovereignty and territorial integrity of Somalia.
Libya	Libya claimed in a joint official statement with other Arab countries that they condemned the "serious repercussions to peace and security in the Horn of Africa and the Red Sea region, and its serious impacts on international peace and security" that came with recognising Somaliland.
Malaysia	Malaysia criticised Israel's recognition of Somaliland and opposed "any attempt to use the territory, or any other location, for the forcible transfer or displacement of Palestinians from Gaza". Prime Minister Anwar Ibrahim denounced it as "wholly unacceptable," violating international law and humanitarian standards, and perpetuating injustice rather than promoting peace.
Maldives	The Maldives claimed in a joint official statement with Arab and Muslim that they condemned the "serious repercussions to peace and security in the Horn of Africa and the Red Sea region, and its serious impacts on international peace and security" that came with recognising Somaliland.
Mauritania	In a statement by the Ministry of Foreign Affairs, Mauritania declared its "alignment with Arab, Islamic, and African positions, rejecting any recognition or support for attempts to undermine Somalia’s territorial unity."
Nigeria	Nigeria claimed in a joint official statement with Arab and Muslim countries that they condemned the "serious repercussions to peace and security in the Horn of Africa and the Red Sea region, and its serious impacts on international peace and security" that came with recognising Somaliland.
Oman	Oman claimed in a joint official statement with other Arab countries that they condemned the "serious repercussions to peace and security in the Horn of Africa and the Red Sea region, and its serious impacts on international peace and security" that came with recognising Somaliland.
Pakistan	Pakistan stated that recognition of Somaliland was detrimental to the peace and stability within the Horn of Africa, confirming its support for Somalia's territorial integrity.
Palestine	The foreign ministry of the State of Palestine expressed full support for Somalia's unity and sovereignty. The office of the president of Palestine, Mahmoud Abbas, alleged that Israel recognized Somaliland in a ploy to forcibly transfer Palestinian refugees there.
Qatar	Qatar officially supports the sovereignty, unity, and territorial integrity of the Federal Republic of Somalia. The Qatari Ministry of Foreign Affairs rejected any unilateral actions aimed at recognising or establishing parallel entities in Somalia, stating that such moves violate international law and undermine regional stability. Qatar has reaffirmed its full support for Somalia's internationally recognised government and its legitimate institutions, and has called on the international community to respect international law and United Nations resolutions concerning Somalia.
Russia	According to Dinar Gilmutdinov, senior counsellor at the Russian mission to the UN, Moscow is extremely concerned by Israel's decision to recognise Somaliland since it violates Somalia's sovereignty, territorial integrity, and unity.
Rwanda	Rwanda officially stated that it "fully aligns with the statements issued by the African Union and the East African Community in support of Somalia."
Saudi Arabia	Saudi Arabia has expressed "full support" for Somalia's sovereignty, unity, and territorial integrity.
Serbia	Serbia expressed full support to the territorial integrity and sovereignty of the Federal Republic of Somalia.
Sierra Leone	Sierra Leone's speaker at the UN Security Council on 29 December 2025 stated that respecting Somalia's territorial integrity was a "foundational obligations under the Charter and the bedrock of Africa’s stability and international peace and security".
Slovenia	Slovenia’s UN Ambassador, Samuel Zbogar, on 29 December 2025, during the UN Security Council meeting about the Somalilander question, responded to US representatives calling the different attitude between Palestinian and Somalilander independence a "double standard" by stating that whilst "Palestine is not part of any state", "Somaliland, [...] is a part of a UN member state, and recognising it goes against... the UN Charter."
Somalia	The Federal Republic of Somalia claims Somaliland as part of its sovereign territory.
South Africa	In 2011, the foreign minister of South Africa said that it would not recognise Somaliland and preferred that Somalia remain a single country. However, South Africa has stated that Somaliland fulfils the Montevideo Convention criteria for statehood and accepts the Somaliland passport. In 2025, South Africa opposed Israel's recognition of Somaliland as an independent state, claiming that it violated Somalia's sovereignty and geographical integrity.
South Korea	The South Korean UN ambassador, during the UN Security Council that took place on 29 December 2025, whilst not stating a direct condemnation of the recognition of Somaliland, stated that such actions "in order to be constructive" must be discussed diplomatically with the entities involved before being pursued.
South Sudan	Claims were made on 26 December 2025 by Somaliland media outlets, Fox News and The Independent that South Sudan was the second nation to recognise Somaliland after Israel. The following day, South Sudan's foreign minister was reported to have told their Somali counterpart that they were against "any actions that undermine the country’s territorial integrity".
Sudan	Sudan claimed in a joint official statement with other Arab countries that they condemned the "serious repercussions to peace and security in the Horn of Africa and the Red Sea region, and its serious impacts on international peace and security" that came with recognising Somaliland.
Sweden	The Ministry of Foreign Affairs stated that Sweden "upholds the principles of Somalia’s unity, sovereignty and territorial integrity".
Syria	Syria affirmed its "support for the unity of Somali territories".
Tanzania	In 2011, the foreign minister of Tanzania said that it would not recognise Somaliland and preferred that Somalia remain a single country.
Tunisia	In a statement released by the Ministry of Foreign Affairs, Tunisia reaffirmed its support for the stances taken by the African Union Commission, the League of Arab States, and the Organisation of Islamic Cooperation, which all denounced Israel's recognition of Somaliland.
Turkey	Turkey has emphasised "full support for the unity, sovereignty and territorial integrity of Somalia."
Ukraine	Foreign Ministry spokesperson Heorhii Tykhyi remarked that Ukraine reaffirms its support for Somalia's sovereignty and territorial integrity and cautions all states against acts that violate international law and could destabilise the area.
United Arab Emirates	Main article: Somaliland–United Arab Emirates relations The United Arab Emirates released a joint statement with the African Union on Somalia where both sides reaffirmed their support for Somalia’s sovereignty, territorial integrity, security and stability. In May 2026, however, it was reported that the UAE was allegedly lobbying Argentina, Dominican Republic, Eswatini and Zambia to recognise Somaliland alongside the UAE in a hypothetical future extension of recognition.
United Kingdom	Main article: Somaliland–United Kingdom relations The United Kingdom's government stated its support for Somalia's sovereignty and territorial integrity, while also officially opposing Somaliland's independence.
United States	Main article: Somaliland–United States relations The U.S. Department of State upholds the One Somalia policy of not recognizing Somaliland as of early 2026. U.S. president Donald Trump declined to recognize Somaliland in 2025 but referred to it as a separate country distinct from Somalia in late 2026. The United States, notwithstanding its own nonrecognition of Somaliland, defended Israel's recognition of Somaliland as a sovereign right.
Venezuela	Venezuela reiterated its rejection of "any unilateral action aimed at recognising separatist entities" within its borders and its "full and firm recognition" of Somalia's unity and sovereignty.
Yemen	The Presidential Leadership Council, which hold's Yemen's seat at the United Nations, claimed in a joint official statement with other Arab countries that they condemned the "serious repercussions to peace and security in the Horn of Africa and the Red Sea region, and its serious impacts on international peace and security" that came with recognising Somaliland. Abdul-Malik al-Houthi, the leader of the Houthi rebels, condemned Israel's recognition of Somaliland and threatened to attack any Israeli military presence in Somaliland.

== Positions taken by intergovernmental organisations ==
Name	Official position
African Union	On 26 December 2025, the African Union warned against any attempt to "undermine the unity, sovereignty, and territorial integrity of Somalia." However in 2005, an African Union factfinding mission to Somaliland concluded "The fact that the "union between Somaliland and Somalia was never ratified" and also malfunctioned when it went into action from 1960 to 1990, makes Somaliland's search for recognition historically unique and self-justified in African political history. Objectively viewed, the case should not be linked to the notion of "opening a Pandora’s box". As such, the AU should find a special method of dealing with this outstanding case."
Arab League	The Arab League has rejected "interference in Somalia's internal affairs."
European Union	The European Union reaffirmed the importance of respecting the unity, sovereignty and territorial integrity of Somalia.
East African Community	The East African Community stated that it opposed the idea of a State of Somaliland as it went against its ideal of a united, sole Somali state.
Gulf Cooperation Council	The GCC has declared support for Somalia's security, stability, sovereignty, and territorial integrity.
Intergovernmental Authority on Development	The Intergovernmental Authority on Development reiterated its firm commitment to the Federal Republic of Somalia’s unity, sovereignty, and territorial integrity.
Organisation of Islamic Cooperation	The Organisation of Islamic Cooperation affirmed its full solidarity with the Federal Republic of Somalia and its unwavering support for its sovereignty and territorial unity, as well as its unequivocal support for its legitimate institutions.

== See also ==
- Foreign relations of Somaliland
- Israel–Somaliland relations
