= Somaliland–United Kingdom relations =

- Somaliland: United Kingdom

Somaliland–United Kingdom relations refers to the relationship between the Republic of Somaliland and the United Kingdom of Great Britain and Northern Ireland. Somaliland maintains a representative (liaison) office in the United Kingdom, which in turn has a representative office in Hargeisa.

== History ==
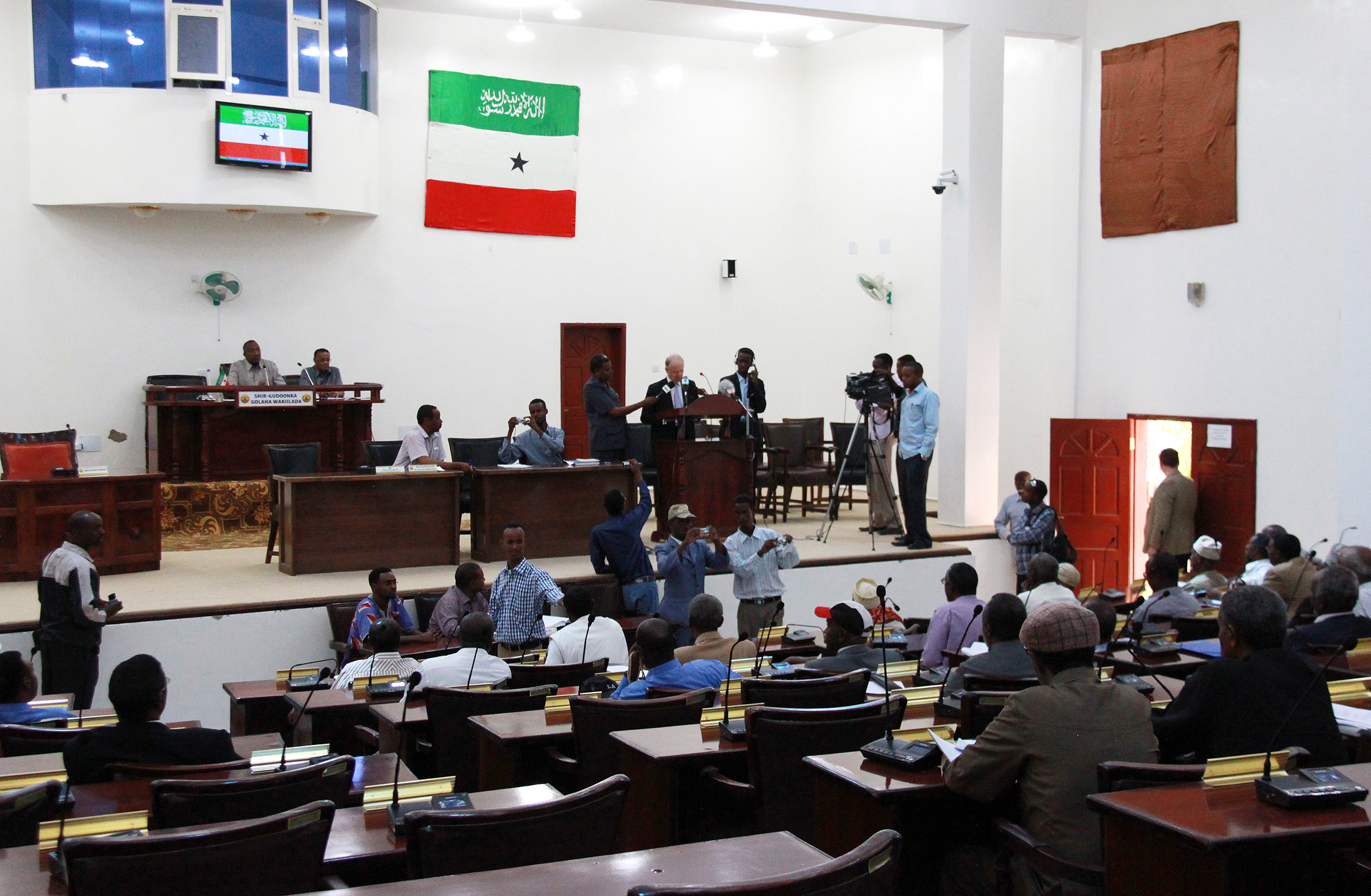
British Foreign Office Minister Henry Bellingham addressing the Somaliland Parliament, July 2011

In April 2014, the Sheffield City Council in the United Kingdom voted to recognise the right to self-determination of Somaliland, the second British city council to do so, with Bristol being the first. The gesture however was ceremonial and not legally binding. On 26 March 2015, Cardiff City Council followed suit and later on 18 May 2015, the UK Independence Party announced their support for the recognition of Somaliland. This was followed by the Conservative UK government's official opening of a British Office in Hargeisa, the capital of Somaliland. In July 2019, the Birmingham City Council recognised the right to self-determination of Somaliland, becoming the 5th in Britain. In 2020, the United Kingdom, Denmark and the Netherlands approved four agreements with the government of Somaliland to improve critical infrastructure to support economic growth. On 4 July 2023, Gavin Williamson proposed a bill to the UK Parliament that would require the United Kingdom to recognise the Republic of Somaliland.

In October 2025, Daily News Egypt reported that the United Kingdom, along with 20 other countries, was considering recognising Somaliland in the coming months.

== See also ==
- British Somaliland, a protectorate of the United Kingdom 1920-1960
- Foreign relations of Somaliland
- Foreign relations of the United Kingdom
