= Israel–Somalia relations =

- Israel: Somalia

There are currently no formal diplomatic relations between Israel and somalia because Somalia has never recognized Israel as an independent state.

== History ==
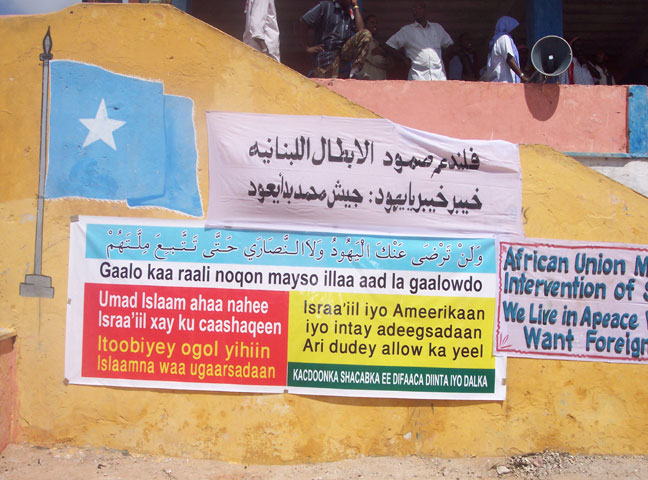
Islamic Courts Union rally against the 2006 Lebanon War, top banner reads: "Let us support the steadfastness of the Lebanese heroes"

Israel was one of the first countries to recognise the State of Somaliland's brief five-day independence in 1960, though the united Somali Republic it immediately merged into never recognized Israel. Israel later approached Somalia numerous times to establish diplomatic ties, but was repeatedly rebuffed. In 1974, Somalia joined the Arab League and complied with the Arab League boycott of Israel.

During the 1960s, Ethiopian emperor Haile Selassie sought support from Israel to counter Somali insurgents fighting for the independence of the Ogaden region and against the Somali Republic which was aiding them. High-ranking Israeli police officials helped establish special border police forces in the Ogaden. According to future Israeli PM Yitzhak Rabin, Selassie primarily wanted to discuss security problems related to the Somalis during talks with the Israelis. In a meeting with Israeli Defense Minister Moshe Dayan, Haile Selassie asserted that the Somali nationalist aspiration for a Greater Somalia was driven by Nasserite agitation and expressed hope to the Israelis that the Somali Republic itself would eventually be incorporated into the Ethiopian Empire.

During the Ogaden War between Somalia and Ethiopia from 1977 to 1978, Israeli Minister of Foreign Affairs Moshe Dayan publicly acknowledged that Tel Aviv was providing security assistance and arms to Ethiopia against the Somalis. Israeli support began after the Derg government led by Mengistu requested weapons, prompting Israel to consult with the United States before delivering arms via cargo planes. Several Arab states also accused Israel of direct involvement in the conflict. Israel reportedly provided cluster bombs, napalm and were also allegedly flying combat aircraft for Ethiopia. Israeli Prime Minister Menachim Begin urged American president Jimmy Carter to help repel the Somali's during the war.

After defeating a coalition of warlords and ascending to power in 2006, the Islamic Courts Union (ICU), then the de facto government across much of Somalia, was accused by the United Nations of dispatching 700 troops to fight against the IDF alongside Hezbollah forces during the 2006 invasion of Lebanon. While the Islamic Courts had demonstrated serious hostility against Israel and held rallies in support of Hezbollah fighters during the summer of 2006, they called on the UN to stop publishing "baseless propaganda". The Israelis claimed that they knew of an Islamic Courts Union presence in Lebanon, while Hezbollah rejected the claims as "incorrect and silly". Observers drew parallels between the UN's allegations and the accusations made by the United States leading up to the 2003 invasion of Iraq. During the 2006 invasion of Somalia, the ICU accused Mossad of supporting Somali warlords and assisting the Ethiopian regime change effort.

Israeli Prime Minister Benjamin Netanyahu reportedly met with the head of the Federal Government of Somalia, President Hassan Sheikh Mohamud in Nairobi, Kenya in July 2016, which was the first high-level meeting between the two countries. Somali President Mohamed Abdullahi Mohamed refused to meet Israeli Prime Minister Benjamin Netanyahu in 2017 during a visit to Kenya, at an African Heads of State meeting in Nairobi. Many in Somalia support Palestine and oppose normalization with Israel. However, Somalia abstained for the first time in history in a March 2019 United Nations Human Rights Council resolution calling for Israel's withdrawal from the Golan Heights.

Hassan Sheikh Mohamud returned to the Somali presidency in 2022 and his government allegedly held consultations with parliament regarding the establishment of ties with Israel.

Shortly after the outbreak of the Gaza War, Somali Prime Minister Hamza Abdi Barre declared in November 2023 that Hamas was a liberation organization and publicly expressed support for the group. He declared at a ceremony held at the National Theatre in Mogadishu, "...they want to convince us to label Hamas as a terrorist organization. We don't say it, and we don't accept it,"

Israel became the first UN member state to formally recognize Somaliland on 26 December 2025. Somaliland had been an unrecognized state after declaring independence from Somalia in 1991 until this decision. The Somali government issued a statement condemning the Israeli government's decision.

In April 2026, the Somali government condemned Israel for violating "...Somalia's sovereignty, unity, and territorial integrity."

During an interview in October 2026, Somali President Hassan Sheikh Mohamud declared that Somalia would never accept an Israeli presence "under any circumstances" and stated that Israeli plans in the Somali territories were part of the project for a Greater Israel. He further labelled Israel a "destabilizing force" that did not abide by international law.

== See also ==
- Foreign relations of Israel
- Foreign relations of Somalia
- Israel–Somaliland relations
- History of the Jews in Somalia
