= Israel–Libya relations =

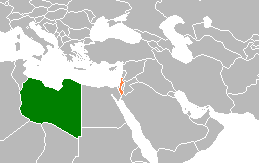

- Libya: Israel

Israel–Libya relations describes the relations between Israel and Libya. While there have been no formal diplomatic agreements between Israel and Libya since Libya's independence, there have been some notable events and developments in their relationship over the years. One of the main reasons for Libya's antagonism towards Israel has been its support for the Palestinian cause. Libya, under the rule of Muammar Gaddafi, was a staunch supporter of the Palestinian cause and provided aid and support to various Palestinian militant groups.

== History ==
In the years before the declaration of Libya's independence (in 1951), there was an extensive operation to bring Libyan Jews to Israel, Israeli representatives stayed in Tripoli and conducted aliyah operations there, aliyah activists obtained the consent of the country's leaders to continue their activities provided they served as Jewish Agency emissaries. The Libyan government, however, after Libya's independence, closed the Ministry of Aliyah, expelled the activists and did not allow Israeli ships to visit its ports.

In a 1951 vote at the United Nations on the inclusion of Libya to the Organization, Israel voted in favor of Libyan admission to the United Nations, but a few years later Libya joined the Arab League and the Arab boycott of Israel and was among the leaders of the opposing Israeli voice.

== Post 1967 relations ==
Colonel Raphael Eitan (who later became Israel Defense Forces' chief of staff), carried out a raid on Beirut airport during operations against the Palestine Liberation Organization. In response, French president Charles de Gaulle felt as though Israel had disrespected France, and ordered a full arms embargo on Israel. Due to the embargo, the 50 Mirage 5 aircraft, which was developed in cooperation with Israel, was sent to Libya instead. In 1969, de Gaulle retired and Israel was hopeful that France's new president Georges Pompidou would bring about better relations, but Pompidou continued the weapons embargo, straining relations between the two countries once again.

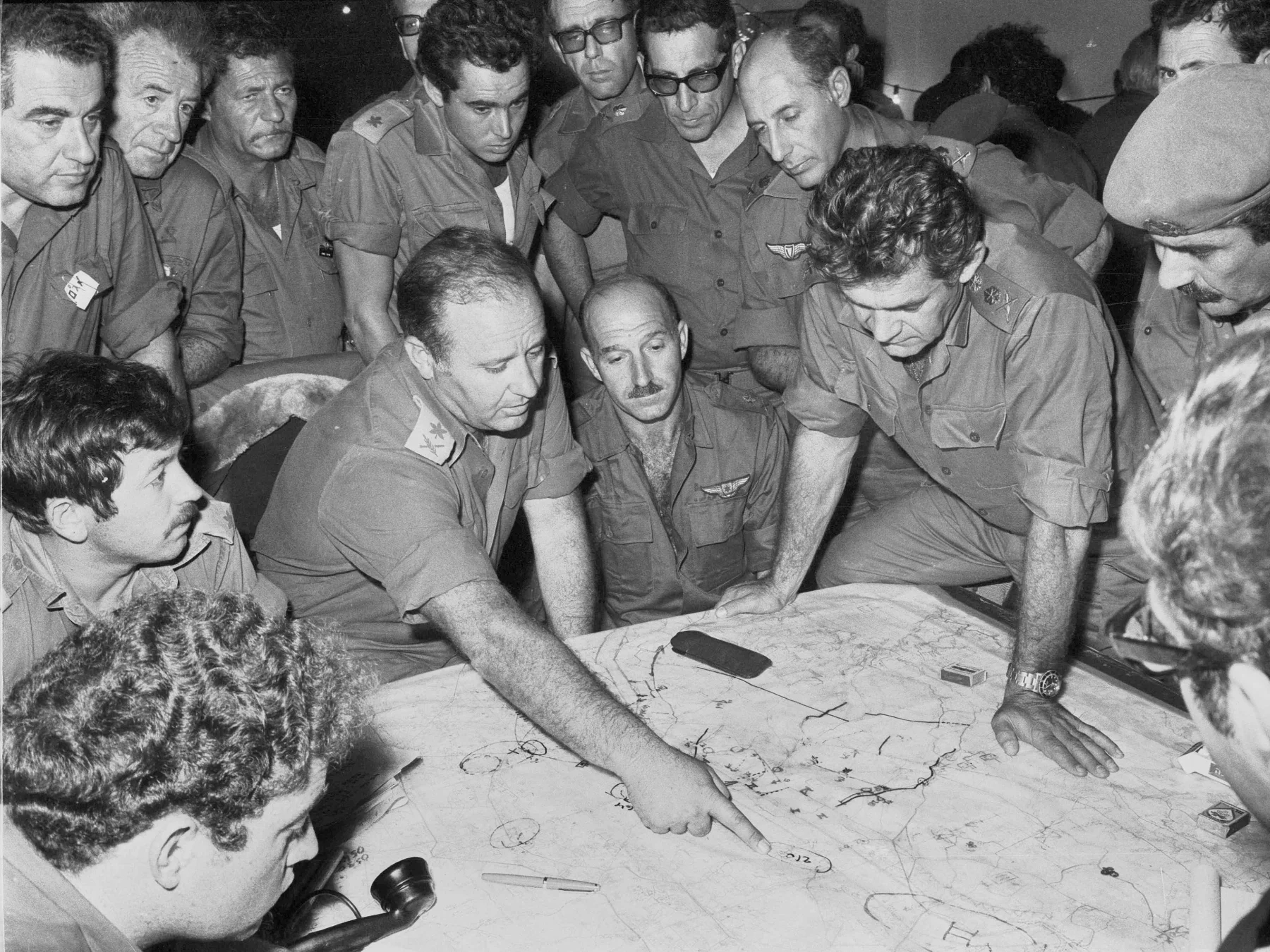
Yom Kippur War 1973

In February 1973, the Israeli Air Force shot down the passenger plane, Libyan Arab Airlines Flight 114 in the lobby. Israeli forces had mistakenly categorized the aircraft as a security threat. The plane's interception occurred after it accidentally penetrated Israeli airspace over northern Sinai Peninsula, an area that was under Israeli control at the time. As a result of the plane crash, 108 passengers and crew were killed. In response, Libyan leader Muammar Gaddafi told the Egyptian president Anwar Sadat that he intended to organize a retaliatory event in Haifa, Israel. During this time, Sadat was covertly preparing for the Yom Kippur War and calmed Gaddafi down. He expressed that such a Libyan attack would harm the cooperation of Arab nations to launch a unified strike against Israel. When the bodies of the victims of the Libyan Arab Airlines Flight 114 arrived in Libya, riots erupted in Tripoli and Benghazi. Although Sadat had managed to convince Gaddafi to refrain from direct military retaliation, Gaddafi nonetheless attempted to retaliate by other means. The month after the incident, he offered Black September $10 million to blow up an El Al plane with passengers on board.

During the Yom Kippur War, Libyan leader Muammar Gaddafi sent a large sending force to Egypt in order to assist it in its war against Israel. The Expeditionary Force included armored forces, artillery and 2 Mirage 5 squadrons that took an active part in the fighting on the southern front. When Libyan leader Muammar Gaddafi realized that King Hussein of Jordan had rejected requests by Arab leaders to join the war and attack Israel from the east, he began to insult him and called on the Jordanian people to revolt and join the war on their own.

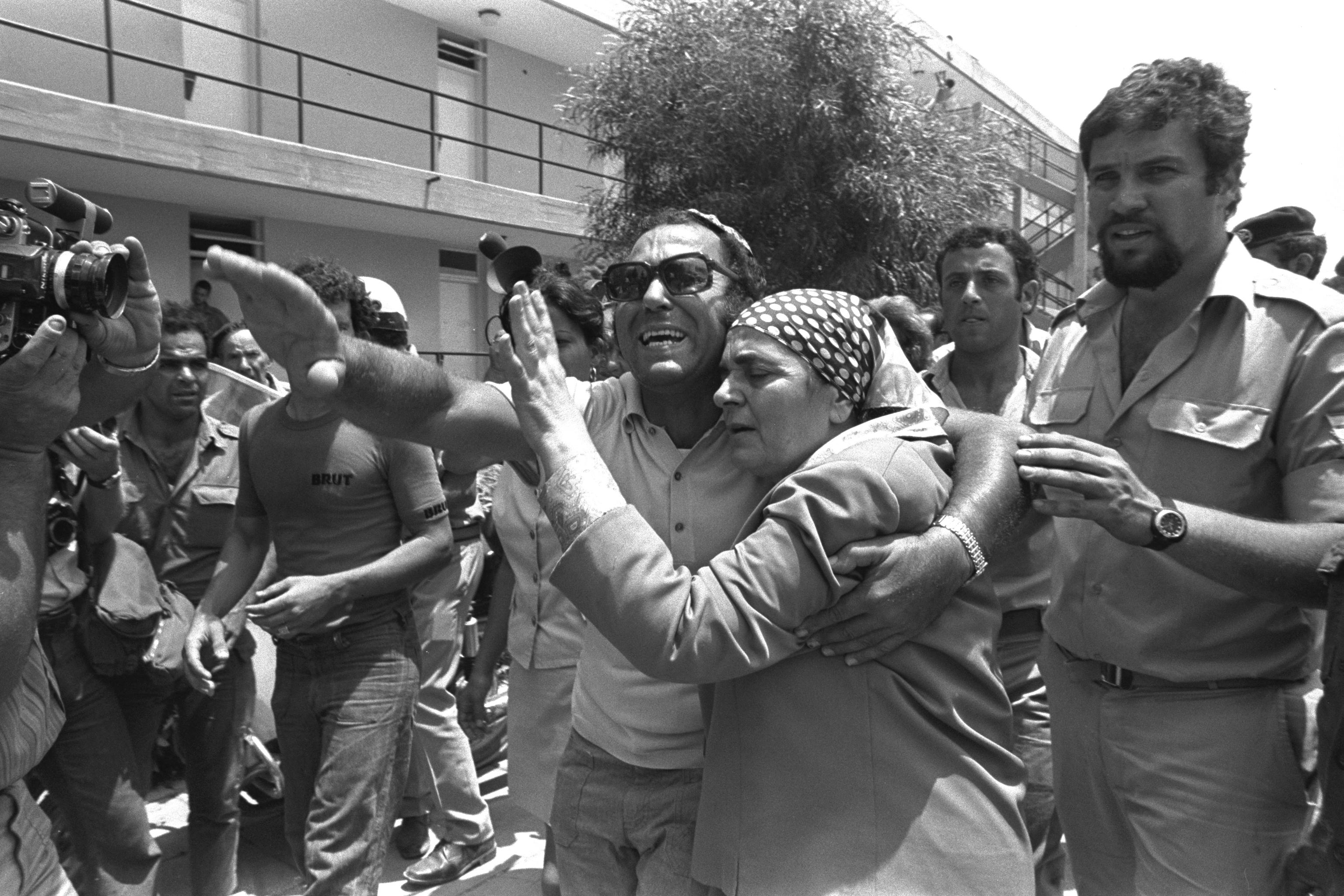
A family reunited after Operation Entebbe 1976

In 1976, Libya assisted in the hijacking of an Air France passenger plane by allowing the aircraft to refuel in Benghazi. The hijackers were eliminated and the passengers of the plane were released in Operation Entebbe.

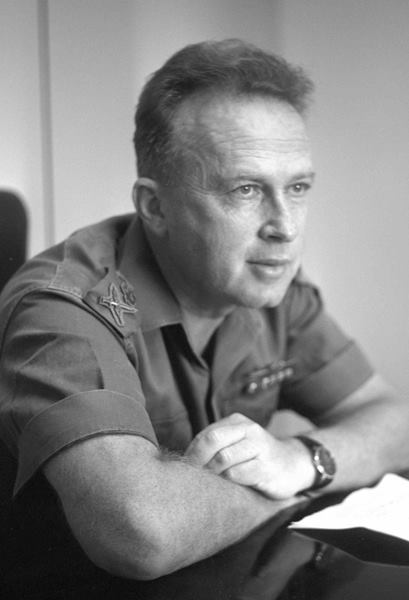
Yitzhak Rabin

In May 1993, as a gesture aimed at improving ties with Israel, Gaddafi sent a delegation of 192 Libya pilgrims to holy sites Jerusalem, though the trip was ultimately cut short after the pilgrims expressed criticism of Israel during their trip. It was reported that Gaddafi himself wished to visit Israel at the time, with Israeli prime minister Yitzhak Rabin and Israeli foreign minister Shimon Peres initially stating that he would be welcome.

== Gaddafi's alignment with Palestine Against Israel ==
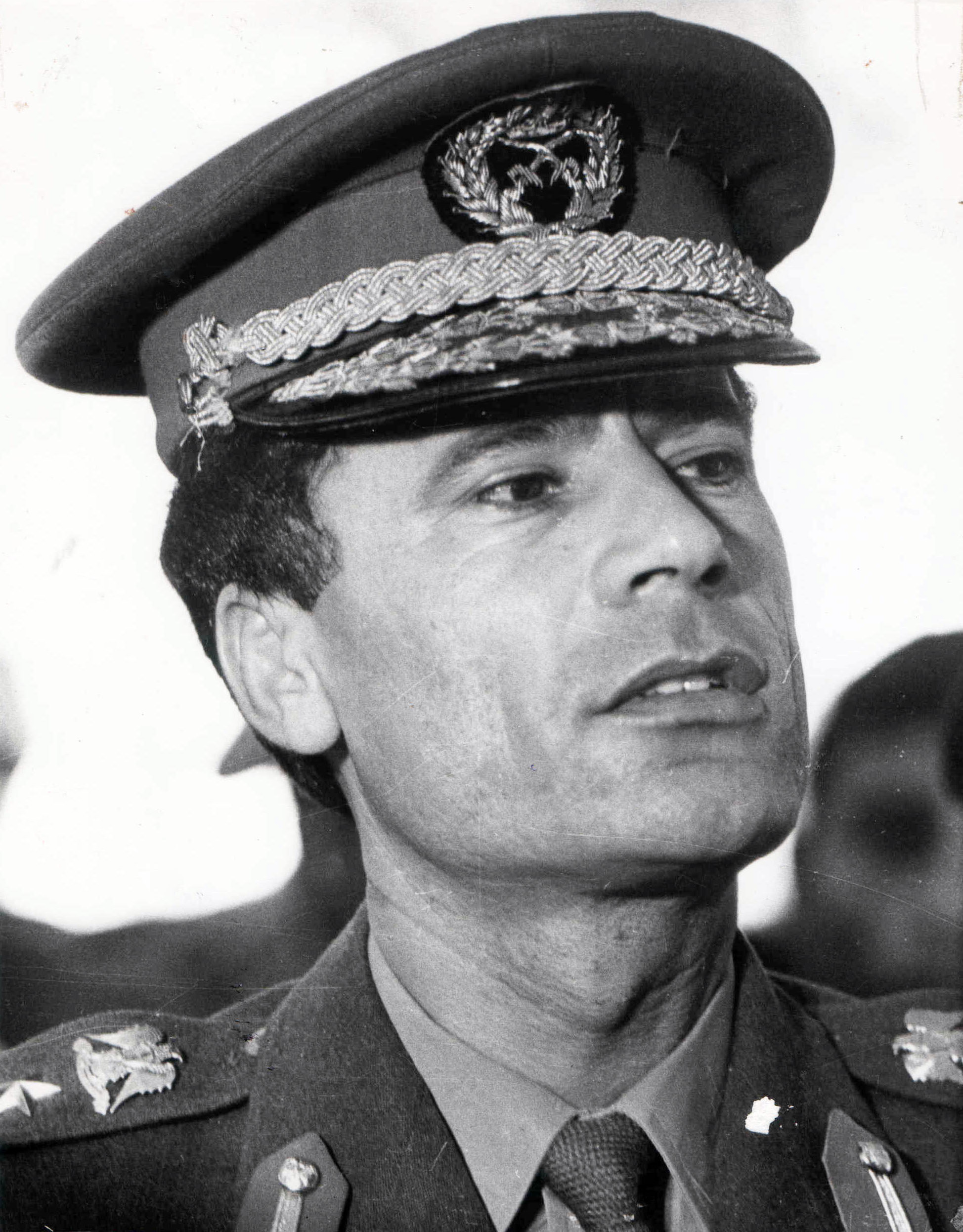
Muammar Gaddafi

On April 1, 2002: Libyan leader Gaddafi delivered a speech that called for a Pan-Arab war against the state of Israel's existence. He claimed that, "thousands of Libyans are ready to defend the Palestinian people." He spoke directly to other Arab leaders demanding that they open their borders to allow Libyans to march into Palestine, to join the Palestinian uprising. In this speech, Gaddafi expressed he would not recognize Israel as a state. He expressed that Libya would only recognize a Palestinian state, one that stretched from the Jordan River to the Mediterranean sea.

Before Gaddafi's coup which led him to power, he was an army colonel. During his years in the army, he became angered hearing the news that the Arab countries (Egypt, Syria, and Jordan) had lost to Israel during the Six-Day War. Gaddafi felt embarrassed in his identity as a Libyan nationalist, that the Libyan leader during the Six-Day War, King Mohammed El Senussi, did not back Egypt militarily or politically. He felt as though his vision of a unified Pan-Arabist front had been destroyed by the King. Gaddafi viewed Egypt's president, Gamal Abdel-Nassar, as a role model for Pan-Arabist ideology. He viewed Nassar as having developed an anti-imperialist sovereign Egypt. Gaddafi viewed Nassar as his role model. Gaddafi had risen to power through mirroring Nassar's rise to power, known as his Free Officers coup.

Having recently gained power, Gaddafi relied on promoting Palestinian nationalism as a means to gain respect, relevance, and support from the larger Arab world. Gaddafi used the Palestinian Issue to legitimize his coup d'état which overthrew Libya's monarchy. If Libya took a Pan-Arab stance against imperialist powers similar to Egypt, then his leadership style as an anti-imperialist nationalist, would appear just. During Egypt's involvement in the War of Attrition, Gaddafi's focus on portraying Zionism as an extension of imperialism, was a strategic move to place Libya onto a global stage and to be noticed by Nassar.

== Libya's approach to Pan-Arabism and Palestinian nationalism ==
In September 1970, following Nasser's death, Egypt's regime was placed under Anwar al-Sadat. Gaddafi detested Sadat because he rejected Libyan involvement in Egyptian affairs and was against Gaddafi's desire to further Nasserism. Gaddafi now exerted even more effort to align with the Palestinian struggle as an attempt to become the new visionary of Pan-Arabism. Around this time, Gaddafi expressed that the Israel-Palestine conflict was unresolvable. He exclaimed that Israel must be destroyed and that, "the arms struggle [is] the only course left for the Arab nation to liberate Palestine."

Gaddafi encouraged acts of terrorism against Israeli civilians. Gaddafi funded the Black September Organization. This organization was responsible for the 1972 massacre of Israeli athletes at the Munich Olympic Games. Gaddafi had the killed militants' bodies flown to Libya and held a martyrs funeral in their honor.

The Egyptians and Syrians concealed their war plans from Gaddafi before the launch of the Yom Kippur War. Gaddafi, angered at not being informed, expressed a different stance on the war than the Syrians and Egyptians. He said that the Egyptian and Syrian effort to merely, "take back the territories conquered by Israel in 1967 [was not as extensive as the Libyan goal] to free the Palestinians from the Zionist yoke."

Map of Libya and Egypt 1977

As Libyan–Egyptian relations were strained beginning in 1973, and escalating in 1977 with the Egyptian-Libyan War, Gaddafi felt himself becoming increasingly alienated by the Arab world. Gaddafi's relationship to Palestine was illustrated by a symbolic indication of support from Libya to Palestinians. In August 1977, 500 Palestinian commandos from Lebanon arrived in Libya, "to join Libyan troops along the border with Egypt." Gaddafi's move was an effort to maintain relevance in the larger Arab world. He continued to maintain close ties with the Palestinians, notably with Yasser Arafat, which allowed for Libyan political significance in the Arab community.

Previously, Gaddafi had supported Yasser Arafat and his group, Fatah, over more extremist or Marxist Palestinian groups. However, in 1978, Gaddafi's relationship with Arafat had become strained. Gaddafi found Arafat to be too moderate. Gaddafi yearned to align with a more violent Palestinian front. As Gaddafi turned away from Arafat by severing ties and halting his funding, he began to support militias like the Popular Front for the Liberation of Palestine, Popular Front for the Liberation of Palestine – General Command, the Democratic Front for the Liberation of Palestine, As-Sa'iqa, the Palestinian Popular Struggle Front, and the Abu Nidal Organization. In an effort to alienate Arafat from other Palestinian fronts, Gaddafi urged radical Palestinian organizations to join against Israel, promising to support Palestine through military funding.

Relations between Arafat and Gaddafi improved briefly in 1981, with Libya reportedly supplying the Palestine Liberation Organization with military equipment. In 1982, when a political settlement concerning the Palestine Liberation Organization's evacuation from Beirut was possible, Libya advised them to "commit suicide rather than accept shame", causing relations with Arafat to deteriorate further. Throughout 1983, Libya supported anti-Arafat dissidents in the Fatah, providing Gaddafi with an opportunity to challenge Arafat's authority. When the Palestinian uprising began in 1987, Gaddafi declared support for the cause and allocated monthly aid of $4 million to the uprising, highlighting Libya's devotion to the Palestinian cause.

During the summer of that year, Gaddafi made an announcement that the Libyan Jamahiriya would pay the striking Palestinian employees of the Israel Civil Administration in the West Bank and Gaza $1 million per month.

== Libya's stance on Palestine–Israel peace agreements ==
Gaddafi was against Jewish migration to the state of Israel. He rejected the immigration of Jews from the former Soviet Union to Israel, claiming it was at the expense of the people of Palestine. Gaddafi warned that Jewish immigration might lead to the expulsion of more Palestinians. Furthermore, he suggested that the Jews remain in their present countries or be given an alternative homeland in the Baltic republics, Alaska, or in Alsace-Lorraine.

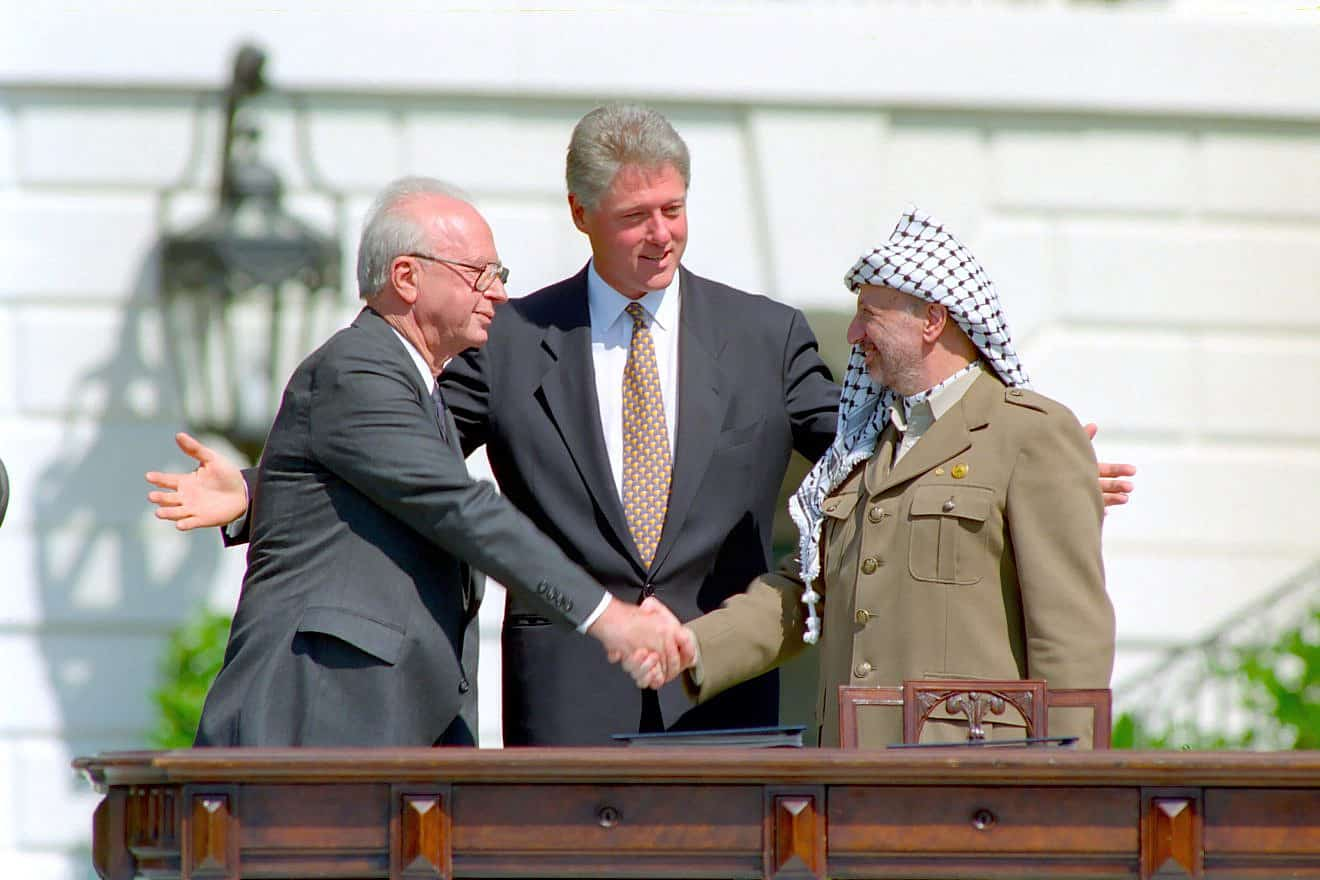
Yitzhak Rabin and Yasser Arafat agreeing to Oslo at the White House 1993

The Oslo Accords had been signed between Israel and the [alestine Liberation Organization in September 1993, which detailed a political solution to the territorial conflict. Gaddafi's response to the Oslo Accords was to state that the conflict could only be resolved by the return of all Palestinian people to Palestine. Having shifted in his post Six-Day War view on Israel, Gaddafi now called for the establishment of a democratic state of both Jews and Palestinians, supervised by the UN.

Libya condemned the Gaza–Jericho Agreement signed in May 1994 between Israel and the Palestine Liberation Organization, stating that the PLO had betrayed the Arab nation in its signing of the agreement. Gaddafi argued that the problem was not between Palestinians and Israelis, but rather between Arabs and a Zionist enemy.

Libya under the leadership of Gaddafi took a militant stance against Israel and supported the actions of Hamas, a Palestinian militia group in Gaza. Gaddafi refused to recognize Israel and rejected any political settlement with them, calling the conflict a matter of Israeli existence rather than a territory dispute. He also saw the 1994 peace treaty between Israel and Jordan as a push against Palestinian self-determination. Gaddafi viewed the Palestinian Authority, under Arafat's leadership as disloyal to the Palestinian cause and took punitive measures against them and Egypt and the US, their supporters. Libya took an anti peace approach to the Palestine-Israel conflict. To harm the peace process, Gaddafi expelled 5,000 Palestinians from Libya.

Gaddafi expelled Palestinians living in Libya because he believed that they were no longer refugees, as the Palestine Liberation Organization had established a Palestinian government. However, Egypt and Lebanon refused to admit the deportees, leading to many seeking refuge in makeshift camps on the Libyan-Egyptian border or being stranded at sea. Libya attempted to mitigate the action's failure and negative impact by claiming that the move was voluntary as the Palestinians' desired to return to their homeland. Libya launched a propaganda filled campaign to repair Gaddafi's image by portraying the Palestinians as grateful to him for helping return them to their land. The presence of around 1,000 Palestinians in terrible conditions along the Libyan-Egyptian border, continued to harm Gaddafi politically and to effect his image in the Arab world. In late October 1995, to save his image, Gaddafi temporarily suspended the expulsion of the Palestinians.

== Gaddafi's softening stance against Israel ==
In 1999 after the suspension of UN sanctions, the Palestinian cause was not a top priority for Tripoli, and Gaddafi shifted his focus towards improving Libya's diplomatic position in Europe and attracting Western investors. In order to gain respectability in the West, Gaddafi softened his stance on the Israeli-Palestinian conflict and granted the Palestine Liberation Organization office in Tripoli the status of sole diplomatic representative of Palestinian affairs in Libya. He also instructed Palestinian opposition factions in Libya to suspend their activities and cooperate with the PLO office.

During the second Palestinian uprising in 2000, Gaddafi anti-Israel rhetoric intensified as he expressed that Israel was seeking to take over Arab countries and control oil supplies in the Gulf with the help of the USA. He even made claims that Mecca and Medina were Israeli occupied territories.

Gaddafi believed that the Palestinians needed economic and military aid to resist Israeli occupation. In the early 2000s, Libya provided humanitarian aid. In 2002, Libya provided significant aid to the Palestinians during the escalation of the conflict, but they believed that more support was needed from other Arab countries. Gaddafi has long positioned himself as a champion of the Palestinian cause and supported armed struggle as the solution to the conflict. Despite this militant ideology, Libya refrained from active involvement in the conflict, even when the Palestinians took up armed struggle. This conflicted Gaddafi's earlier stance regarding the conflict. In essence, Gaddafi solely cared about Palestine's right to self-determination to reap political benefits from a self-projected image as the devoted guardian of Palestinian rights.

== Peace talks between Libya and Israel ==
During the 2000s, Libya promoted the Isratin peace proposal, which would involve a binational state including both Jews and Palestinians.

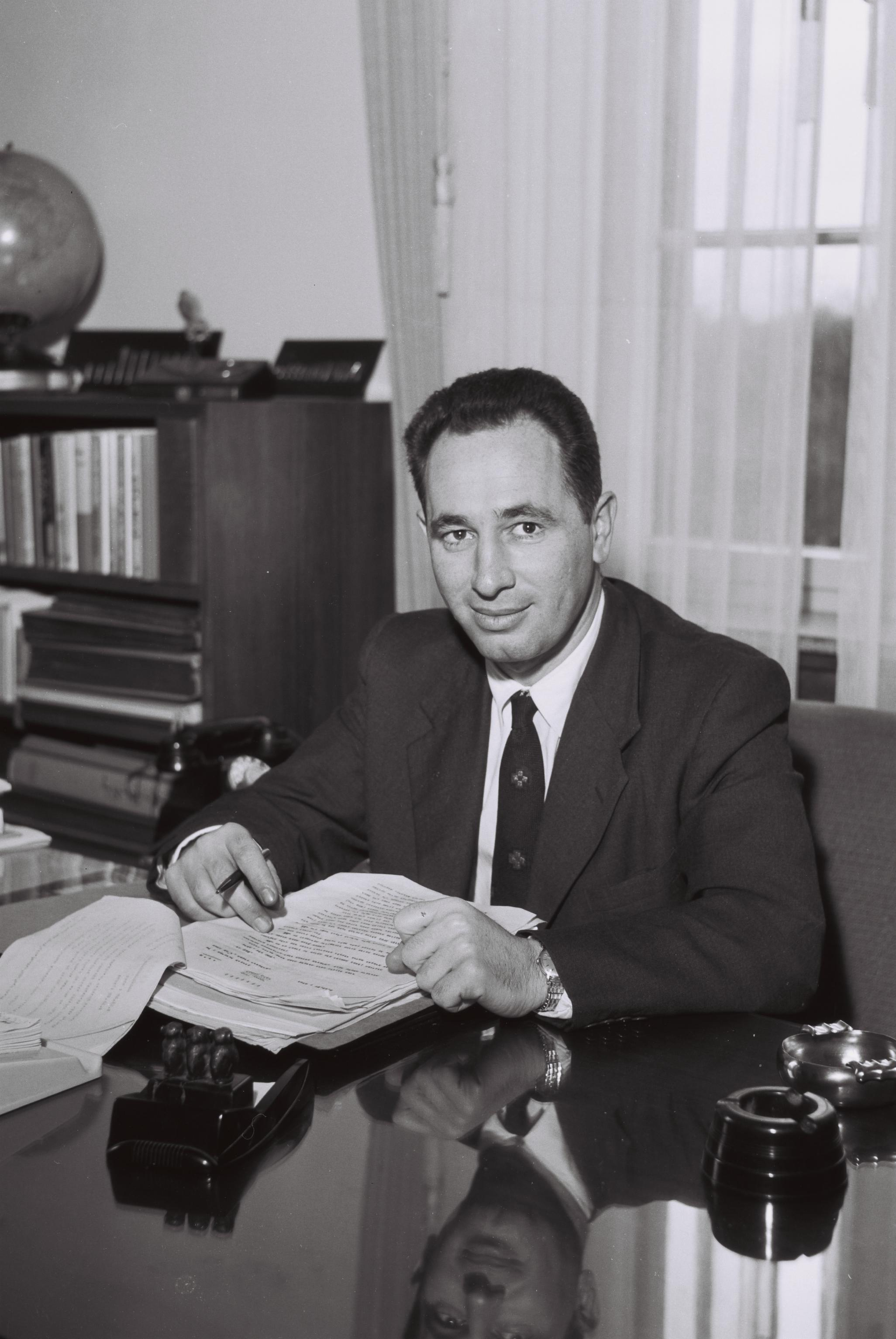
Shimon Peres 1963

In 2007, Israeli president Shimon Peres reportedly expressed interest in having Gaddafi mediate peace talks with the Palestinians in Jordan. However, although Gaddafi agreed to take part, he made his participation conditional upon breaking Israel–Jordan relations should the talks fail and be leaked to the media, which were unacceptable terms to Jordan.

In 2011, Saif al-Islam Gaddafi conducted talks on behalf of Libya with Israeli minister Ayoob Kara regarding Libyan recognition of Israel, including assistance with securing the release of Gilad Shalit from Hamas custody and a visit by Gaddafi to Israel, though these talks did not conclude due to the overthrow of the Gaddafi government during the First Libyan Civil War. It was later reported by Haaretz that Saif al-Islam had maintained informal dialogue with Israel during the Libyan Arab Jamahiriya on "diplomatic and humanitarian issues".

== Present day ==
In November 2023, the Libyan Parliament voted unanimously to add new provisions to Law No. 62 of 1957 criminalizing "relations with Israel".
