= Michael Lotem =

Israeli diplomat

Michael Lotem is an Israeli diplomat, the first Israeli diplomat appointed as Israel's ambassador to Somaliland. He previously served as a roving ambassador for economic affairs in Africa. During his diplomatic career, he served as Israel's ambassador to Kenya, Azerbaijan, and Kazakhstan.

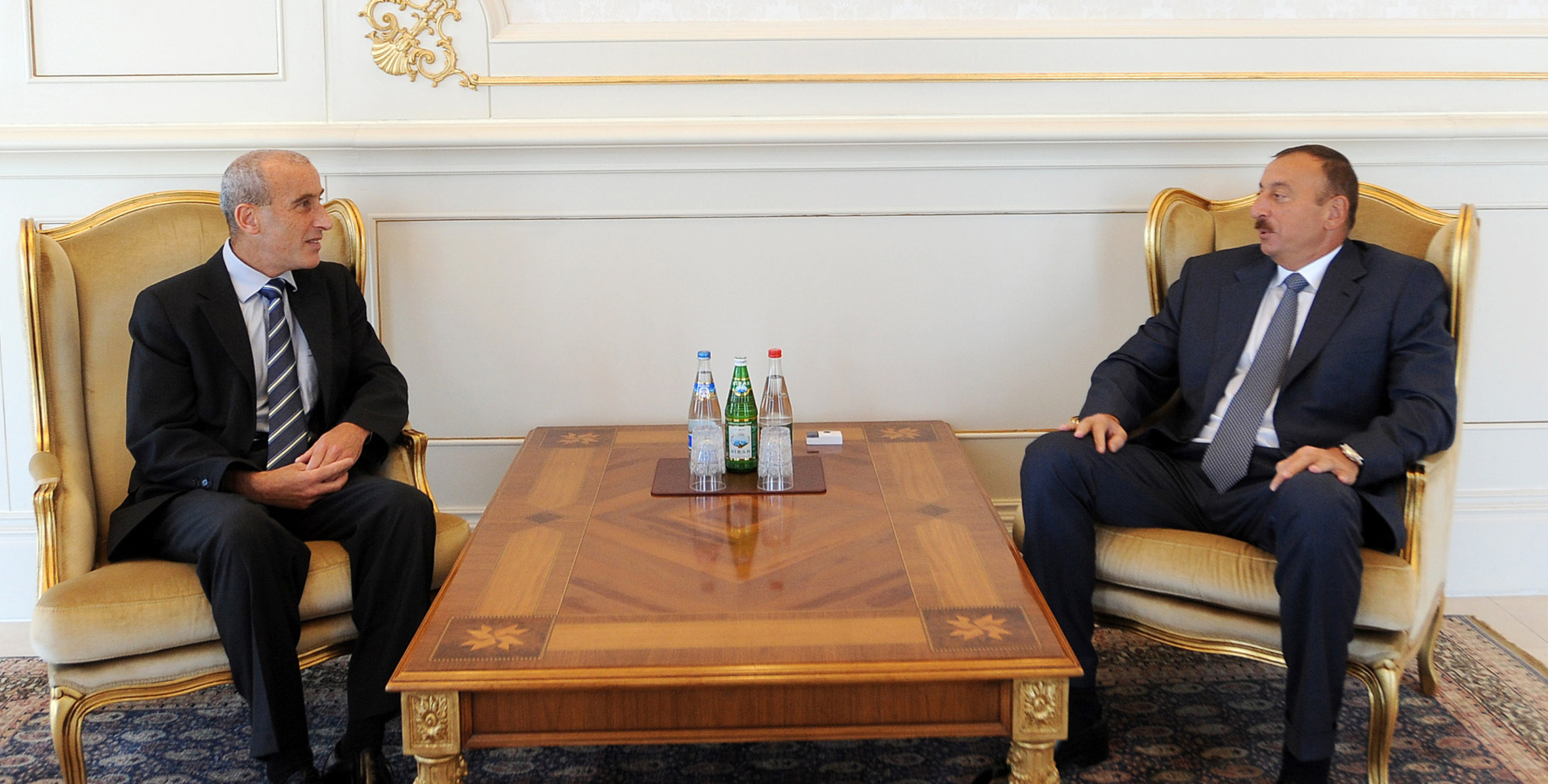
Ilham Aliyev (right), president of Azerbaijan receives the outgoing Israeli Ambassador, Michael Lotem, at the end of his diplomatic mission in Azerbaijan, 2012

== Career ==
In 2004, he served as Israel's ambassador to Kazakhstan and Kyrgyzstan.

In 2012, while serving as ambassador to Azerbaijan, he survived an assassination attempt. The attempt was carried out by Iran in retaliation for the killing of four Iranian nuclear scientists.

In 2013, he served as the Ministry of Foreign Affairs’ special envoy for energy affairs. In 2014, he was appointed consul general in Saint Petersburg.

In 2021, he was appointed Israel's ambassador to Kenya and non-resident ambassador to Uganda, Malawi, Seychelles, and Tanzania. During his tenure, he signed a memorandum of understanding between Israel and Kenya in the field of energy, aimed at deepening cooperation between the two countries.

In April 2026, following the recognition of its independence, he was appointed Israel's ambassador to Somaliland, initially as a non-resident ambassador.
