= Israel–Somaliland relations =

- Israel: Somaliland

Envoy
- Ambassador Michael Lotem: Ambassador; Mohamed Hagi

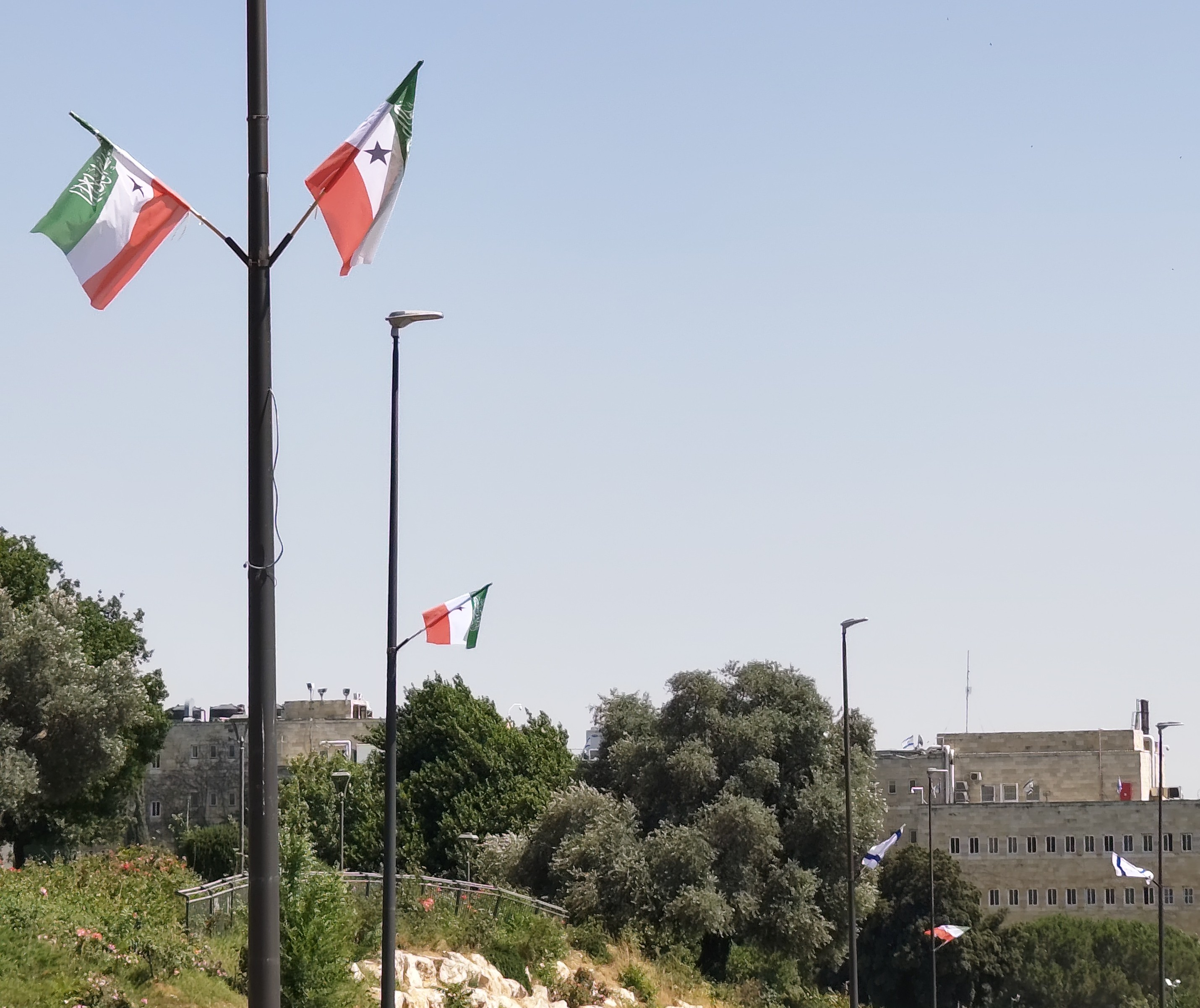
Flags of Somaliland in Jerusalem, June 2026

On 26 December 2025, the State of Israel became the first country and UN member state to officially recognise the Republic of Somaliland as a sovereign and independent state. Somaliland regards itself as the legal successor of the State of Somaliland, whose five-day independence in 1960 was also recognised by Israel and 34 other countries. The entirety of modern Somaliland's territory is claimed but not controlled by Somalia, which does not officially recognise Israel.

Somaliland's first ambassador to Israel, Mohamed Hagi, was appointed in February 2026, while Israel's first ambassador to Somaliland, Michael Lotem, was appointed in April 2026. In June 2026, Somaliland opened its embassy to Israel in Jerusalem.

== History ==
=== Background ===
Israel was one of the first countries to recognise the State of Somaliland's brief five-day independence following the end of British rule in 1960.

=== Somaliland Independence ===
In 1990, Israel was the only country to denounce the Isaaq genocide —a systematic, state-sponsored genocide of Isaaq civilians between 1987 and 1989 by the Somali Democratic Republic— to the UN, expressing concern and bringing the issue to the world's attention. In 1995, then President of Somaliland, Ibrahim Egal, wrote a letter to then Prime Minister of Israel, Yitzhak Rabin seeking to establish diplomatic ties between the two countries. Egal spoke of the need to jointly counter Islamism in the region. According to Abdirahman Tuur, the first president of Somaliland, Egal had sought to form a relationship with Israel in hopes of gaining recognition from the United States.

In February 2001, it was also reported Somaliland was looking towards Israel after Saudi Arabia banned imports of livestock from the country due to Rift Valley fever. During this time several Israeli businessmen were also in the nation's capital Hargeisa. However, President Kahin, who succeeded Egal, is reported to have avoided approaching Israel to prevent straining fragile relations with the Arabs and Muslim world, which it heavily relies on for its livestock trade.

In 2005, Somaliland President Dahir Riyale Kahin declared in an interview with Al-Jazeera that he was free to establish relations with Israel and that no one could stop him. In February 2010, Yigal Palmor, then Spokesman for Israel's Foreign Ministry, referenced Egal's 1995 letter to Rabin about rising Islamic fundamentalism and the strategic importance of Bab al-Mandab to the Red Sea and Indian Ocean, and noted that both Somaliland and Israel were politically isolated. That same month Palmor was quoted in the Haaretz Daily that his government was ready to recognise Somaliland again.

In 2019, reports emerged alleging that Mohamed Haji Adan, then-Minister of Constitutional and Parliamentary Affairs, had conducted a clandestine visit to Israel. Adan subsequently issued a firm denial of these claims. In August 2020, Somaliland expressed its support for the Israel–United Arab Emirates normalisation agreement.

In 2022, Somaliland President Muse Bihi Abdi told American officials that he was making overtures towards Israel. The Times of Israel reported that same year that the defence minister of Somaliland had attended a conference organised by the Israeli embassy in France. The Somaliland government denied the reports. Africa Intelligence observed that in February 2022 the Israelis had dispatched several teams to inspect runways built by the Soviet Union in Somaliland.

=== Relations during the Gaza War ===
According to Israeli intelligence officials, Mossad spent years cultivating discreet and high-level relationships in Somaliland, in order to pave the way for diplomatic recognition. Bashir Goth, Somaliland's representative to the United States, characterised the relationship as long-standing, stating that "Israel was always on our side, on our radar."

On 17 October 2024, it was reported that Israel and Somaliland were discussing the possibility of establishing an Israeli military base in Somaliland to counter the Houthis in Yemen. These talks were allegedly mediated by the United Arab Emirates, which had offered to fund the base's construction.

In March 2025, it was reported that Israel and the United States had approached Somaliland (along with Somalia and Sudan), proposing the countries take in refugees from the Gaza Strip, amid the Gaza war. Multiple analysts from various groups in Somaliland have stated that the Somaliland government accepting the transfer of Palestinians would likely cause severe discontent and political violence. Both Somalia and Somaliland denied receiving any proposal from Israel or the United States to resettle Gazans. Jethro Norman at the Danish Institute for International Studies told Al Jazeera that government acceptance would likely give a significant rhetorical victory to Al-Shabaab and ISIS as they already frame their insurgencies as legitimate rebellion against "Crusader–Zionist" Western schemes.

Amid the reports of Somaliland being approached by the Israeli government and the United States government, Somaliland's foreign minister told KAN, Israel's public broadcaster, in a written statement, "We are open to discussion on any matter, but we do not want to speculate on matters that have not yet been discussed. All countries that are interested in discussing certain issues with us must first establish working relations with us and open diplomatic missions in Somaliland."

Recognition of Somaliland received the backing of prominent Republican Party and AIPAC politicians in the United States due to potential engagement with Israel, with the Israeli government indicating that negotiations with Somaliland were ongoing in September.

=== Recognition ===
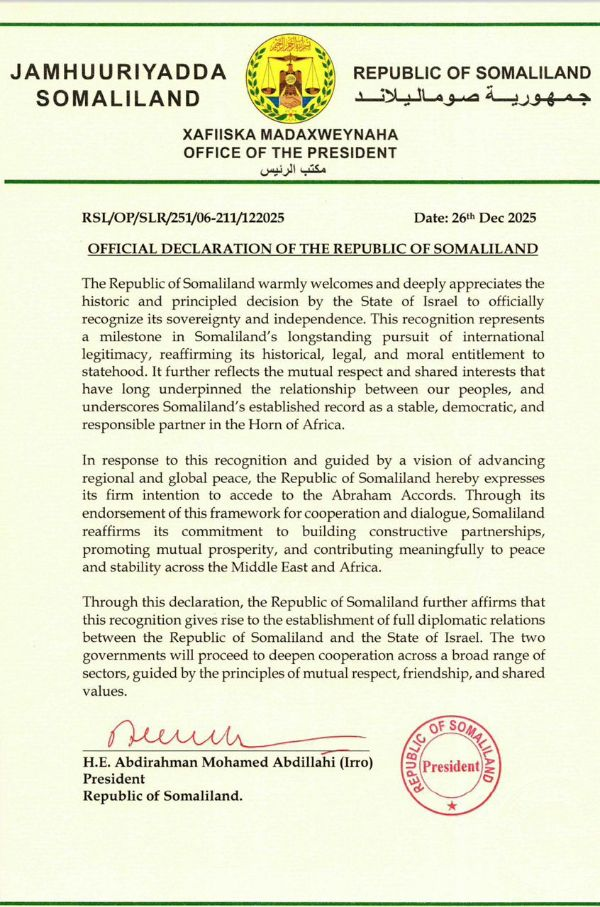
Official declaration of the government of the Republic of Somaliland accepting the recognition of Israel and its adherence to the Abraham Accords.

==== Reaction to Israel's recognition of Somaliland ====
Thousands gathered in a supportive demonstration in the capital Hargeisa after Israel officially announced the recognition. They chanted "Victory for Somaliland!" and the Israel and Somaliland flags were broadcast live on TV stations. Many waved Somaliland flags, wore national colours, and chanted slogans expressing pride and victory. Similar gatherings took place in towns such as Burao and Gabiley.

Counterprotests were held in the city of Borama, Awdal with some demonstrators waving Palestinian flags and chanted slogans such as, "Free, Free Palestine" and "We don't want separatists".

Taiwan's Ministry of Foreign Affairs welcomed Israel's recognition of Somaliland. The People's Republic of China criticised Israel's move, as Somaliland sits on a "jugular vein" of its Maritime Silk Road.

On 30 December, all three of Somaliland's political parties - Kulmiye, Waddani and Kaah - issued a joint statement endorsing Israel's recognition.

===== Crackdown on pro-Palestinian protests =====
Following regional developments related to Israel and Somaliland, reports emerged of arrests targeting individuals who participated in protests expressing solidarity with Palestine. According to local media outlets, civil society groups, and community leaders, demonstrations opposing Israel's actions in Gaza and warning of regional destabilisation were dispersed by security forces in several areas under Somaliland administration.

Members of the Somaliland Parliament have condemned the arrest of several individuals who held a protest expressing their opposition to relations with Israel."

Authorities reportedly cited public order and security concerns as justification for the arrests. Critics, however, described the measures as an effort to suppress political dissent and prevent public discussion of sensitive geopolitical issues.

===== Arrests of religious leaders and clerics =====
In addition to civilian protesters, several Islamic scholars and religious leaders were reportedly detained after delivering sermons or public statements criticising Israel's policies and warning of what they described as harmful intentions toward the Horn of Africa. These clerics allegedly framed their messages in religious and political terms, linking developments in Gaza to broader regional security risks.

===== Diplomatic visit following recognition =====
Following Israel's recognition of Somaliland, Israeli Foreign Minister Gideon Sa'ar made an official visit to Hargeisa in January 2026, becoming the first senior Israeli official to do so. During the visit, Sa'ar met Somaliland President Muse Bihi Abdi and other officials, describing Somaliland as a strategic partner and highlighting cooperation on security, trade, and regional stability. The visit drew sharp criticism from Somalia, which reiterated its claim over Somaliland's territory and condemned the move as a violation of its sovereignty.

=== After recognition ===
In February 2026, Israel accepted the Somaliland ambassador appointment of Mohamed Omar Hagi Mohamoud, and he presented his credentials to the President of Israel on 18 May. Israel named Michael Lotem as their first ever ambassador to Somaliland in April 2026. The following month, Somaliland announced it would open its embassy to Israel in Jerusalem.

On 14 June 2026, president Abdirahman Mohamed Abdullahi arrived in Israel, marking the first-ever state visit by a Somaliland head of state. The next day, the Somaliland embassy to Israel was opened in Jerusalem at Har Hotzvim high-tech park. The opposition party Kaah, though supporting relations with Israel, opposed the opening of the embassy in Jerusalem due to "legal and political concerns".

== Military and intelligence cooperation ==
The Mossad spent years cultivating discreet and high-level relationships in Somaliland prior to Israel's recognition. During 2024, Israel was reportedly interested in establishing a base in Somaliland due to its strategic location near Yemen.

In an 8 January 2026 interview with Israel's Channel 12, Somaliland Foreign Ministry official Deqa Qasim stated that discussions regarding the potential establishment of an Israeli military base in the territory are currently underway, contradicting previous government denials regarding military cooperation. According to the intelligence services of the Federal Government of Somalia, Somaliland has accepted the condition of the establishment of an Israeli military base on the coast in exchange for recognition. On 13 January 2026, while declining to elaborate on the full extent of the declared defence ties, Somaliland Foreign Minister Abdirahman Dahir Adan stated, "There are no limits as to what areas we can work with."

In May 2026, The Telegraph reported that 50 Somaliland special forces had completed military training in Tel Aviv. Israel has used covert military bases in Somaliland during the 2026 Iran war as a stop for long-range flights.

== Health collaboration ==
Since 2004, Israeli NGO Save a Child's Heart has worked together with Somaliland to provide paediatric cardiology treatment for children suffering heart conditions. This includes transporting children to Israel to perform surgeries, of which by December 2025, 49 children have been treated in Israel. The organisation works closely with the Edna Adan Maternity Hospital, which was founded by Edna Adan Ismail, who was the first female Foreign Minister of Somaliland and an activist for the abolition of female genital mutilation.

In his inaugural visit to Israel in June 2026, president Irro visited the Save a Child's Heart Center at the Wolfson Medical Center in Holon where he met nine Somalilander children, and their parents, currently receiving cardiac care. He expressed his gratitude for medical staff, surgeons and management of Save a Child's Heart who have provided specialized medical treatments for children unable to access necessary care in their home countries.

== Water management technology ==
In February 2026, 25 specialists selected from water agencies across all Somaliland cities—including the Hargeisa Water Agency—were chosen based on their expertise to attend high-level science and water management training in Tel Aviv. Israel is noted as one of the most advanced in the water management and agriculture sectors in the Middle East. The Hargeisa Water Agency stated that the training will play an important role in the development and improvement of water services in Hargeisa.

== New markets ==
Following recognition, two of the first companies expected to enter the Somaliland market are set to provide significant logistical and strategic support, laying the groundwork for further investment by other Israeli companies. VisiRight, a technology company specializing in remote inspection, security technology, and critical infrastructure protection, has entered into a strategic partnership with Amore Capital to provide Somaliland with technology for its borders, ports, and infrastructure. The partnership will also focus on facilitating connections between international companies and Somaliland government institutions.

== See also ==
- Foreign relations of Israel
- Foreign relations of Somaliland
- History of the Jews in Somalia
- International recognition of Israel
- International recognition of Somaliland
- Israel–Somalia relations
- Lists of active separatist movements
