= Somaliland–United Arab Emirates relations =

- Somaliland: United Arab Emirates

Envoy
- Ambassador of Somaliland to the United Arab Emirates: Director of the UAE Trade Office in Somaliland Abdullah Al Naqbi

Somaliland–United Arab Emirates relations refers to the relationship between Somaliland and the United Arab Emirates. Somaliland maintains a representative (liaison) office in the UAE, which also maintains a representative office in Hargeisa. On 13 March 2021, Abdullah Al Naqbi was appointed as the UAE's liaison to Somaliland.

== History ==
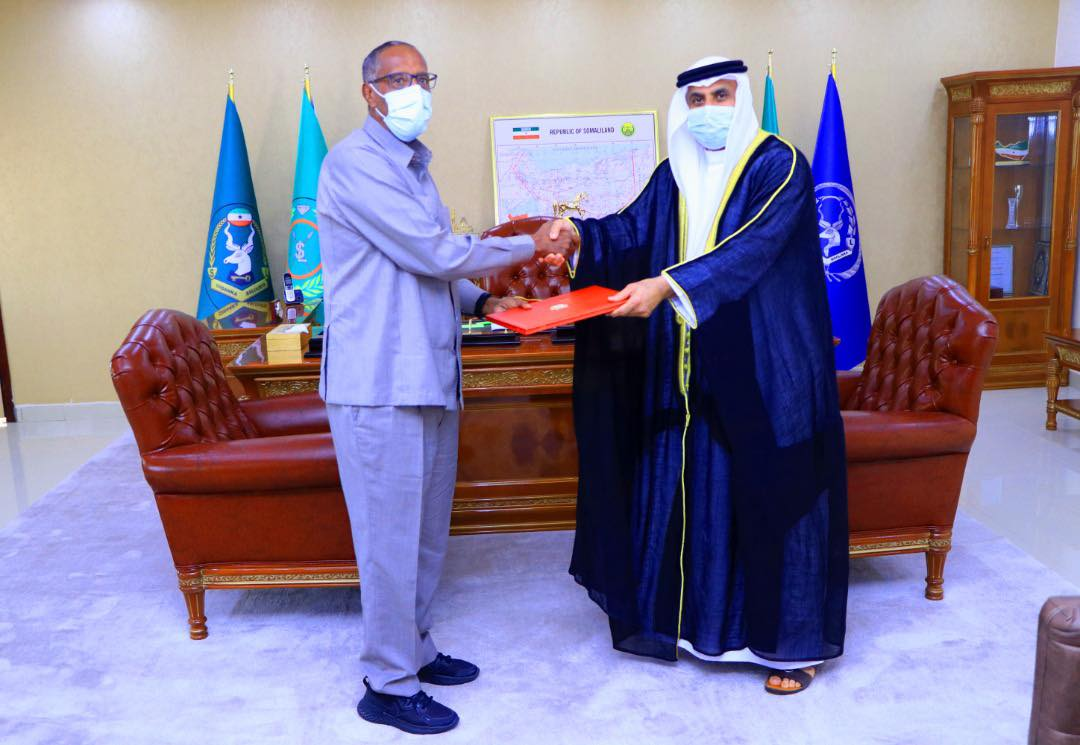
The President of Somaliland, Muse Bihi Abdi with UAE liaison Abdullah Al Naqbi.

In February 2017, both houses of the parliament of Somaliland accepted the bid from the government of the UAE for the United Arab Emirates Armed Forces to establish a military base in Berbera along with the redevelopment of the Berbera Airport. The United Arab Emirates has appointed a new representative to Somaliland which will be the first Arab nation to send a diplomat to Hargeisa.

== See also ==
- Foreign relations of Somaliland
- Foreign relations of the United Arab Emirates
