= Foreign relations of Somaliland =

Foreign relations of the Republic of Somaliland are the responsibility of the Ministry of Foreign Affairs of the Republic of Somaliland. The region's declaration of independence from Somalia on 18 May 1991 after the start of the ongoing Somali Civil War remains unrecognised by the international community, with the exception of Israel, which extended formal diplomatic recognition to Somaliland as a sovereign and independent state on 26 December 2025.

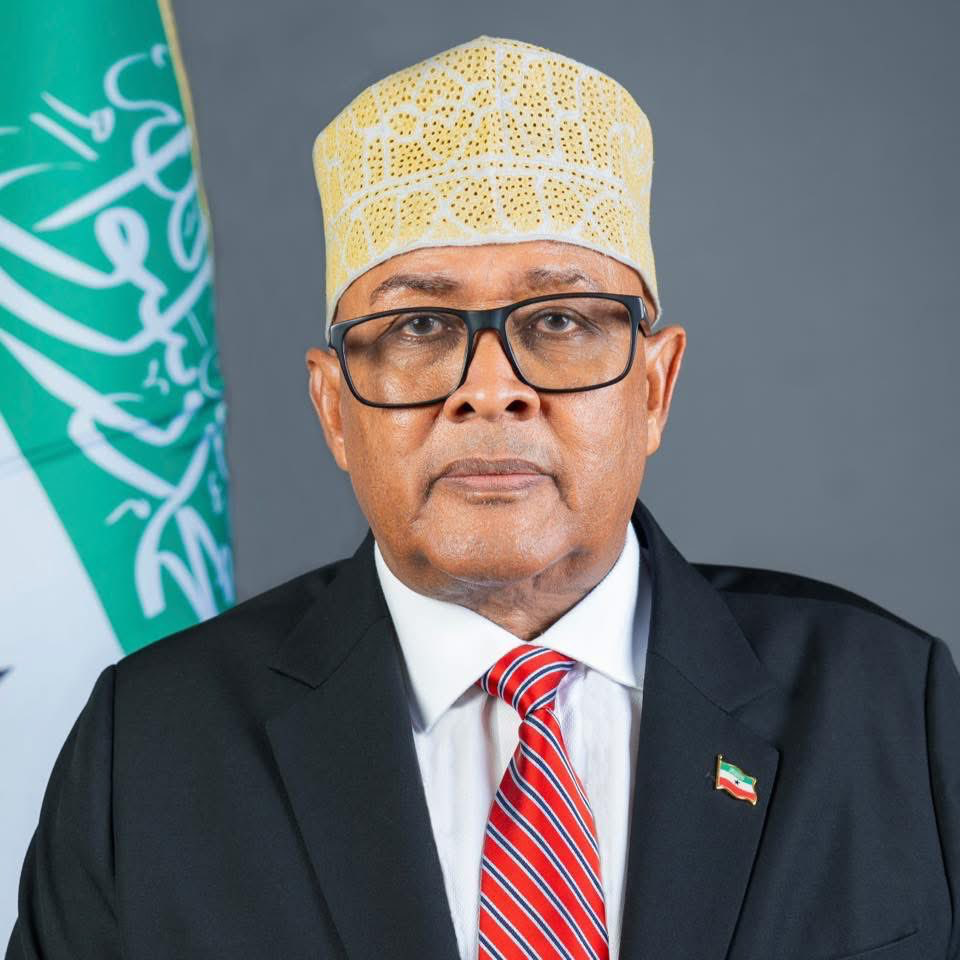
The President of the Republic of Somaliland, Abdirahman Mohamed Abdullahi, pushed for international recognition at the 2025 World Governments Summit held in Dubai.

Due to its status, the Republic of Somaliland currently has official contacts with only a few nations, such as Israel with Diplomatic ackowledement in 2025 December, Ethiopia, which has signed a strategic and infrastructure agreement, and the United Arab Emirates, which has signed a concession agreement to manage the Port of Berbera. Somaliland has established de facto embassies with nations such as the United States, as well as Taiwan. International recognition as a sovereign state remains at the forefront of the government's current foreign policy. Other key priorities include encouraging international aid and foreign direct investment. Media Sources state Somaliland has Many Diplomatic ackowledments upcoming with lobbying in Many Countrys and Being finally admitted By United Nations.

Most multilateral organisations and countries in the international community support the territorial integrity (i.e. territorial unity) of Somalia and its central government, the Federal Government of Somalia during the ongoing civil war and oppose Somaliland's secession.

== International recognition ==
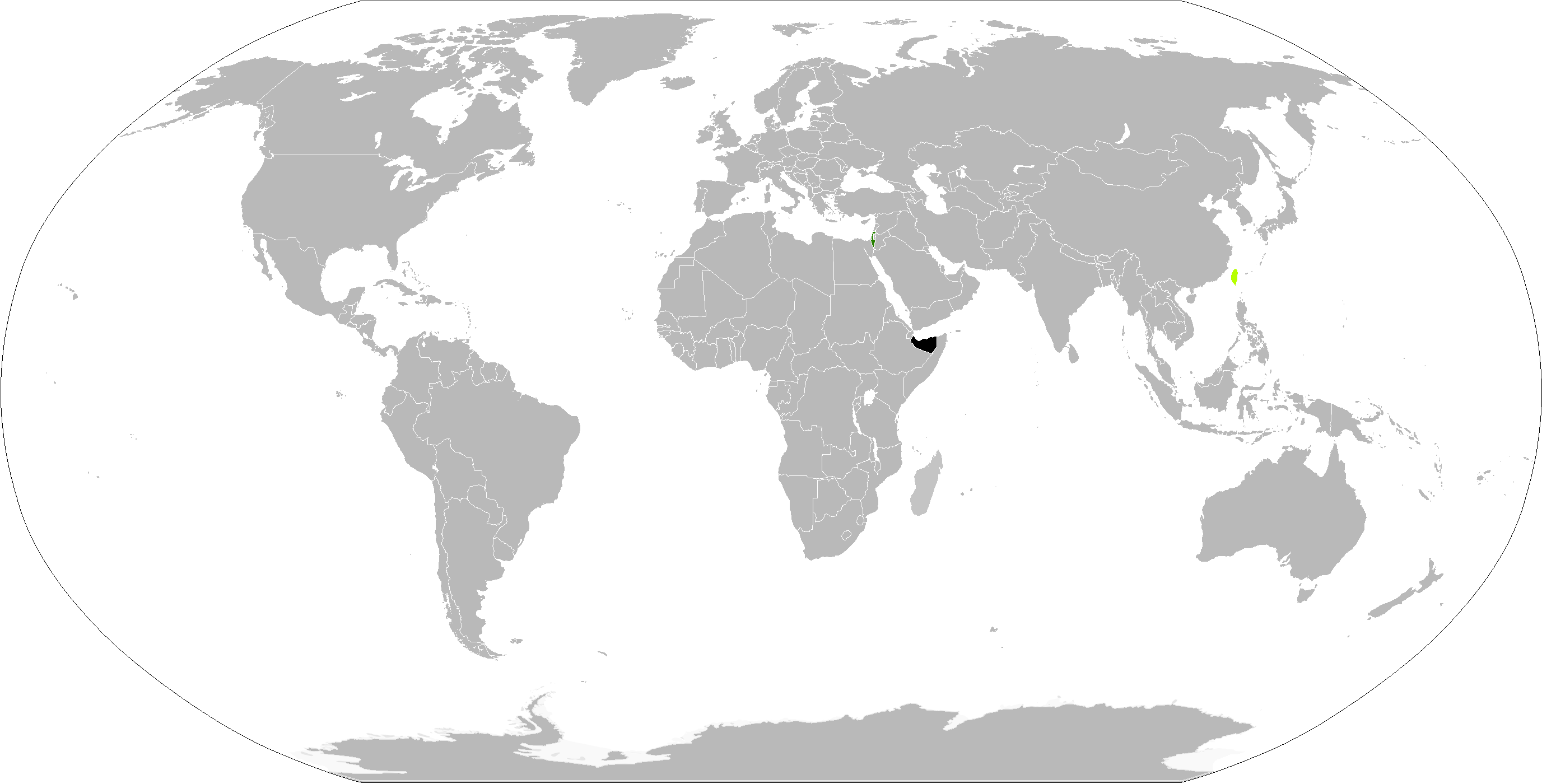
International recognition of Somaliland Somaliland States that have recognised Somaliland States whose recognition of Somaliland is unclear

As of 26 December 2025, Israel is the only United Nations member state that recognises the Republic of Somaliland as an independent sovereign state.

== Bilateral relations ==
Somaliland has political contacts with neighbouring Ethiopia and Djibouti, as well as with Belgium, Canada, France, Ghana, Kenya, Norway, Russia, South Africa, South Sudan, Sweden, the United Kingdom, the United States, and Yemen.

Somaliland joined Swift International Banking Organsiation in 2026 seen as major leap towards recogntion, Bank of Somaliland became a member in 2026.

=== Africa ===
In 2011, the foreign ministers of South Africa and Tanzania said that they would not recognise Somaliland and preferred that Somalia remain a single country. In 2012, South Africa and Ethiopia again re-affirmed their continued support for Somalia's government, territorial integrity, and sovereignty at the mini-summit on Somalia in New York on the margins of the United Nations General Assembly. However, South Africa has formally declared that Somaliland fulfils the Montevideo Convention criteria for statehood in addition to it accepting the Somaliland passport.

==== Ethiopia ====
Somaliland has had decent economic relations with Ethiopia since the Eritrean–Ethiopian War, as a large part of Ethiopian exports have been handled via the port of Berbera, since Ethiopia can no longer use Eritrean ports of Massaua and Assab. These relationships stand in contrast to the historical hostility towards Ethiopia in Somalia, and build upon the pragmatic alliance formed after the 1977–1978 Ogaden War, when Ethiopia provided sanctuary and financial backing to the northern-based Somali National Movement (SNM) in its insurgency against Siad Barre's regime. So far, however, these have not led to official Ethiopian recognition. On 1 January 2024, Ethiopia and Somaliland signed a pact giving Ethiopia access to the Red Sea in return for eventual recognition, making it the first UN member state to do so.

==== Guinea ====
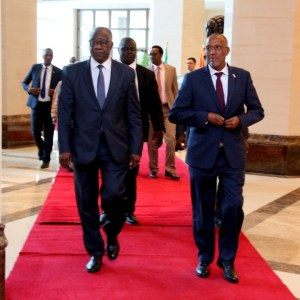
The fifth President of Somaliland, Muse Bihi Abdi, visit to the Republic of Guinea.

In late July 2019, Somaliland President Muse Bihi Abdi led a delegation to the Republic of Guinea at the invitation of President Alpha Conde.

==== Kenya ====
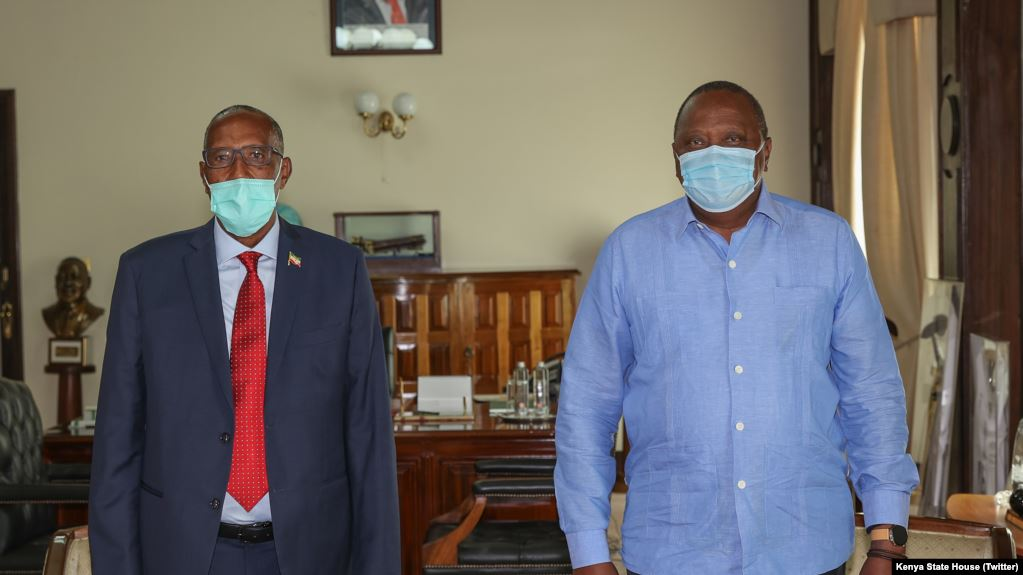
President Bihi and Kenyan President, Uhuru Kenyatta

In December 2020, Kenya and Somaliland agreed that a Kenyan consulate would open in Hargeisa, and to commence direct flights between Hargeisa and Nairobi, both by March 2021.

=== Americas ===
==== United States ====
Somaliland and the United States do not have official diplomatic relations. However, Somaliland operates a representative liaison office in Washington, D.C., but it does not have formal diplomatic status under the provisions of the Vienna Convention on Diplomatic Relations. Both countries do maintain contacts as delegations from both sides have met in the past. The U.S. policy regarding Somaliland is to first allow the African Union to deliberate the question regarding the status of Somaliland as an independent nation.

The United States engages Somaliland on policy matters such as democratisation and economic development. In 2023, the United States provided $1,000,000 in aid through the International Republican Institute to support training for parliamentarians and other key programs in preparations for the 2024 Somaliland presidential election. American organizations have lobbied for recognition of Somaliland; these groups include The Heritage Foundation and Hudson Institute. The U.S. was expected to provide an additional $1,500,000 in continued support for the democratisation process in Somaliland following the elections. In March 2025, there were reports that Israeli and American government officials spoke with Somaliland, as well as Somalia and Sudan regarding the resettlement of Gazans displaced by the Gaza War. However, both Somalia and Somaliland denied receiving any proposal from the United States or Israel to resettle Gazans. USA brokered Somaliland to Join SWIFT International banking Organisation, Bank of Somaliland is Now member of SWIFT In 2026.

=== Asia ===
==== Israel ====
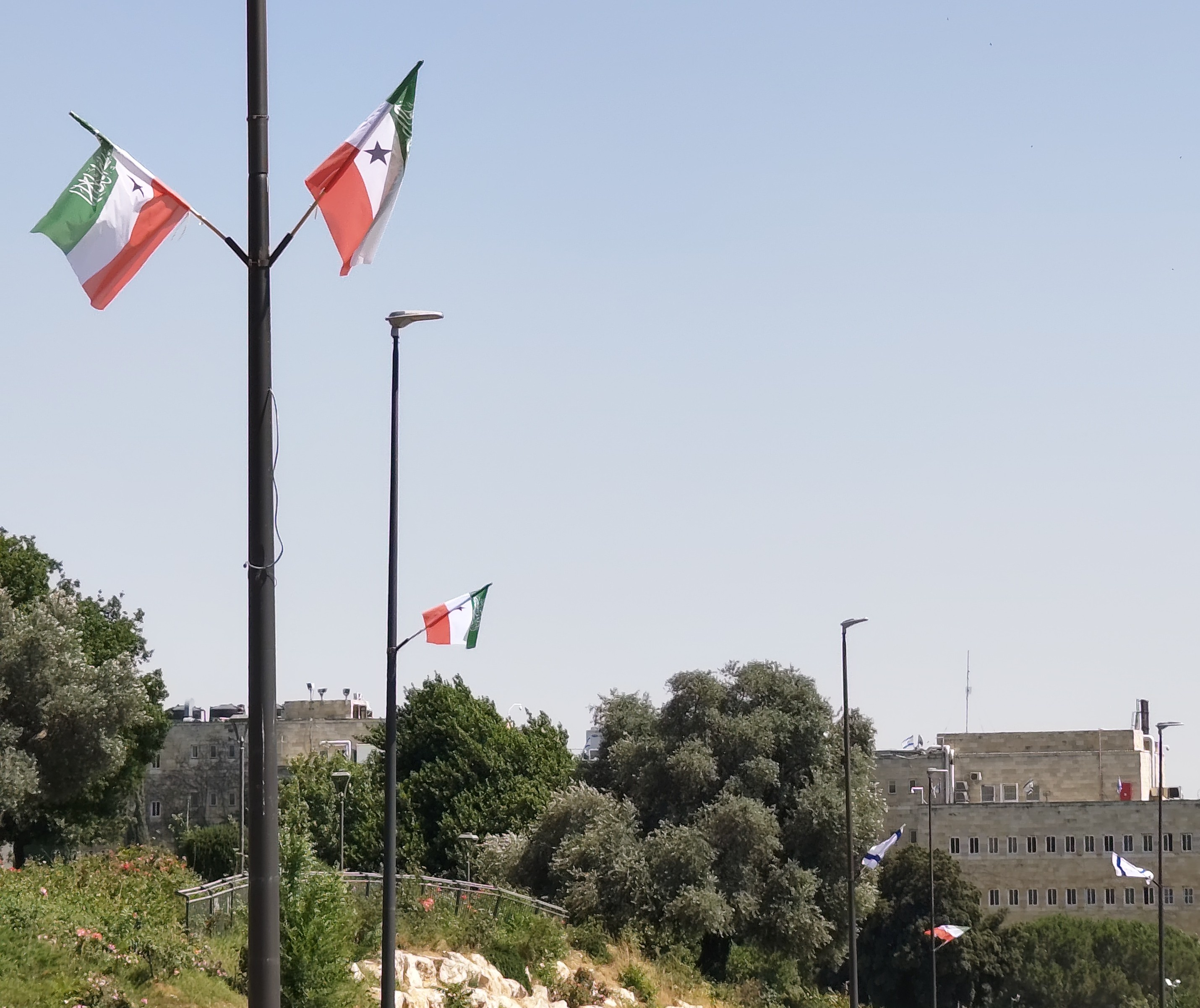
Somaliland and Israeli flags in Jerusalem for the visit of Somaliland President Abdirahman Mohamed Abdullahi

Israel was one of 35 countries that recognised Somaliland's brief independence in 1960. In February 2010, Israeli Foreign Ministry spokesperson Yigal Palmor was quoted in the Haaretz Daily that his government was ready to recognise Somaliland again. However, he stated that the Somaliland government has not contacted the Israeli government to seek ties.

In 1995, former President Egal of Somaliland also wrote a letter to Prime Minister Yitzhak Rabin seeking to establish diplomatic ties between the two countries. In September 2001, it was also reported that Somaliland was looking towards Tel Aviv after Saudi Arabia banned imports of livestock from the country due to Rift Valley fever. During this time several Israeli businessmen were also in the nation's capital Hargeisa. However, President Kahin, who succeeded Egal, is reported to have avoided approaching Israel to prevent straining fragile relations with the Arab and Muslim world, which it heavily relies on for its livestock trade. In August 2020, Somaliland expressed its support for the Israel–United Arab Emirates normalisation agreement. In 2024 Times of Israel media source stated that Israel's Somaliland recognition would boost security for the country, after UK/USA Planning to open representative offices in Hargeisa, Somaliland's capital. In March 2025, there were reports that Israeli and American government officials spoke with Somaliland, as well as Somalia and Sudan regarding the resettlement of Gazans displaced by the Gaza war. However, both Somalia and Somaliland denied receiving any proposal from the United States or Israel to resettle Gazans.

On 26 December 2025, Israel formally recognised the Republic of Somaliland as an independent and sovereign state, after the two countries signed a mutual declaration "in the spirit of the Abraham Accords". Somaliland thanked Israel and expressed appreciation for its efforts in combating terrorism and promoting regional peace. Following Israel's recognition, Somalia called for an emergency meeting of the United Nations Security Council. At the end of the meeting the council did not adopt any binding resolution supporting Israel’s move.

On 15 June 2026, Somaliland opened its first-ever embassy, in Jerusalem, with the presence of president Abdirahman Mohamed Abdullahi.

==== Taiwan ====
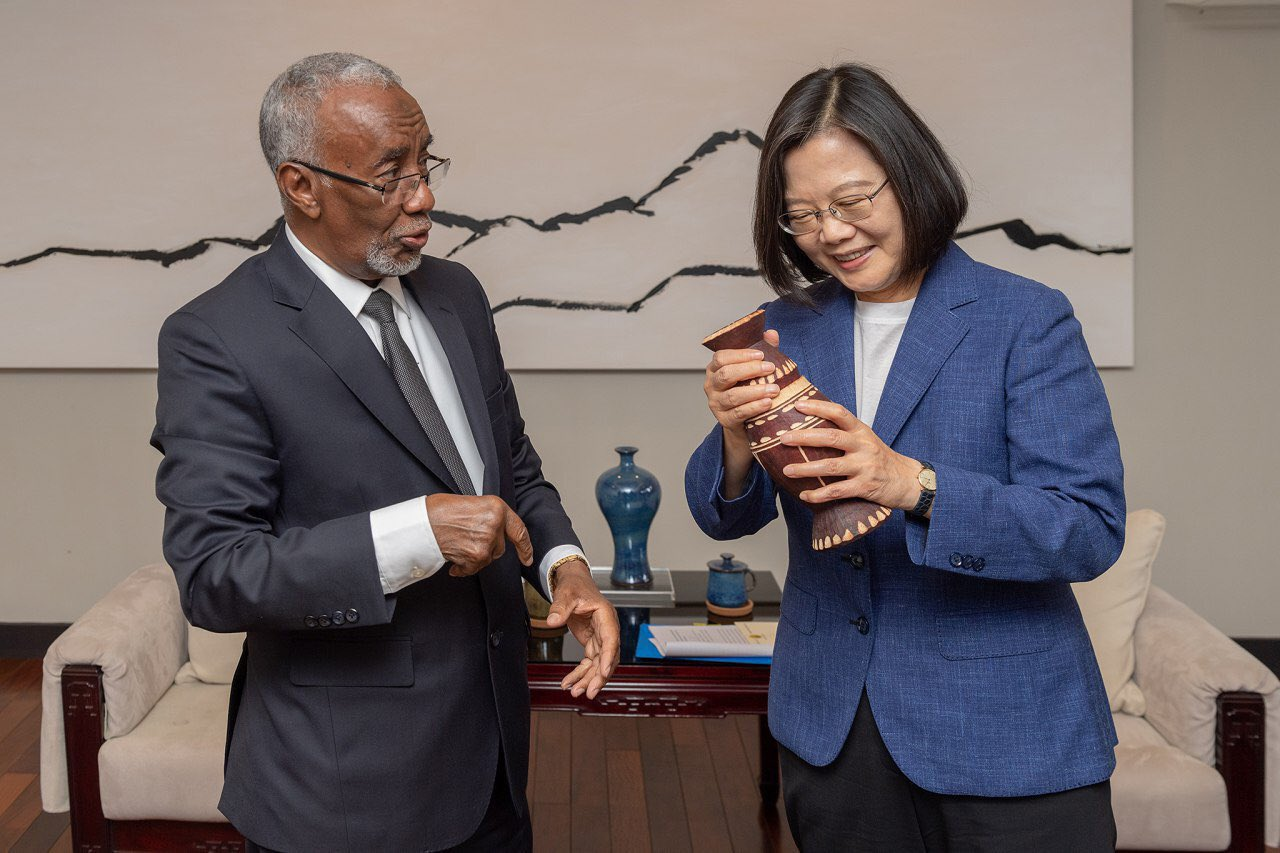
Somaliland Foreign Minister Hagi Mohamoud with the then-President of Taiwan, Tsai Ing-wen

In July 2020, Somaliland announced that it would establish a representative office in Taiwan (Republic of China). The Taiwan Representative Office officially was established in Hargeisa the next month. In August, Taiwan opened its office in Somaliland, which was reciprocated by Somaliland by opening an office in Taiwan on 9 September 2020.

==== Turkey ====
Though not recognising Somaliland and accrediting the building to Somalia, Turkey has an active consulate in Hargeisa. Since 2013, Turkey has been a mediator between the Somali and Somaliland governments. In 2019, Somali Minister of Foreign Affairs Ahmed Isse Awad stated that Turkey plays a leading role in the mediation process. Somaliland rejected Turkey's mediation role between Ethiopia and Somalia in a seaport deal by Somaliland in 2024.

In 2012, Genel Enerji, an energy company mostly owned by Çukurova Holding, signed a deal with the Somaliland government to search oil reserves within the nation. Genel oil blocs found major crude oil vein around 2 Barrles of crude oil in bahadhamal region of genel west bloc, Genel energy is seen as a success in Somaliland- Turkey relations.

==== United Arab Emirates ====
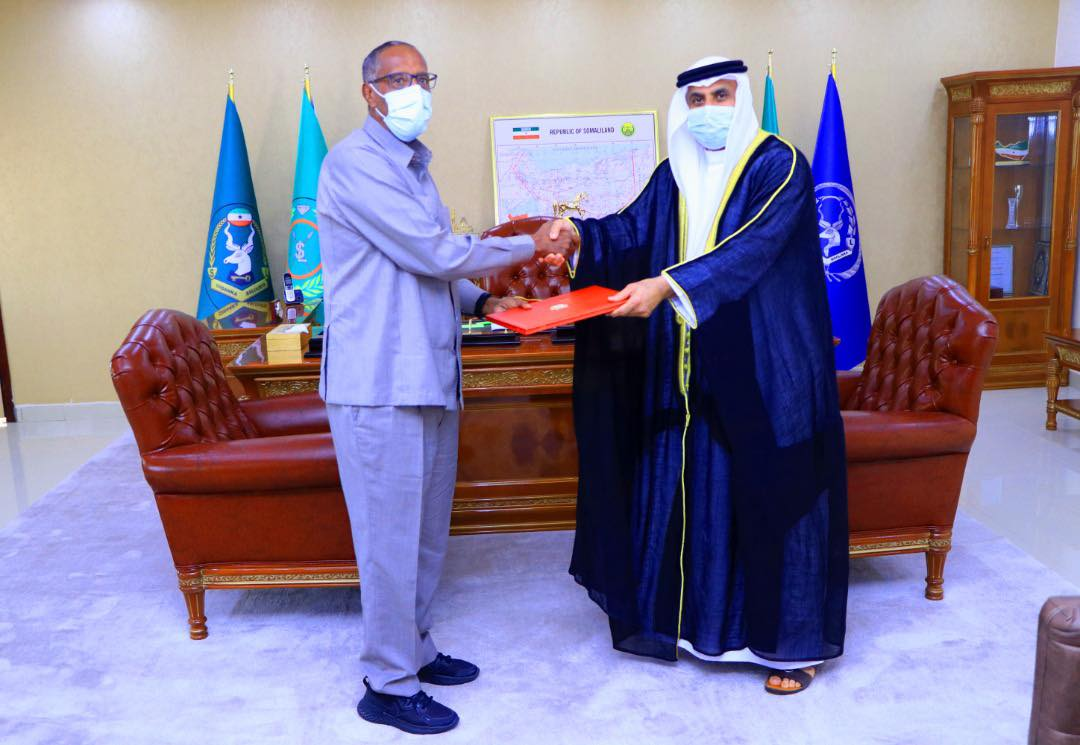
The fifth President of Somaliland, Muse Bihi Abdi with UAE Amb. Abdulla Alnaqbi.

In February 2017, both houses of the parliament of Somaliland accepted the bid from the government of the UAE for the Union Defence Force (UAE) to establish a military base in Berbera along with the redevelopment of the Berbera Airport. The United Arab Emirates has appointed a new representative to Somaliland which will be the first Arab nation to send a diplomat to Hargeisa. On 13 March 2021, Abdulla Al-Naqbi was appointed as UAE ambassador to Somaliland.

=== Europe ===
==== United Kingdom ====
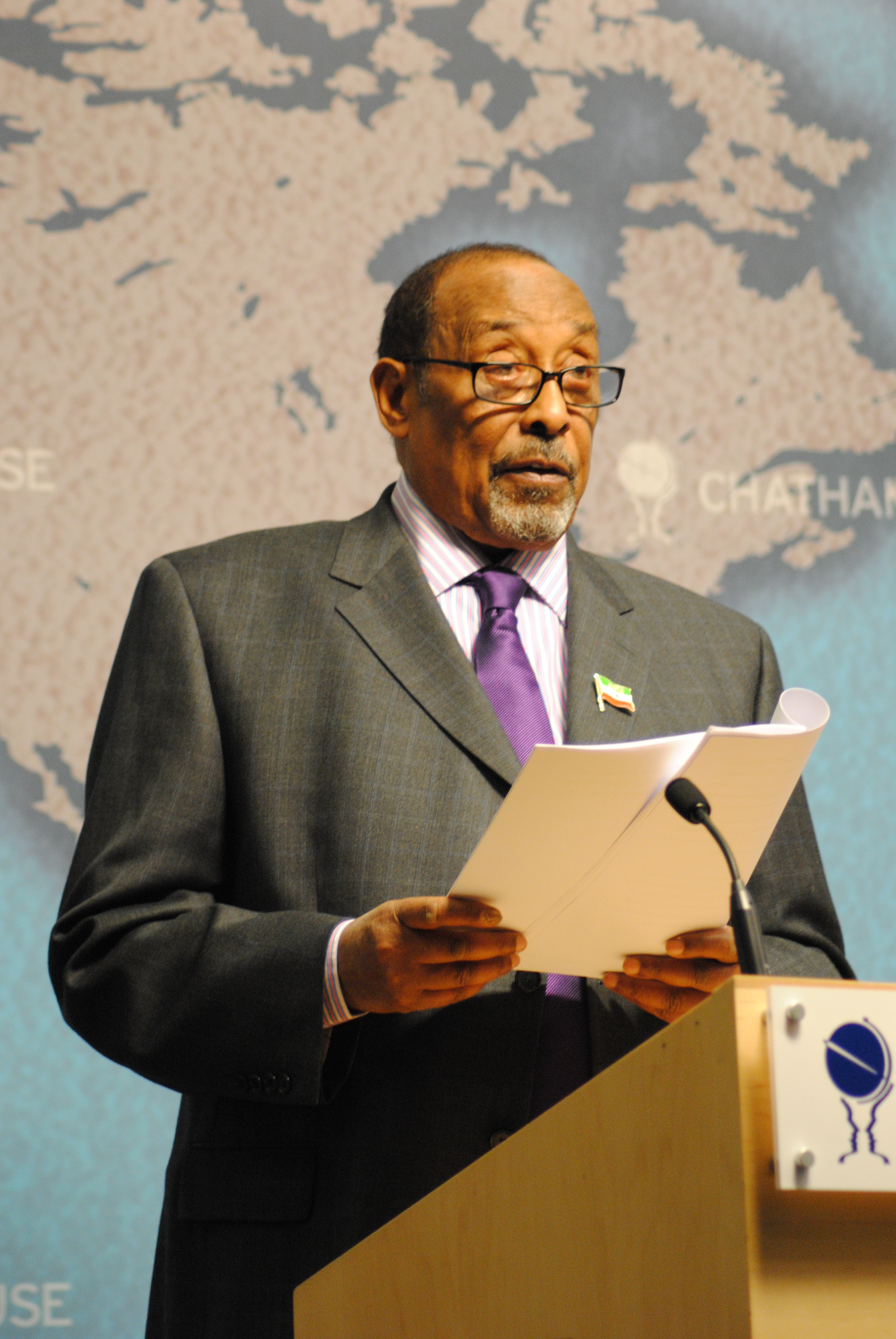
Ahmed Mahamoud Silanyo, 4th President of the Republic of Somaliland, speaking at Chatham House in 2010.

In April 2014, the Sheffield City Council in the United Kingdom voted to recognise the right to self-determination of Somaliland, the second British city council to do so, after the Bristol City Council. The gesture however was ceremonial and not legally binding. On 26 March 2015, Cardiff Council followed suit and later on 18 May 2015, the UK Independence Party announced their support for the recognition of Somaliland. This was followed by the Conservative UK government's official opening of a British Office in Hargeisa, the capital of Somaliland. In 2020, the United Kingdom, Denmark and the Netherlands approved four agreements with the government of Somaliland to improve critical infrastructure to support economic growth. In July 2019, the Birmingham City Council recognised the right to self-determination of Somaliland, becoming the 5th in Britain. On 4 July 2023, Gavin Williamson proposed a bill to the UK Parliament that would require the United Kingdom to recognise the Republic of Somaliland as an independent state.

==== Germany ====
In 2002, Germany considered recognising Somaliland and establishing a military base in the country. They did not do so and the naval base was instead established in Djibouti. German naval ships already operated from Berbera. In September 2012, at the mini-summit on Somalia on the margins of the United Nations General Assembly, the German government re-affirmed its continued support for Somalia's government, territorial integrity and sovereignty. In 2019, the German ambassador to Kenya and Somalia visited Hargeisa and met with Muse Bihi Abdi.

==== Pakistan ====
In November 2009, a Pakistani delegation composed of Sheikh Mansoor Ahmed, Secretary General of the ruling Pakistan Peoples Party, Pakistan Peace Representative, former diplomat and Senior Consular Officer,( S. Ahmed Qureshi) and Abdul Razak Dinnaari, an ambassador, visited Somaliland and proposed the opening of a Somaliland trade office in Pakistan. The idea was could materialized due to lack of interest by Pakistan authorities. In February 2020, Pakistan's Look Africa Policy Initiative conference was held in Nairobi, Kenya.

== Diplomatic representative offices ==
=== Embassy ===
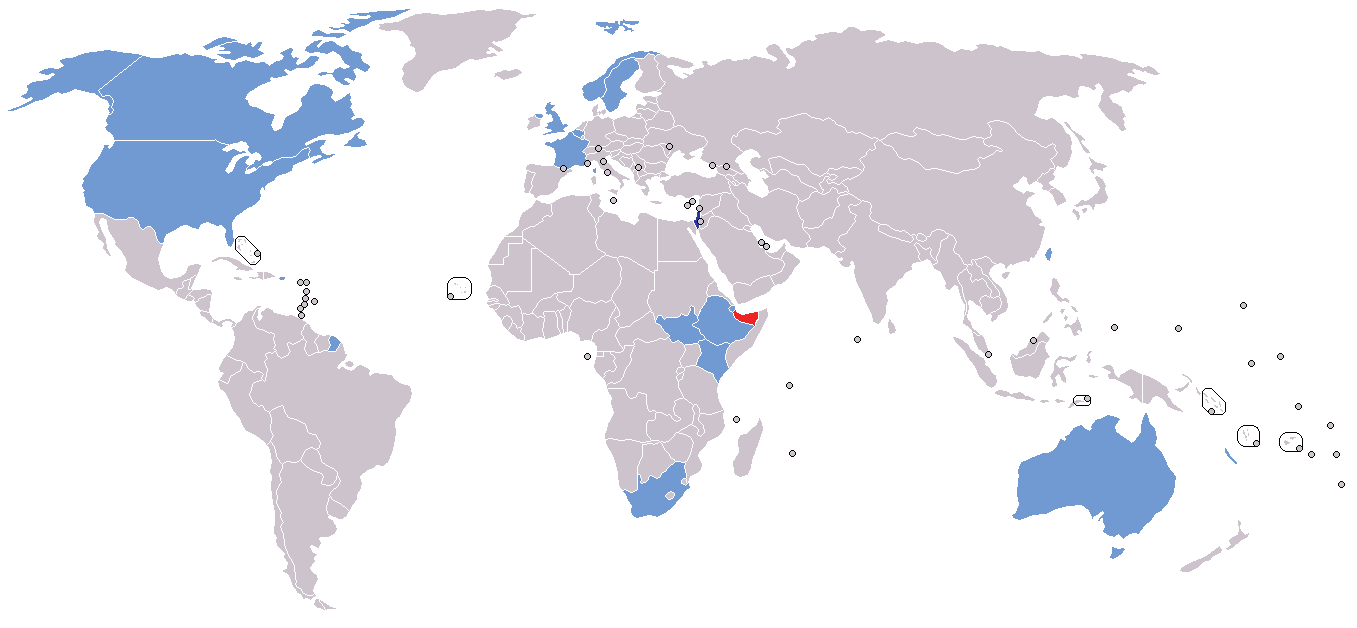
Map of representative offices of Somaliland Somaliland States hosting an embassy of Somaliland States hosting a representative office of Somaliland

As of June 2026, Somaliland has opened one embassy, which is located in Israel.

This embassy exist in the following city:

- (Israel) Jerusalem

=== Liaison offices of Somaliland ===
Somaliland maintains representative (liaison) offices in several countries, but these missions do not have formal diplomatic status under the provisions of the Vienna Convention on Diplomatic Relations.

Such offices exist in the following cities:

- (Ethiopia) Addis Ababa
- Djibouti City
- (United Arab Emirates) Dubai
- (South Sudan) Juba
- (United Kingdom) London (details)
- (Kenya) Nairobi
- (Norway) Oslo
- (France) Paris
- (South Africa) Pretoria
- (Saudi Arabia) Riyadh
- (Sweden) Stockholm
- (Taiwan) Taipei (details)
- (Italy) Turin
- (United States) Washington metropolitan area (Alexandria)

=== Representative offices of foreign governments in Somaliland ===
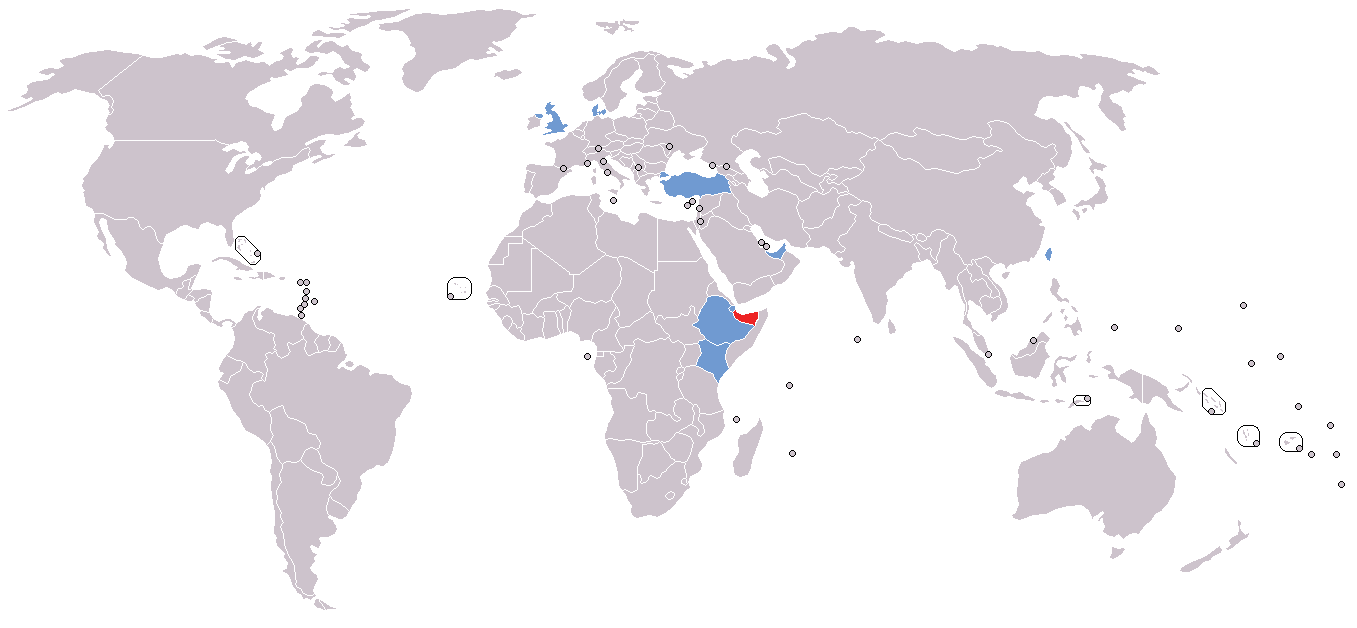
Map of diplomatic missions in Somaliland Somaliland States with consulate or representative office in Somaliland

The following foreign governments have diplomatic offices in Hargeisa:

- Denmark – Programme office
- Djibouti – Consulate; headed by a diplomat with the rank of consul general
- Ethiopia – Consulate; headed by a diplomat with the rank of ambassador.
- Kenya – Liaison office
- Taiwan – Representative office
- Turkey – Consulate; headed by a diplomat with the rank of consul general
- United Arab Emirates – Commercial office
- United Kingdom – Office

As of February 2010, the Yemeni government is reportedly planning to open a diplomatic office in Hargeisa.

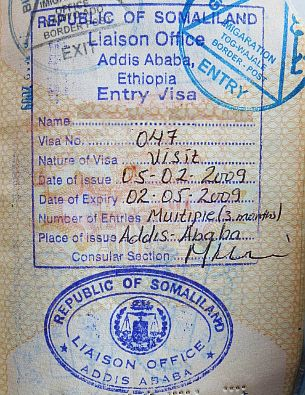
Somaliland entry visa

== Passports ==
Regular Passport

Service Passport

Diplomatic Passport

== Organisational membership ==
Somaliland participates in its own name in the World Economic Forum. Somaliland is also a founding member of the World Alliance for Disaster Management (WADM). It is treated as a full member alongside internationally recognised countries and Taiwan.

Somaliland is a member of the Unrepresented Nations and Peoples Organization (UNPO).

The African Union (AU) is considering Somaliland's application for membership to the bloc and has indicated a willingness to deal with it as an 'outstanding case'.

In 2007, a delegation led by President Kahin was present at the Commonwealth Heads of Government Meeting in Kampala, Uganda. Somaliland has applied to join the Commonwealth under observer status, but its application remains pending.

== See also ==
- List of representative offices of Somaliland
- List of diplomatic missions in Somaliland
