= Çukurova Media Group =

Turkish media conglomerate

- Industry: Publishing, Broadcasting
- Headquarters: Turkey
- Area served: Turkey
- Key people: Mehmet Emin Karamehmet
- Website: www.cukurovaholding.com.tr/eng/medya_grup.asp

Çukurova Media Group (Çukurova Medya Grubu) is a Turkish media conglomerate established as part of the Çukurova Holding conglomerate. On 18 May 2013 it transferred a substantial number of its properties to the state TMSF, in partial settlement of a tax debt.

== History ==
=== Newspapers ===
The newspaper portfolio included Akşam, Tercüman and Güneş. In January 2009, it acquired a stake in Editions des Deux Terres, a French publisher. The company's magazine portfolio includes Alem (lifestyle magazine launched in 1993), Autocar (launched in 1895), FourFourTwo (football magazine launched in 2006), Stuff (gadget magazine), Total Film (film magazine launched in 2007), Platin and World Business (business and economy magazine launched in 2006), Maxim (launched in 2007), and Eve.

Çukurova suffered during the financial crisis, and it closed down Tercüman in 2010.

=== Television and radio ===
TurkMedya operated Alem FM (first private radio station in Turkey) and Lig Radyo. Both stations are available through Digiturk, satellite receivers and yayinonline.com. Alem FM broadcasts in 49 regions.

AKS Televizyon Reklamcilik ve Filmcilik was established in 1992 and commenced broadcasting as Show TV in Turkey. Skyturk was founded in 2002 by Atlas Yayinclik. It commenced broadcasting on cable and digital platforms in February 2003. Aks Uluslararasi Yayincilik has broadcast ShowTurk since 2005 and ShowMax TV since 2006. ShowPlus is also available through Digiturk, a digital platform.

== Properties ==
=== Newspapers ===
- 1982-2008: Bulvar
- 1996-2013: Güneş (acquired from Güneri Cıvaoğlu, sold to TMSF.)
- 1997-2013: Akşam (acquired from Mehmet Ali Ilıcak, sold to TMSF.)
- 1997-2010: Tercüman (acquired from Mehmet Ali Ilıcak.)

=== Television ===
- 1999-2013: Show TV (acquired from Erol Aksoy, sold to TMSF, which sold to Ciner Media Group)
- 2000-2013: Lig TV (sold to TMSF.)
- 2000-2012: Skytürk
- 2004-2006: SinemaTURK
- 2004-2008: ElMax
- 2005-2013: Show Türk (sold to TMSF)
- 2005-2008: S'nek
- 2006-2013: İZ TV (sold to TMSF)
- 2006-2013: ShowMax TV (sold to TMSF)
- 2006-2013: Turkmax (sold to TMSF)
- 2008-2011: SporMax
- 2012-2013: Skytürk 360 (sold to TMSF)
- 2012-: Nickelodeon (Turkey) (50% Viacom)
- 2012-: MTV Europe (50% Viacom Internatıonal)
- 2012-: VH1 (50% Viacom Internatıonal)
- 2012-: MTV Live HD (50% Viacom Internatıonal)
- 2012-: MTV Hits (Avrupa) (50% MTV Networks Europe)
- 2012-: Nick Jr. (Turkey) (50% [Viacom Internatıonal)

=== Radio ===
- 1994-2013: Alem FM (sold to TMSF)
- 2005-2013: Lig Radyo (sold to TMSF)

=== Other ===
- 1994-2013: Turkcell (sold to TMSF)
- 1996-: Azercell
- 2013-: Kamucell
