= Somaliland–Taiwan relations =

Bilateral relations between Somaliland and Taiwan

- Taiwan: Somaliland

Diplomatic mission
- Taiwan Representative Office, Hargeisa: Representative Office of Somaliland, Taipei

Envoy
- Representative Allen Chenhwa Lou: Representative Mahmoud Adam Jama Galaal

Somaliland–Taiwan relations refers to the relationship between the Republic of Somaliland and the Republic of China (Taiwan). The ROC was one of the 35 countries to recognize the original independence of the short lived State of Somaliland in 1960.

The two countries in 2020 established embassy-like representative offices in each other's capital city. Somaliland claims that Republic of China (Taiwan) recognises their independence. The Republic of China (Taiwan) for its part officially refers to Somaliland as a country, but has not released a formal declaration of recognition of Somaliland's independence.

== History ==
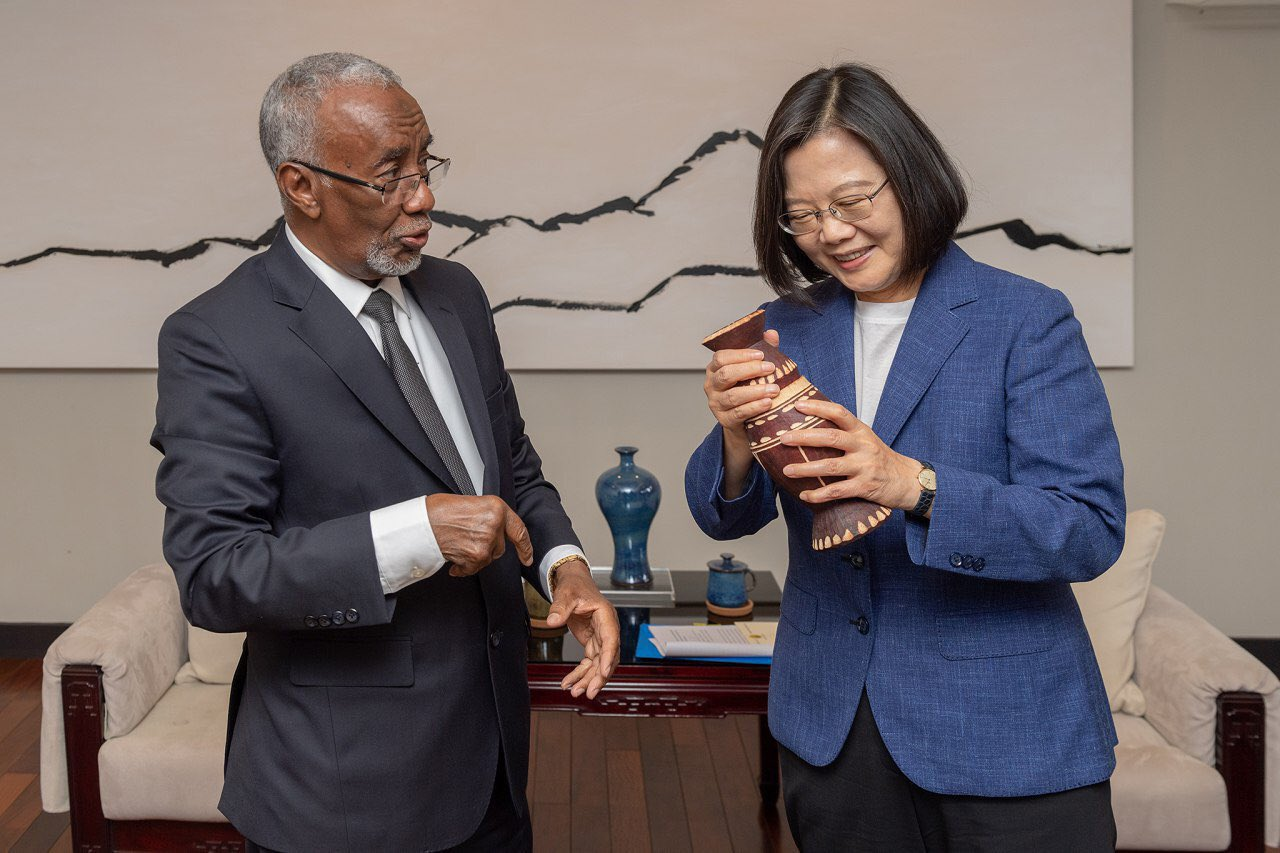
The President of the ROC (Taiwan) Tsai Ing-wen meets with the Minister of Foreign Affairs of Somaliland Yasin Haji Mohamoud.

=== 1960 independence recognition ===
The Republic of China (Taiwan), at that time a permanent member of the United Nations Security Council, was one of 35 countries that recognized the independence of the former British Somaliland as the new State of Somaliland on 26 June 1960 but was unified with the Italian Somaliland shortly after.

=== Modern history ===
The ROC and the Republic of Somaliland have gradually established positive interactive relations since 2009. Both countries are members of the Unrepresented Nations and Peoples Organization (UNPO).

In November 2019, Ali Yang Syin-yi, Director-General of the Department of West Asian and African Affairs of the Department of the Ministry of Foreign Affairs of the Republic of China, went to Somaliland to meet with the head of the Central Bank. The head hoped to establish a close partnership with the Central Bank of the Republic of China.

In February 2020, the Foundation for International Cooperation and Development (CCICED) went to Somaliland to negotiate closer cooperation on agriculture, health and technological development. The Vice President of Somaliland hosted a banquet at his residence, the Minister of Agriculture, the Deputy Minister of Foreign Affairs and other officials.

On 30 July 2020, when the former Taiwanese President Lee Teng-hui died, the Somaliland Ministry of Foreign Affairs said on Twitter: "For such a huge loss, the Ministry of Foreign Affairs of Somaliland, on behalf of the government and people, offers to the government and people of Taiwan. My sincere condolences, we are with Taiwan."

On 3 August 2020, the "Somaliland Chronicle" reported that Somaliland President Muse Bihi Abdi instructed to discuss specific measures to strengthen bilateral relations with Taiwan, and carefully studied the US "Taipei Act", and made relevant suggestions.

On 3 March 2021, Somaliland and Taiwan signed an information technology cooperation agreement meant to upgrade the digitization of Somaliland's government. The three-year plan involved training staff and upgrading Internet management.

In July 2025 the Coast Guard Administration of Taiwan signed a cooperation agreement with the Somaliland Coast Guard.

== Representative organization ==
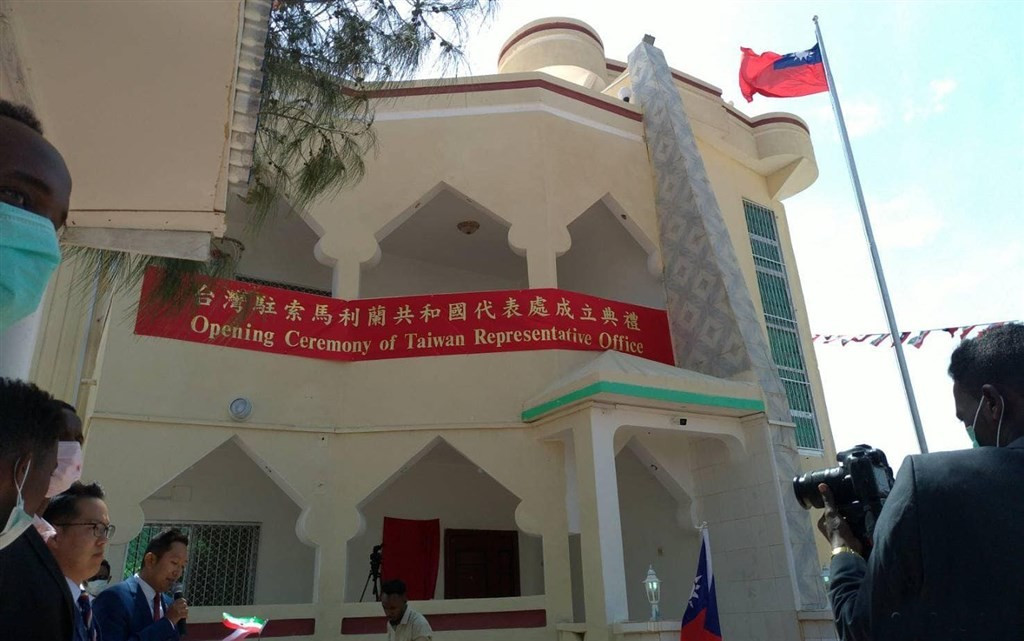
Taiwan Representative Office, Hargeisa

On 26 February 2020, the Government of the Republic of China and the Government of Somaliland signed the "Bilateral Protocol between the Government of the Republic of China (Taiwan) and the Government of the Republic of Somaliland" in Taipei after consultations between the Republic of China's Foreign Minister Joseph Wu Jaushieh and the Somaliland's Foreign Minister Mu Yassin. The two countries have agreed to establish mutual official representative offices under the names of Taiwan Representative Office and Somaliland Representative Office, and the treatment shall be similar to the Vienna Convention on Diplomatic Relations, which deals with the privileges and immunities of diplomats. After the signing ceremony, Mu Yassin will also meet with President Tsai Ing-wen. On 1 July, Joseph Wu officially announced that the unveiling date will be further negotiated by the two countries; Somaliland President Muse Bihi Abdi shared Tsai Ing-wen's tweets on Twitter and expressed his gratitude to Tsai Ing-wen during his visit to Taiwan. Reception, the relationship between the two countries is built on shared value and mutual respect.

On 3 July 2020, the Ministry of Foreign Affairs of the Republic of China announced that Allen Lou Chenhwa, Counselor of the Taipei Economic and Cultural Representative Office in Saudi Arabia, will serve as the first representative in Somaliland; Mud served as the first representative in Taiwan, arrived in Taiwan on 7 August.

On 17 August 2020, the Taiwan Representative Office was established in Hargeisa, the capital, hosted by the first representative Allen Lou and Somaliland Foreign Minister Mu Yassin. At the unveiling ceremony, the national flag of the Republic of China was raised in front of the representative office. The foreign ministers of the two countries signed the Agreement on Technical Cooperation between the Government of the Republic of China (Taiwan) and the Government of the Republic of Somaliland. Since 2021, the Taiwanese Representative, Allen Lou, has been referred to as Ambassador, while retaining the official title of Representative.

== Economic Relations ==
In December 2025, Taiwanese firm Central Sky International Trading Co. began construction of a quarantine livestock zone. The marked the first major Taiwanese economic investment into Somaliland.

== See also ==
- Foreign relations of Somaliland
- Foreign relations of Taiwan
