= Germany–Somaliland relations =

- Somaliland: Germany

Germany and Somaliland do not have formal diplomatic relations but have maintained informal contact. Germany recognizes the region of Somaliland as part of Somalia.

== History ==
In 2002, Germany considered recognising Somaliland and establishing a military base in the country. They did not do so and the naval base was instead established in Djibouti. German naval ships already operated from Berbera. In September 2012, at the mini-summit on Somalia on the margins of the United Nations General Assembly, the German government re-affirmed its continued support for Somalia's government, territorial integrity and sovereignty. In 2019, the German ambassador to Kenya and Somalia visited Hargeisa and met with Muse Bihi Abdi.

== See also ==
- Foreign relations of Germany
- Foreign relations of Somaliland
