= Pamukbank =

Former Turkish bank (1955–2004)

- Type: Bank
- Industry: Banking
- Founded: 22 April 1955
- Defunct: 17 November 2004
- Headquarters: Istanbul, Turkey
- Products: Financial services

Pamukbank T.A.Ş. is a defunct Turkish bank. Founded in 1955 as a privately owned deposit bank, it was taken over by the government's TMSF in 2002, because of a $2.5bn capital shortfall, and merged into Halkbank in November 2004. At the time Pamukbank had 172 branches and 4000 employees.

Pamukbank was formerly owned by Çukurova Holding, and in 2013, Çukurova chairman Mehmet Emin Karamehmet was sentenced to seven years in prison for misuse of loans from Pamukbank.

== CEOs ==
- Hüsnü Özyeğin (1977–1984)
- Bülent Şenver (June 1987 – July 1993)
