= List of diplomatic missions in Somaliland =

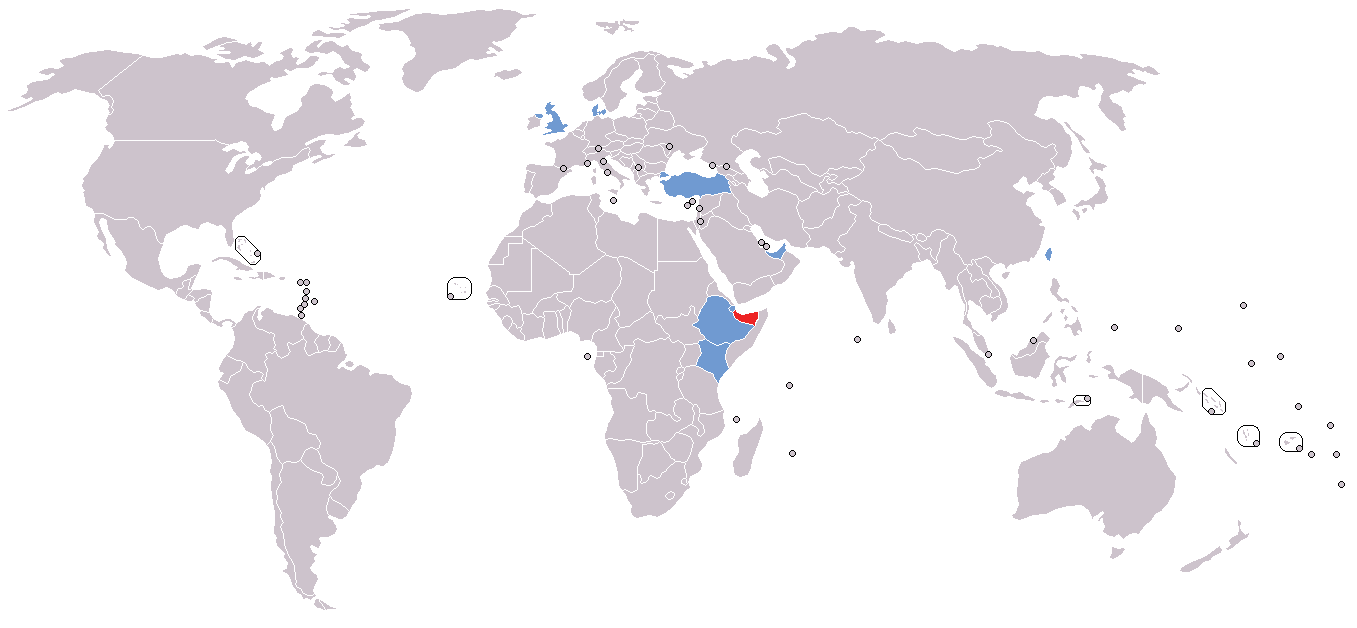
Map of diplomatic missions in Somaliland Somaliland States with consulate or representative office in Somaliland

This article lists the diplomatic missions in Somaliland, a de facto independent republic whose independence is not officially recognised by most member states of the United Nations or any other international organisation. The capital city of Hargeisa hosts no embassies of UN member states, but at least three consulates and a number of liaison offices. Israel became the first UN member state to formally recognise its independence in December 2025 and is expected to open an embassy in Somaliland.

== Diplomatic missions in Hargeisa ==
=== Embassies ===
Sending country	Ref.
Israel	

=== Other missions ===
Sending country	Mission	Ref.
Denmark	Programme Office	
Djibouti	Consulate General	
Ethiopia	Consulate General	
Kenya	Liaison Office	
Taiwan	Representative Office	
Turkey	Consulate General	
United Arab Emirates	Commercial Office	
United Kingdom	Office	

== See also ==
- Foreign relations of Somaliland
- List of diplomatic missions of Somaliland
