= Taiwan Representative Office, Hargeisa =

Interests representative of Taiwan in Somaliland

Taiwan Representative Office in Somaliland
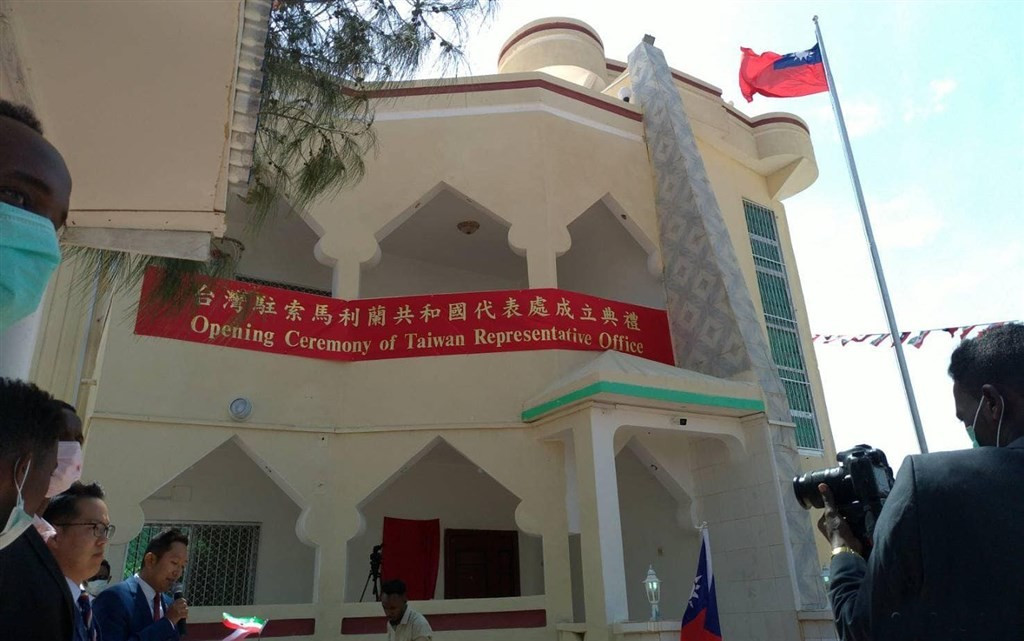
- Location: Hargeisa, Somaliland
- Address: Sha'ab Area, Rd. No. 1, near Ministry of Endowment and Religious Affairs, Hargeisa
- Coordinates: 9.5617363°N 44.0460742°E
- Opened: August 17, 2020
- Ambassador: Allen Chenhwa Lou
- Website: www.roc-taiwan.org/smd_en/index.html

The Taiwan Representative Office in the Republic of Somaliland (Chinese: 臺灣駐索馬利蘭共和國代表處; pinyin: Táiwān zhù Suǒmǎlìlán Gònghéguó Dàibiǎochù) is the representative office of the Republic of China (Taiwan) in the Republic of Somaliland, which functions as a substantial embassy.

== Introduction ==
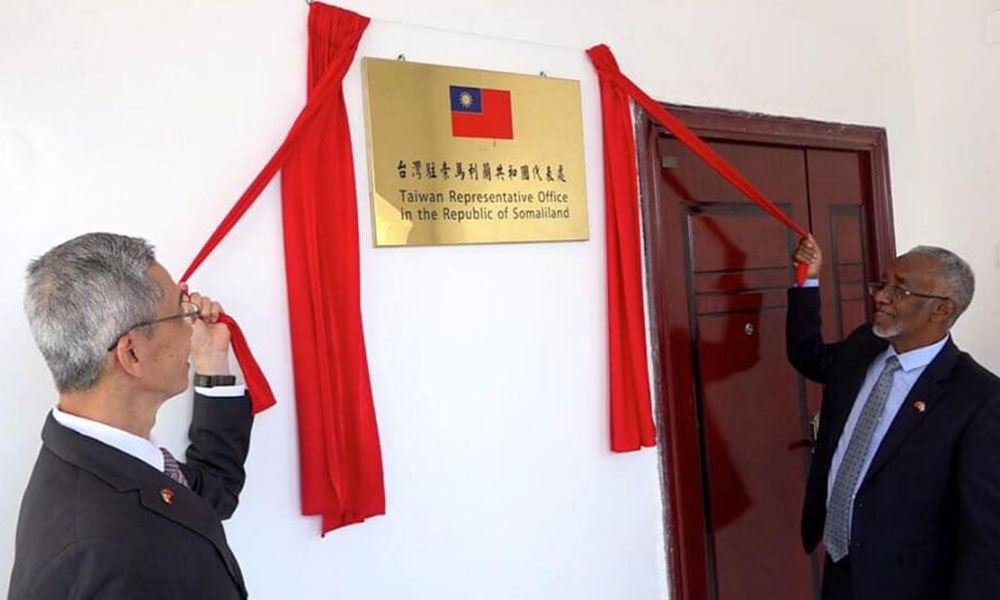
Inauguration of the Representative Office in 2020.

On August 17, 2020, the inauguration ceremony of the representative office was held in the capital of Somaliland, Hargeisa. The ceremony was co-hosted by Allen Chenhwa Lou, the Taiwanese representative to Somaliland, and the foreign minister of Somaliland, Yasin Haji Mohamoud. The Ministry of Foreign Affairs of Taiwan took the video link to give speeches, and signed a bilateral technical cooperation agreement with Yasin Haji Mohamoud simultaneously. The unveiling ceremony first played the President Tsai Ing-wen pre-recorded congratulatory video, and then Joseph Wu, the foreign minister of Taiwan, gave a speech through a video connection. About 50 dignitaries attended the ceremony including the heads of Somaliland's ministries of finance, of planning and development, as well as the Department of Immigration, the president of the Central Bank, parliamentarians and personnel from diplomatic missions in Somaliland.

Wu said in a speech that since 2009, Taiwan and Somaliland have cooperated in the fields of medical and health, education and maritime security. After the official operation of the representative office, the cooperation between the two countries will continue to expand and deepen. US Department of Health Chief Azar praised during his recent visit to Taiwan, "Taiwan is indeed an important friend of the United States at this difficult time." Taiwan will also adhere to this belief to communicate with Somaliland, and continue to cooperate with partners with similar ideas to jointly promote regional stability and prosperity. In his speech, Mu Yassin thanked the Taiwanese government and people for their contributions and efforts to strengthen the relationship between the two countries. He pointed out that with the increasing international importance of the Horn of Africa, the Red Sea, and the Gulf of Aden region, now is the best time for Taiwan to strengthen bilateral economic and trade relations on the basis of mutual benefit.

Minister Wu and Foreign Minister Mohamoud signed the "Technical Cooperation Agreement between the Government of the Republic of China (Taiwan) and the Government of the Republic of Somaliland" by video on behalf of the governments of the two countries after the unveiling ceremony. The consortium International Cooperation and Development Foundation will set up the "Taiwan Technical Mission in Somaliland" in Somaliland to continue to deepen the Taiwan-Somaliland partnership of mutual benefit and common prosperity.

== See also ==
- Republic of Somaliland Representative Office in Taiwan
- Somaliland–Taiwan relations
- List of diplomatic missions of Taiwan
- List of diplomatic missions in Somaliland
