= Bülent Şenver =

Turkish banker and lecturer in finance

Bulent Şenver
- Born: Ankara, Turkey
- Education: Accounting and Finance
- Alma mater: Boğaziçi University
- Occupations: Banker, lecturer
- Website: www.bulentsenver.net

Bulent Şenver is a Turkish banker and lecturer in finance.

== Education ==
Bulent Şenver graduated from the Accounting and Finance Department of the Administrative Sciences Faculty at Boğaziçi University. He has been through various trainings in the fields of independent auditing, managerial skills and banking in London, Birmingham, Chicago, Houston, Washington, D.C., Paris, Brussels and Geneva. Senver shares his business and leadership experiences in Turk Leader Center in his special room.

== Career ==
He started to work in the audit division of Arthur Andersen's London office and then, took position in the same company's Istanbul office. As independent auditor and management consultant, he worked for more than twenty Turkish and foreign banks in Turkey during different periods. In order to develop an off-site banking surveillance and an early warning system to be used by the Central Bank of the Turkey, he made studies at Bank of England, Banque de France and Federal Deposit Insurance Corporation (USA). Following his return to Turkey, he worked as the project manager and consultant for the Central Bank of Turkey for the preparation of "Off-Site Surveillance System", "Transparent Banking", "Uniform Chart of Accounts", "Early Warning System" and "Uniform Reporting Package" projects for the Turkish Banks.

Şenver left Arthur Andersen Istanbul office in May 1985, after eleven years of service, when he was an experienced manager, to join "Uluslararasi Endüstri ve Ticaret Bankasi A.S." (Interbank), one of the most reputable banks in Turkey, as a deputy general manager.

He was appointed as the President and Chief Executive Officer (CEO) of Pamukbank in June 1987, Turkey's third largest private bank, in which there is no government participation. From June 1987 to July 1993, in six years, he grew the balance sheet footings of the bank 36 (thirty six) times. With his new bank strategy and mission statement, the bank became one of the best three banks in Turkey in the fields of retail banking and electronic banking services. He improved the image of the bank with new products and services and giving importance to innovation, customer care and quality of service.

During his CEO position in Pamukbank, he also acted as a member of the board of directors of Pamukbank, Bank Kreiss A.G., Türkiye Genel Sigorta A.S., Baytur Insaat Taahhut A.S., Turk Henkel A.S., Kimyateks A.S., Aksan A.S., Pamuk Factoring A.S. and Pamukbank Pension Fund. During the same period, he was also appointed as the statutory auditor of the Turkish Bankers Association and served for six years in the board. In August 1992, he was awarded the "Accountant and Financial Consultant Practicing Certificate".

Şenver left Pamukbank in July 1993 to establish a bank in Northern Cyprus called Denizbank Ltd. He acted as the chairman of the board of directors and managing director of the bank until he sold his shares in September 1998. He is acting as financial advisor and strategic consultant to various companies, banks and other financial institutions.

== Awards ==
The Turkish Press Institution elected Bülent Şenver as the "Man of the Year" in 1987 and gave him the "Hakkı Tarık Uz Man of the Year Award".

The prominent economic and financial monthly magazine Kapital, named Bülent Şenver as the "Banker of the Year 1990". During the same year, he was also elected as the "Man of the Year 1990" by another magazine called Cosmopolitan Turkey. Cosmopolitan Turkey gave this award to him due to his "creativeness, innovations and his ability to develop new banking products and services".

In its traditional yearly inquiry, the Kapital magazine's grand jury that was composed of 47 leading businessmen, executive managers, bankers and economists of Turkey, elected Bülent Şenver again for the second time as the "Banker of the Year 1991".

== Associations ==
He became a member of the "Turkish Accountants Association" in 1985 and acted as "Discipline Committee Member" of the association.

In August 1992, Şenver was awarded the "Accountant and Financial Consultant Practicing Certificate" (SMMM).

Şenver served as the chairman of the board of directors of Turkish American Business Association (TABA-AmCham) and as a board member of the European Council of American Chambers of Commerce (ECACC) and a member of the Executive Committee of ECACC and the Treasurer of ECACC for five years from 1994 to 2000.

Şenver is a member of the Turkish Industrialists' and Businessmen's Association (TUSIAD). He is an active member of TUSIAD Banking Committee and Economic and Financial Affairs Committee. He is a founding member of "Turkish Ethics Values Center Foundation " (TEDMER). He is acting as financial advisor and consultant to various companies and financial institutions.

Bülent Şenver is the founder of “Turklider Merkezi” (Turk Leader Center), a special platform established to develop and improve the leadership skills of young Turks. He is also the founder of "Books for Everyone" foundation, established to improve love of books in the country. He is also the founder of "Ethics Center" association in Turkey, established to improve ethical awareness in Turkey.

== Teaching ==
He is a part-time lecturer in the Business Administration Department of Boğaziçi University. From 1985 without any interruption, he gave courses as a part-time lecturer on auditing, cost accounting, asset and liability management in commercial banks, bank management and business ethics. Şenver is also giving electronic banking and asset & liability management courses at Istanbul Bilgi University and Istanbul Kültür University for the MBA programme.

Furthermore, within the training programs scope of the Turkish Bankers Association, from 1983 to 2000 for 17 years, he gave lectures, seminars and conferences on topics such as profit improvement in banks, asset and liability management in banks, internal auditing in banks and balance sheet analysis of banks in Istanbul, Ankara and İzmir on several occasions. He also wrote a book called How to Analyse Bank Financial Statements.

== Books ==
=== Authored ===
- Banka Bilanco Analizi (Bank Balance Sheet Analysis)
- Kulaginiza Kupe Olsun (Be Taught a Lesson): This book is a collection of advices, jokes, do's and don'ts from famous Turkish businessman and businesswomen to young managers. Stories told in the book are more than just text book lessons. They are real-life stories that can be a guide to young talented, eager managers on their way to success.
- Genclere Mektup (Letters to Youngsters): This book includes leadership hints and advises of a Turkish businessman.
- BAŞARDİN Başarı Hapı (Success Pill) : This book includes hints for success in business life. It contains actual business stories os a bank CEO who was elected as "The Innovative Banker of the Year".
