= Tercüman Building =

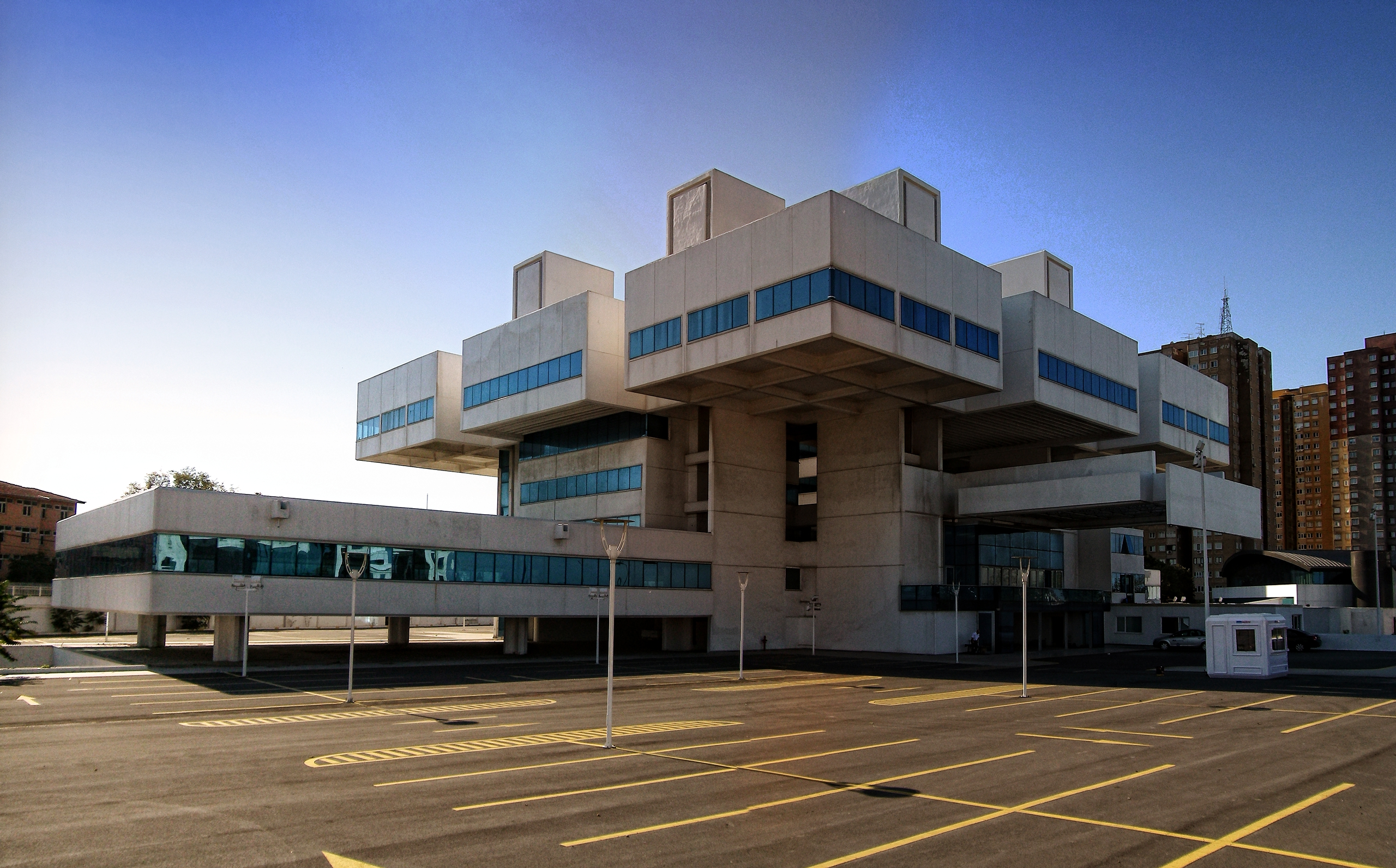
- The Tercüman Building before its demolition
- Interactive map of the Tercüman Building area

General information
- Status: Demolished
- Location: Zeytinburnu, Istanbul, Turkey
- Coordinates: 41°0′43″N 28°54′36″E
- Demolished: 2023

The Tercüman Building (Tercüman Newspaper Printing and Administration Facilities) was a building in the Zeytinburnu district of Istanbul, Turkey. It was built in 1974 on the State road D.100 by Tercüman newspaper.

It was an iconic building that has played an important part in 20th-century Turkish architecture narratives with its unorthodox form. The building was designed by Günay Çilingiroğlu and Muhlis Tunca, and its static project was designed by Rasin Etiman. The building had different owners throughout the years. In 2023, due to an earthquake risk, it was demolished through the decision of the property owners.

== History ==
The building was obtained through a project as a result of an invited competition held by Tercüman Newspaper and Printing in 1972. Construction was completed in 1974. The process of moving into the building continued until the middle of 1976.

The building had several owners throughout the years, and was used by establishments such as the Anadolu Agency and the Press Release Institution. Its latest name was the Toyota Plaza.

The Tercüman newspaper building was placed under protection, due to its architectural value, by the Istanbul Regional Culture and Nature Protection Institution, in 2010. In 2012, the protection was lifted due to "[the building] not carrying importance in regards to its historical, archeological, environmental or other features". It was demolished according to the decision of the property owners in 2023.

== Architectural features ==
The structure consisted of 3 blocks. The first block consisted of the lowest three floors, housing functions such as shelter, central, basement, printing house, and entrance. The second block contained mezzanine floors housing editorial offices, and the administration and social units of the newspaper. The last two floors were dedicated to the upper management, companies, and cafeteria functions.

The main entrance was located on the northwest facade facing the E5 highway. There was a service entrance on the southeast facade facing Gümüşsuyu Davutpaşa Street. Additionally, there were ramp entrances in the basement where papers are brought in and newspapers are distributed.

== Reaction to its demolition ==
Former branch chair of the Istanbul Union of Chambers of Turkish Engineers and Architects, Esin Köymen, expressed that the Tercüman Building was one of the most special buildings of its age, that he thought that it would be replaced by a tall building and that important values were lost for the sake of real estate and profit.
