= Tercüman =

Turkish newspaper (1955–2010)

- Type: Daily newspaper
- Owner: TürkMedya
- Founded: 26 May 1955
- Ceased publication: 24 June 2010
- Political alignment: center-right
- Language: Turkish
- Website: www.tercuman.com

Tercüman: Halka ve Olaylara was a Turkish daily newspaper. It was founded in 1955 by Kemal Ilıcak (1932–1993), and associated with the center-right. It was based in the now demolished Tercüman Building. It was temporarily closed down by the military authorities between 11 August and 3 September 1983 during martial law in Turkey. Ayhan Songar published weekly columns in the paper between 1986 and 1989. Another contributor of the paper was Nevzat Yalçıntaş.

Tercüman closed after Ilıcak's death, and the name was acquired by the Çukurova Media Group in 1997. In 2003 Ilıcak's family (including Kemal's son, Mehmet Ali Ilıcak) attempted to resurrect the paper, and a dispute with Çukurova over naming rights saw Çukurova hastily launch a daily newspaper named Tercüman in January 2003, on the same day as the Ilıcaks' Dünden Bugüne Tercüman appeared. Çukurova suffered during the 2008 financial crisis, and closed down its Tercüman in 2010. Dünden Bugüne Tercüman was renamed Bugün in 2005.
