= Mohamed Omar Hagi Mohamoud =

Somalilander diplomat (born 1981

Mohamed Hagi

1st Ambassador of Somaliland to Israel
- Incumbent
- Assumed office February 2026
- Preceded by: Position established

Advisor to the President for Foreign Affairs and International Cooperation
- Incumbent
- Assumed office 14 January 2025
- President: Abdirahman Mohamed Abdullahi

1st Chief Representative of Somaliland to Taiwan
- In office 23 June 2020 – 12 January 2025
- President: Muse Bihi Abdi
- Preceded by: Position established
- Succeeded by: Mahmoud Adam Jama Galaal

Personal details
- Born: Hargeisa, Somali Democratic Republic (now Somaliland)
- Citizenship: Somaliland, United Kingdom
- Spouse: Samira Obsiye
- Children: 5
- Education: Manchester Metropolitan University (PhD); University of Warwick (BA, PGCert, MA)
- Profession: Diplomat, politician, academic staff
- Mohamed Omar Hagi Mohamoud on X Mohamed Omar Hagi Mohamoud on Facebook

Mohamed Omar Hagi Mohamoud (Somali: Maxamed Cumar Xaaji Maxamuud; Arabic: محمد عمر حاج محمود; born January 1981), also known as Mohamed Hagi, is a Somalilander diplomat, politician and academic currently serving as the First Ambassador Extraordinary and Plenipotentiary of the Republic of Somaliland to Israel. Appointed in February 2026, he is the inaugural head of the Somaliland embassy in Jerusalem the Advisor to the President for Foreign Affairs and International Cooperation. He previously served as the inaugural Representative of Somaliland to Taiwan from 2020 to 2025, where he established the first diplomatic presence of Somaliland in East Asia.

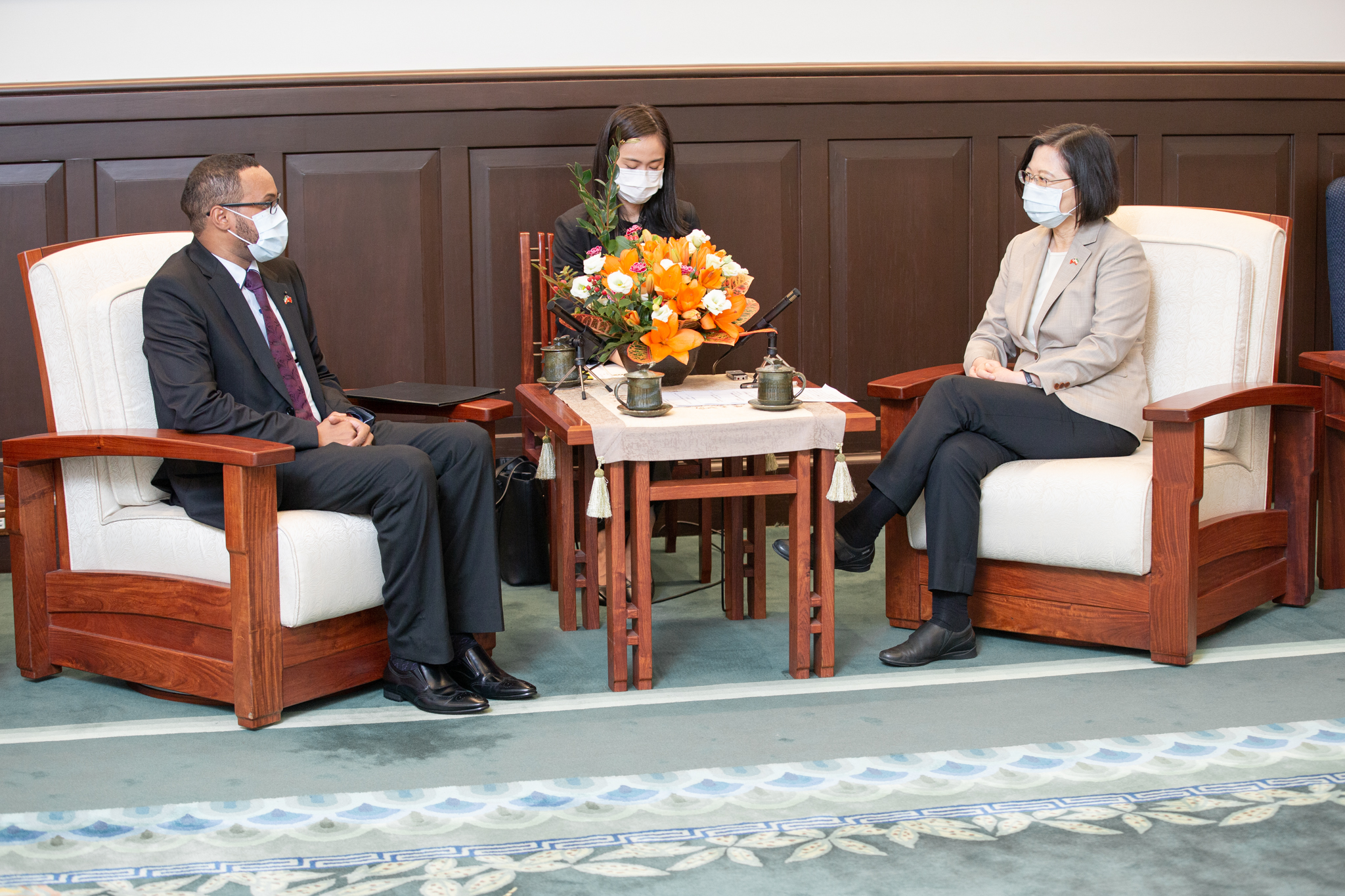
Mohamed Omar Hagi Mohamoud (left) meeting with Taiwanese President Tsai Ing-wen (right) on the morning of October 12, 2020.

Prior foreign diplomatic posting, Mohamed was a Senior Political Adviser at the Ministry of Foreign Affairs and International Cooperation of the Republic of Somaliland. He also served the Ministry of Finance Development as a Senior Policy Adviser on strategic planning and the macroeconomic policy reform. Prior to his public career, Mohamed worked as an Executive Director, Programme Manager and a senior policy adviser for international and United Nations agencies in Somaliland and abroad.

== Formal education and early life ==
Mohamed was born and raised in Hargeisa. He began his early Mal'amad Qur'an and primary schooling in 1986 in Hargeisa, which was disrupted by the Somali Civil War in 1988. Mohamed continued his primary and intermediate formal education from Sheikh Madar and Biyo Dha'ay schools soon after Somaliland restored its sovereignty from the union with Somalia in 1991. Mohamed studied business administration and project management at local colleges in Hargeisa. He is later sponsored by his wife to the United Kingdom and started his higher education where he studied political science, security studies, and international development and philosophy.

Mohamed obtained all his higher education degrees in the United Kingdom. He did his PhD in Politics and International Relations at Manchester Metropolitan University. He subsequently attended the University of Warwick where he completed his BA Honours in Political Science, a Postgraduate Degree in Security Studies and a Masters Degree in Politics and International Studies.

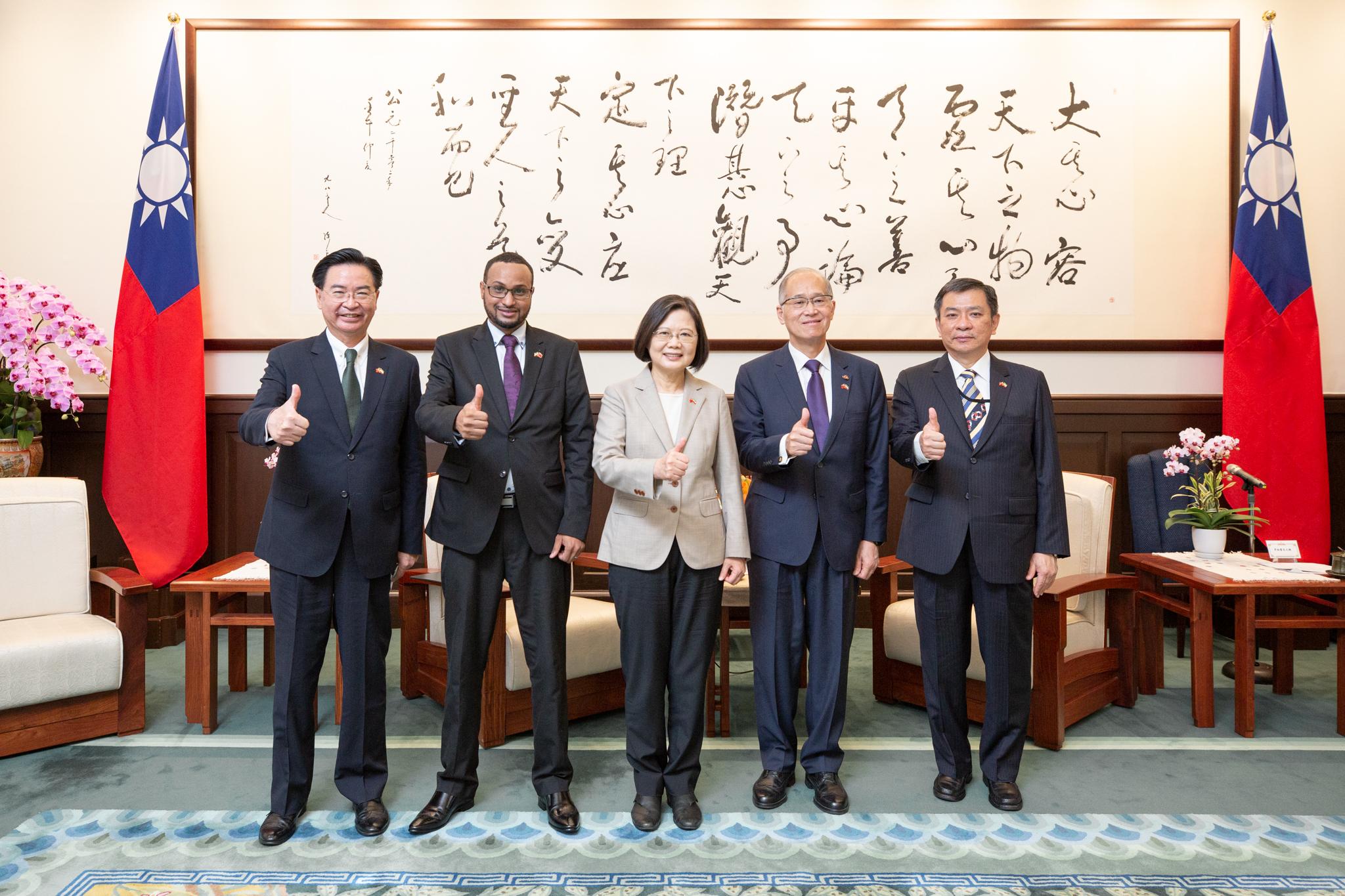
Mohamed Omar Hagi Mohamoud with the top leaders of Taiwan, including President Tsai Ing-wen, and the Foreign Minister Joseph Wu

== Ambassador to Israel ==
In February 2026, Hagi was appointed as the first Somaliland Ambassador in Israel, and presented his credentials to President Herzog on May 18.

== Higher education ==
- PhD, Manchester Metropolitan University.
- M.A., University of Warwick.
- PGCert, University of Warwick.
- B.A., University of Warwick.

== Career ==
=== Representative to Taiwan ===
Mohamoud served as the Somaliland Representative to Taiwan from 2020 to 2025, where he was given the title of Ambassador by the Somaliland Foreign Ministry and served as their first Representative to the ROC.

=== Ambassador to Israel ===
Somaliland President, Abdirahman Mohamed Abdullahi, appointed Hagi as Ambassador Extraordinary and Plenipotentiary to Israel. Following Israel's official acceptance of his appointment in February 2026, Hagi became the first Somalilander to hold the office. Hagi was crucial in transforming the Israel - Somaliland relationship from a discreet engagement to a full diplomatic partnership. He was recognized by Israel as a key architect of the 2025 recognition of Somaliland by Israel. His role as ambassador includes progressing maritime security cooperation, managing technology exchanges and high-level diplomatic tasks. As Ambassador, Hagi, in accordance with the Constitution of the Republic of Somaliland, has been vested with full authority, privileges, rights, and responsibilities pertaining to the diplomatic post.

Hagi has committed to strengthening strategic ties, creating new opportunities and pursuing a forward-looking vision to increase Somaliland's global presence. He stressed that the partnership with Israel will build on a foundation of cooperation within security, the economy, technology and diplomacy to ensure mutual benefits, regional stability and prosperity.

== Academic career ==
Mohamed is a political analyst, and contributes to both Somali and English-speaking media and newspapers. He also published articles on globalization, policy papers on Africa and global trading system, ethnic conflicts in Africa as well as elements of good governance and foreign aid. Other areas of published opinion articles include the homegrown Somaliland peace-building and democracy as well as theories of foreign aid dependency in the least-developed countries. Mohamed worked on his first book on Turkey's Strategic Advantage in Sub-Saharan Africa.

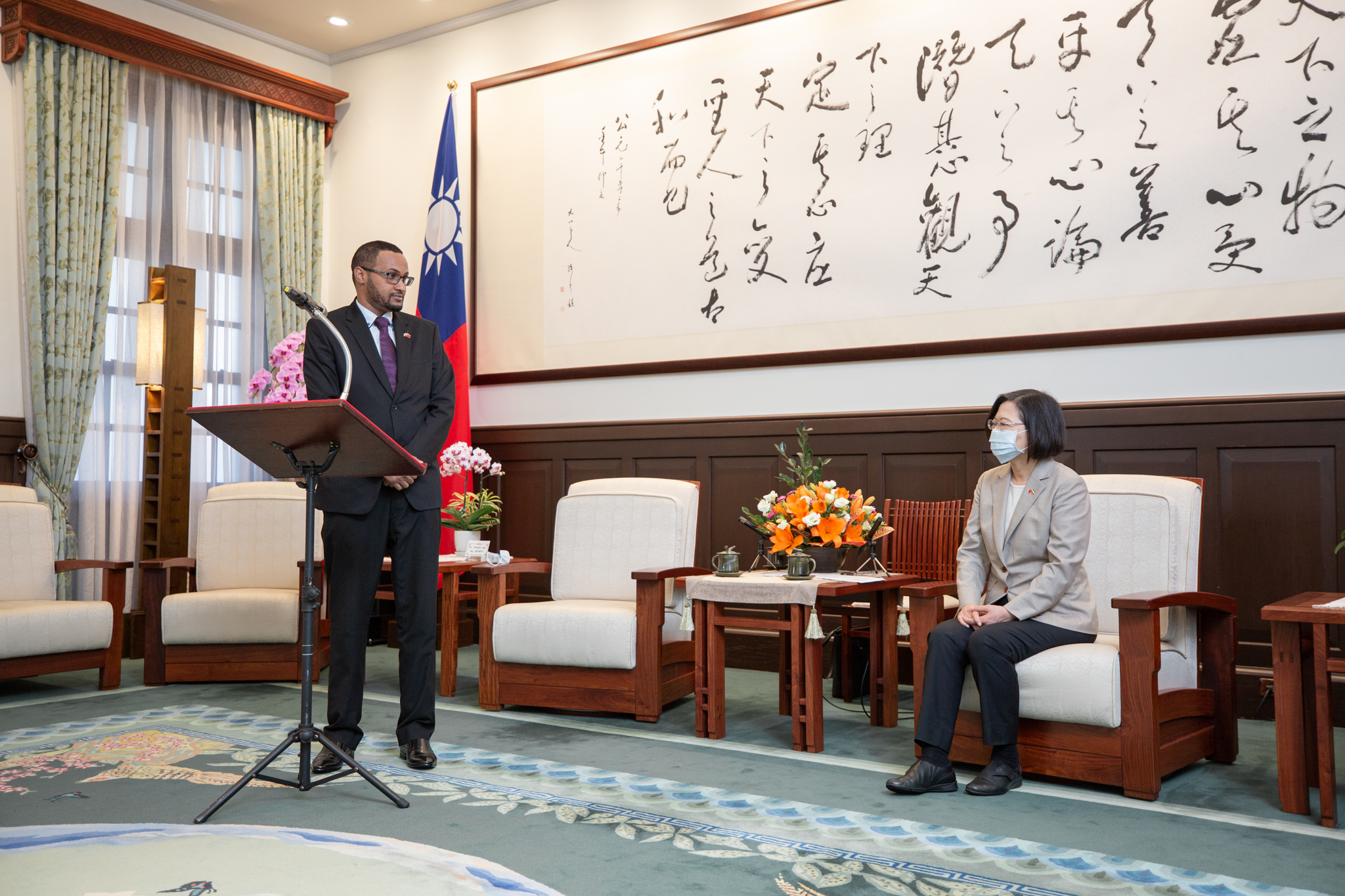
Mohamed Omar Hagi Mohamoud presenting remarks to President Tsai Ing-wen

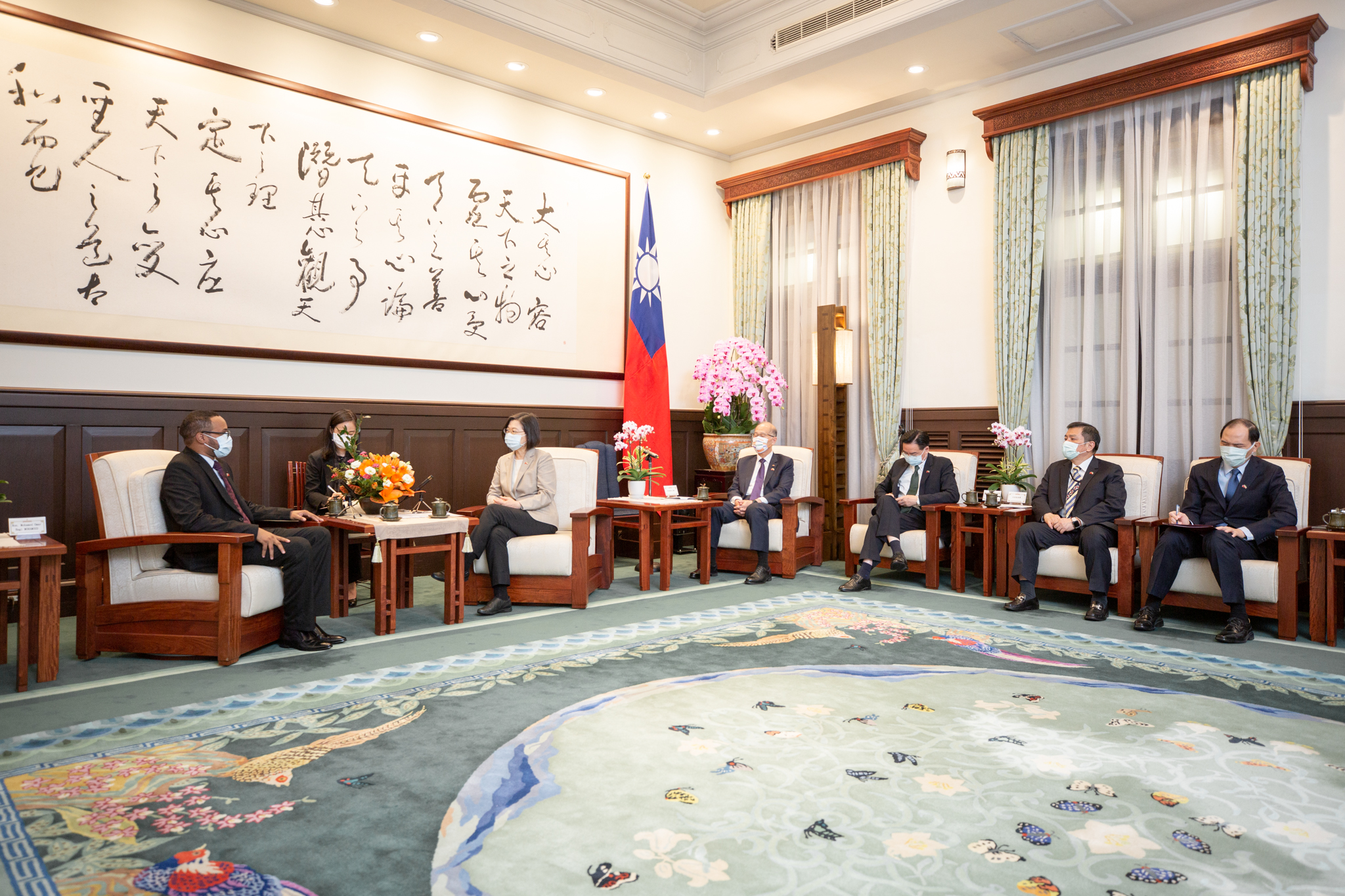
Mohamed Omar Hagi Mohamoud with President Tsai Ing-wen at the Presidency
