= Mission of Somaliland, London =

Diplomatic mission of the Somaliland in the United Kingdom

Coordinates: 51.50868°N 0.06951°W

Mission of Somaliland in London
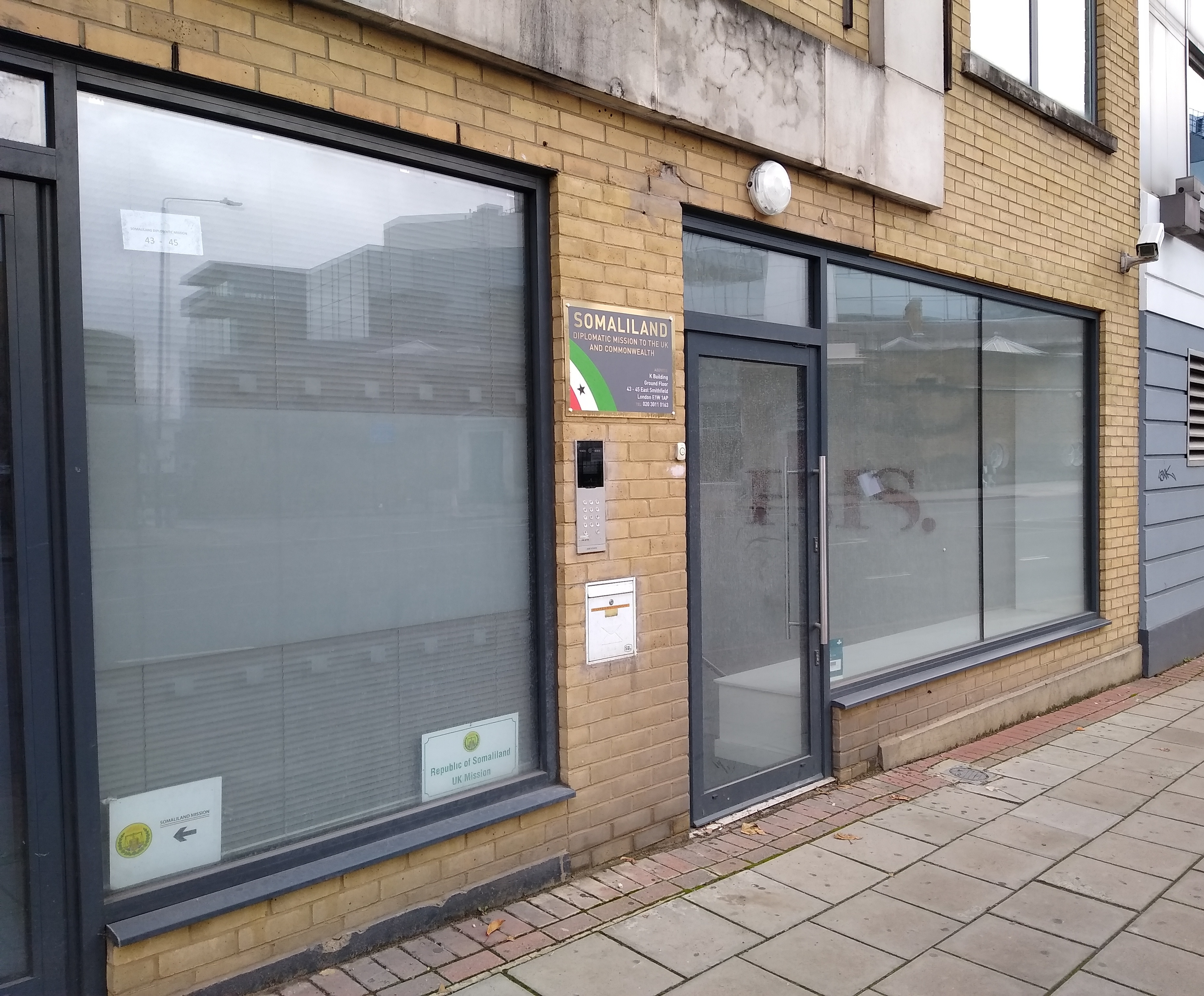
- Diplomatic mission of Somaliland in Smithfield, London
- Location: East Smithfield, London
- Address: 43-45 East Smithfield, London E1W 1AP
- Ambassador: Abdi Abdullahi Hersi
- Website: somaliland-mission.com

The Mission of Somaliland, officially the Somaliland Diplomatic Mission to the UK and Commonwealth in Whitechapel, London is the diplomatic mission of the Republic of Somaliland in the United Kingdom. The mission was established in 1991, shortly after Somaliland's unilateral declaration of independence from Somalia.

The mission is not a fully-fledged embassy because the United Kingdom does not have official ties with Somaliland; however, it is the highest-level representation of the Government of Somaliland in the United Kingdom. It acts largely like any other embassy, issuing visas and passports, and representing Somalilanders in the UK.

== List of representatives ==
- 2010–2016: Ali Adan Awale
- 2016–2019: Ayan Mohamoud Ashour
- 2019–present: Abdi Hersi

== See also ==
- List of representative offices of Somaliland
