= List of representative offices of Somaliland =

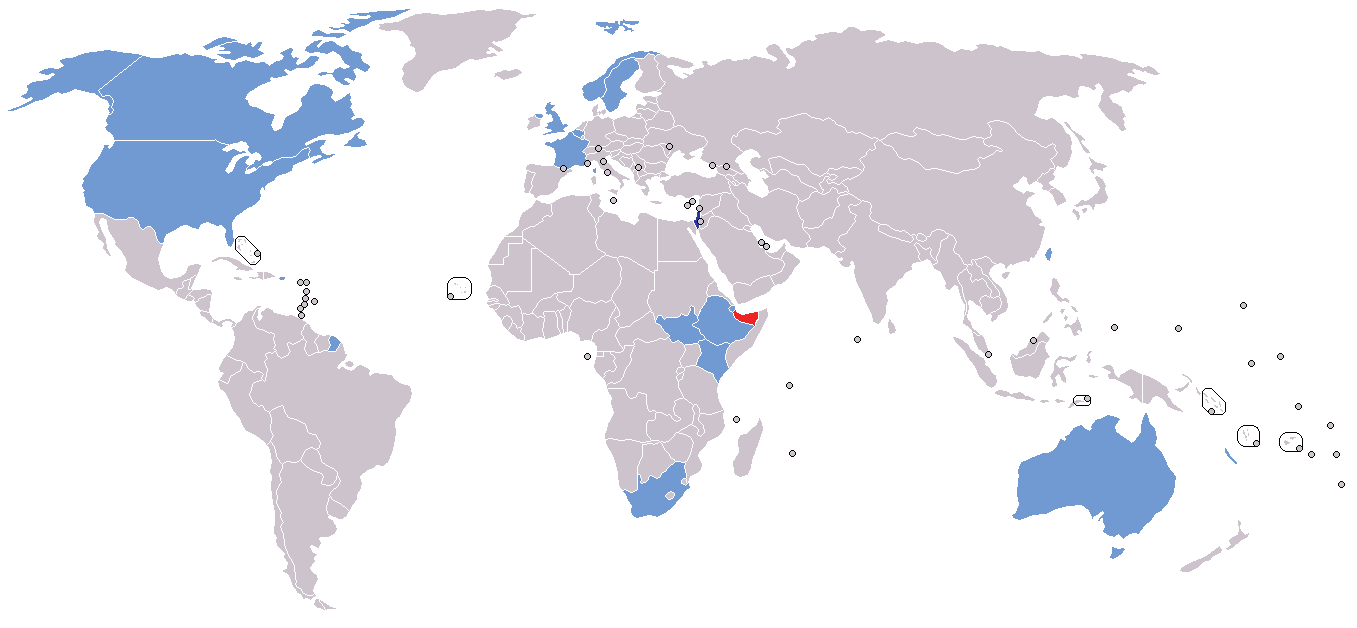
Map of diplomatic missions of Somaliland Somaliland Countries hosting a Somaliland embassy Countries hosting a Somaliland representative office

This is a list of diplomatic missions of Somaliland in other countries. Somaliland is a de facto independent republic whose independence is not officially recognised by most member states of the United Nations or any other international organisations. The government of Somaliland maintains informal ties with some foreign governments and has a small network of representative offices abroad. These missions do not have formal diplomatic status under the provisions of the Vienna Convention on Diplomatic Relations. Israel became the first UN member state to formally recognise its independence in December 2025 and Somaliland opened its embassy to Israel in Jerusalem in June 2026.

== Africa ==
- Ethiopia
  - Adis Abeba (Representative Office)
- Kenya
  - Nairobi (Mission)
- South Africa
  - Pretoria (Representative Office)
- South Sudan
  - Juba (Representative Office)

== Americas ==
- Canada
  - Ottawa (Representative Office)
- United States
  - Alexandria (Mission)

== Asia ==
- Israel
  - Jerusalem (Embassy)
- United Arab Emirates
  - Dubai (Trade Office)
- Taiwan
  - Taipei (Representative Office)
- Turkey
  - Ankara (Representative Office)
- Saudi Arabia
  - Riyadh (Representative Office)
- Yemen
  - Sanaa (Representative Office)

== Europe ==
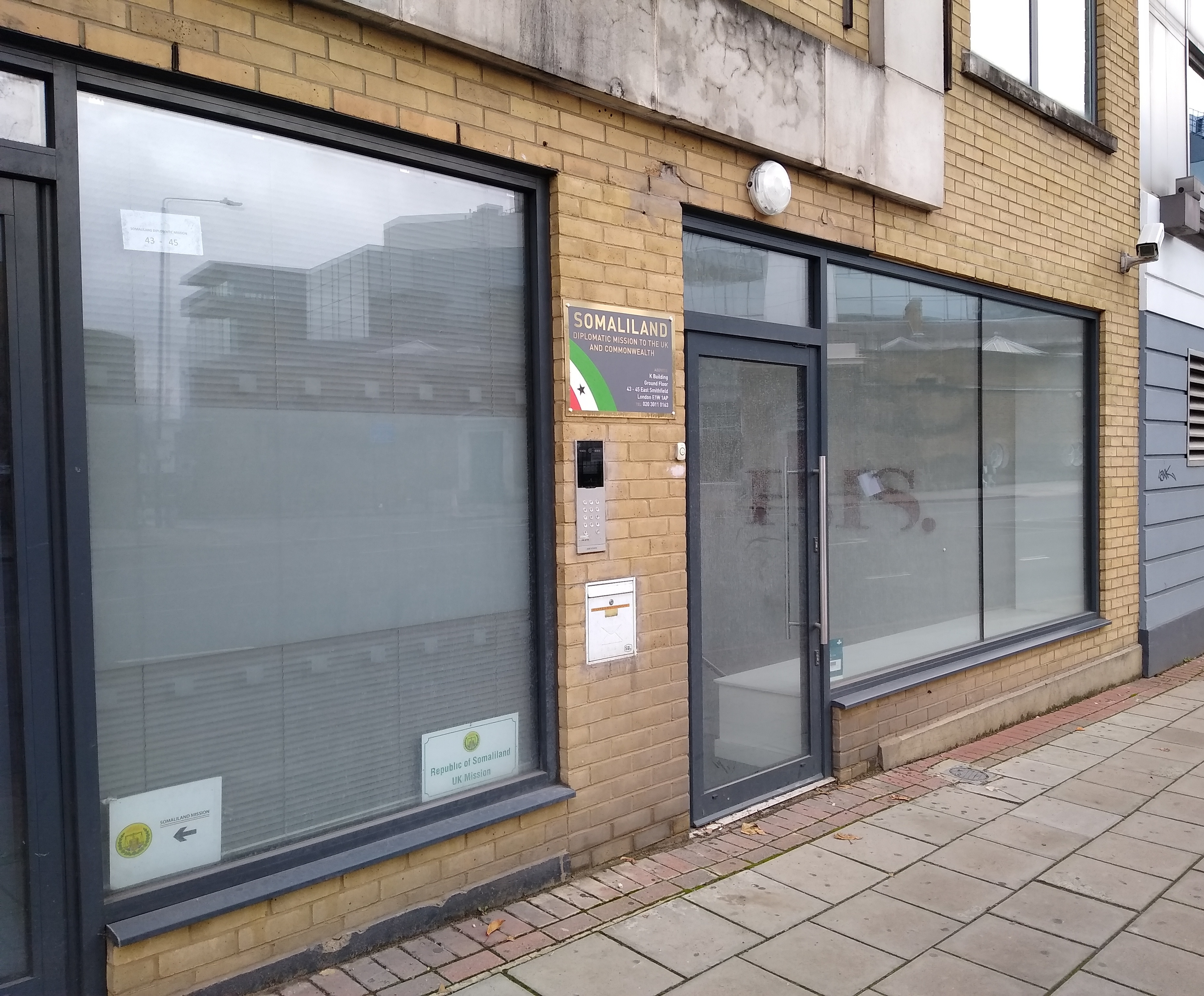
Somaliland Diplomatic Mission to the UK and Commonwealth, London

- United Kingdom
  - London (Diplomatic Mission)
- Norway
  - Oslo (Representative Office)
- France
  - Paris (Representative Office)
- Belgium
  - Brussels (Representative Office)
- Netherlands
  - Amsterdam (Representative Office)
- Sweden
  - Stockholm (Representative Office)

== Oceania ==
- Australia
  - Canberra (Representative Office)

== Closed missions ==
- Djibouti
  - Djibouti City (Mission)

== See also ==
- Foreign relations of Somaliland
- List of diplomatic missions in Somaliland
