= Çukurova Holding =

Industrial and commercial conglomerate based in Turkey

- Company type: Private
- Industry: Communication/Corporate
- Founded: 1923 Tarsus, Mersin
- Founder: Mehmet Emin Karamehmet
- Headquarters: Barbaros Boulevard, Ortaköy, Çarşı, Beşiktaş, Istanbul, Turkey
- Key people: Mehmet Emin Karamehmet
- Number of employees: N/A
- Website: www.cukurovaholding.com.tr

Çukurova Holding, established in 1923, is an industrial and commercial conglomerate based in Turkey. It is engaged in a range of sectors such as industrial, construction, communication and IT, media, transportation, financial services and energy. Çukurova Holding managed its newspapers, magazines and radio stations under TurkMedya, in the Çukurova Media Group, but transferred most remaining media assets to the state TMSF in 2013, in settlement of a tax debt. Çukurova has been involved in litigation since 2005 over part-ownership of Turkcell.

== Media ==
On 18 May 2013 Çukurova Media Group transferred a substantial number of its properties to the state TMSF, in partial settlement of a tax debt. With various media properties closed down in previous years, it leaves Çukurova with few media assets.

== Digital TV broadcasting and services ==
Digiturk was incorporated as a digital platform in May 1999. Digiturk purchases, produces and packages Turkish content. The company also produces television movies and series for Turkmax and owns the rights to most of these productions. Digiturk provides its viewers with services such as Digiturk Mobil TV and Digiturk Web TV. It is a wholly owned subsidiary of Cukurova Group.

Cukurova provides technical broadcast infrastructure services for Show TV and other Cukurova Media Enterprises through Eksen. It also owns and operates Mepas as a media sales house in Turkey. Zedpas is another media marketing company for Show TV and ATV.

== Automotive ==
Çukurova owned BMC, one of Turkey's largest vehicle manufacturers, for 24 years. The company was established in 1964 in partnership with the British Motor Corporation, and was fully acquired by Çukurova in 1989. In 2013 BMC was passed to the TMSF in settlement of tax debts owed to the Turkish government.

Maysan Mando is a vehicle parts manufacturer established in 1969. It became a joint venture with the South Korean Mando Corporation in 1997.

== Construction ==
Construction and construction machinery (Cukurova Insaat Makinalari, Cukurova Ithalat, Cukurova Ziraat and Cukurova Makina Imalat),

== Other sectors ==
The Cukurova Group also operates in 4 other sectors:

- chemicals (Cukurova Kimya and Daussan Cukurova Kimaya),
- paper (Atkasan, Kaplamin, Ova Sca Packaging, Sca Packaging and Selkasan),
- steel pipe manufacturing (Noksel) and
- textiles (Cukurova Sanayi Isletmeleri).

== Former assets ==
- Pamukbank (taken over by the government's TMSF in 2002)
- Yapı ve Kredi Bankası (sold in 2005)
