= Representative Office of Somaliland, Taipei =

Representative office of Somaliland to the Republic of China

Republic of Somaliland Representative Office in Taiwan Xafiiska Wakiilka Jamhuuriyada Somaliland ee Taiwan
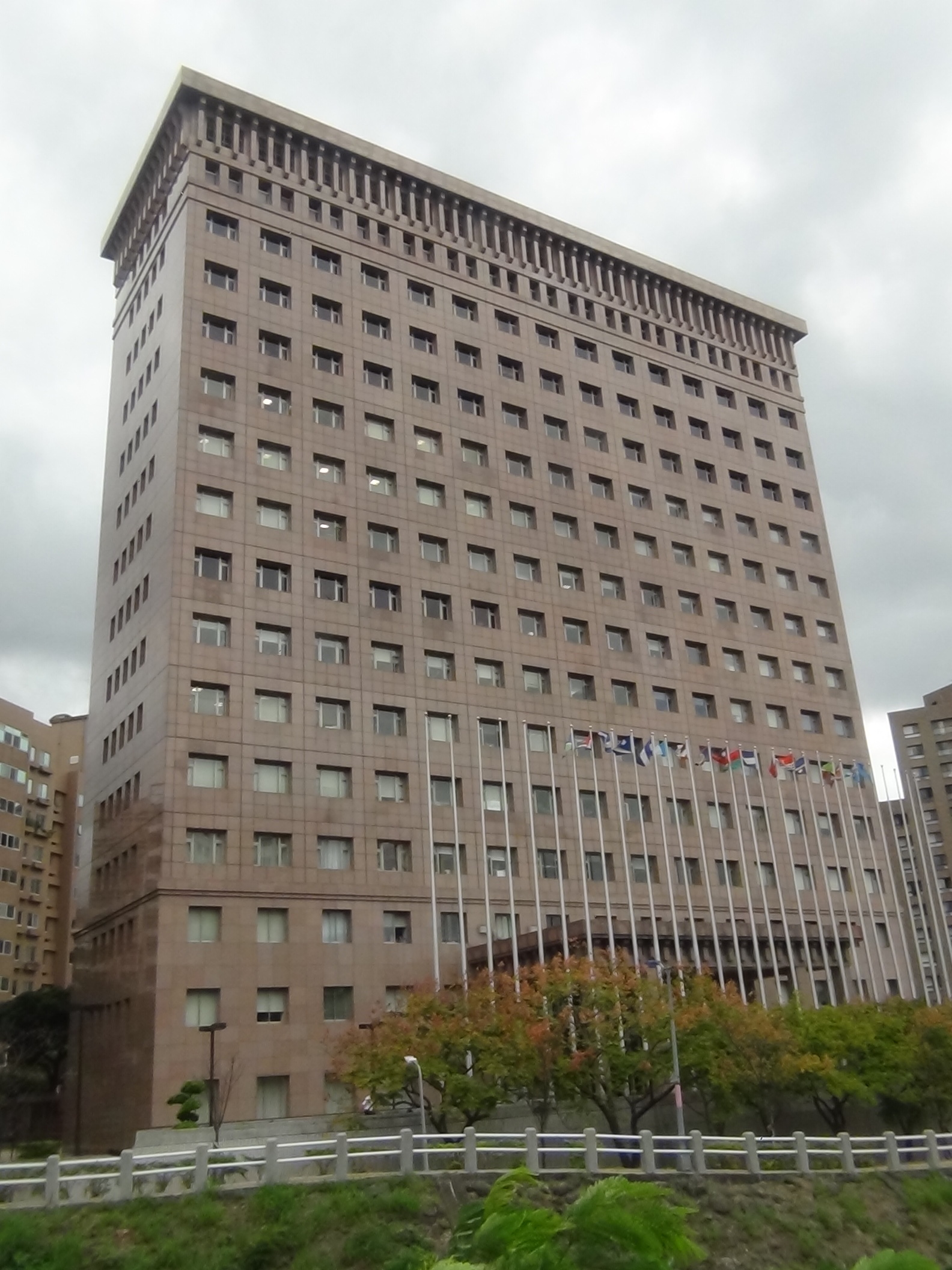
- The Representative Office of Somaliland at the Diplomatic Quarter
- Location: Taipei, Taiwan
- Address: 9F, No. 9, Lane 62, Tianmu W. Rd., Taipei City
- Coordinates: 25.081952°N 121.591838°E
- Ambassador: Mahmoud Adam Jama Galaal
- Website: somaliland.tw

The Republic of Somaliland Representative Office in the Republic of China (Taiwan) (Somali: Xafiiska Wakiilka Jamhuuriyadda Somaliland ee Taiwan; Chinese: 索馬利蘭共和國駐台灣代表處) is the representative office of the Republic of Somaliland in the Republic of China (Taiwan). It is the largest diplomatic mission of Somaliland in the East Asia region and serves Somaliland's interest in East Asia and Southeast Asia Region. The office was inaugurated on September 9, 2020, in an event held at Institute of Diplomacy and International Affairs (IDIA) in Taipei.

== History ==
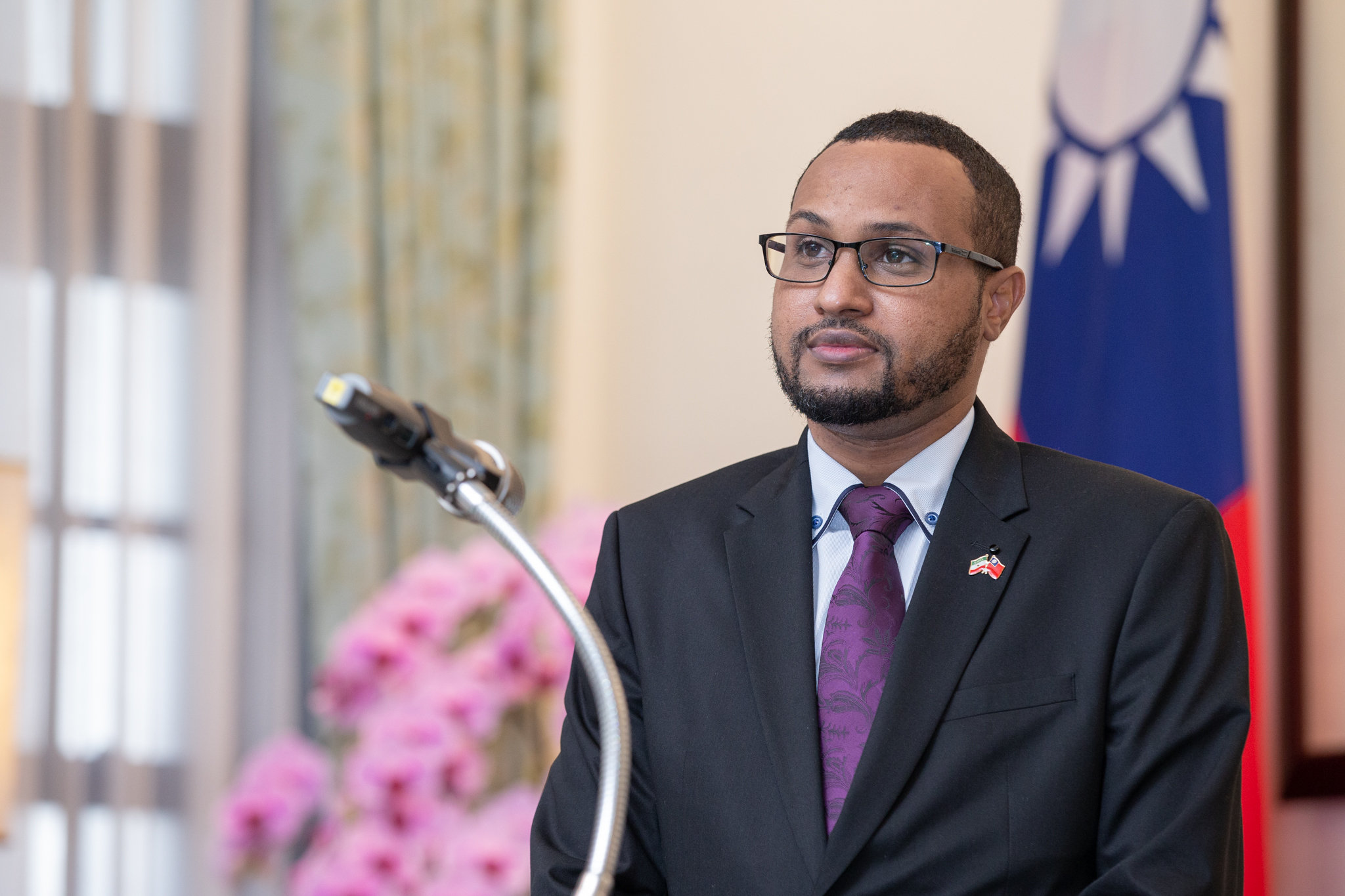
Somaliland's Chief Representative to Taiwan, Mohamed Omar Hagi Mohamoud in 2020

The Republic of Somaliland and the Republic of China (Taiwan) started diplomatic cooperation since 2009. Members of Somaliland Ministry of Foreign Affairs and International Cooperation visited Taiwan in late 2019 and early 2020 to discuss establishing official representative offices for both countries in the capital cities Hargeisa and Taipei.

The two countries announced an official relationship in July 2020 with Taiwan opened its office in the capital city of Somaliland, Hargeisa. A Somaliland representative office was also opened on September 9, 2020, the plaque-unveiling ceremony of the representative office was held at the Ministry of Foreign Affairs Institute of Diplomacy and International Affairs, but the office itself is located on Ningbo West Street in Taipei's Zhongzheng District. The launching ceremony was co-hosted by H.E. Amb. Mohamed Omar Hagi Mohamoud, Somaliland's chief representative to Taiwan, and H.E. Joseph Wu (吳釗燮), the Foreign Minister of Taiwan. The opening ceremony first played prerecorded congratulatory video from the President of Republic of Somaliland H.E. Muse Bihi Abdi, President Bihi commented that “both sides are motivated by a spirit of mutual assistance that will never expose any harm whatsoever to the interests of other countries, but rather contributes to international peace and regional economic activities”.

== Mission sections ==
The representative office has currently three sections:

- Political and General Affairs
- Development Cooperation and Cultural Affairs
- Economic and Commercial Affairs

== Heads of Mission ==
The office has both Somaliland and Taiwan staff. Amb Mohamed Omar Hagi Mohamoud was the Representative of Somaliland to Taiwan and the Chief of Mission until 2025. He was a Ph.D. researcher in Politics and Philosophy at Manchester Metropolitan University. Other notable staff include the Head of Development and Cultural Affairs, the Head of Economic and Commercial Affairs and the Executive Secretary.

== See also ==
- Somaliland–Taiwan relations
- List of diplomatic missions in Taiwan
- List of representative offices of Somaliland
