= World Alliance for Disaster Management =

World Alliance for Disaster Management (WADM)
- Member States Observer
- Membership: 13 member states 17 observers 11 partners: Member States：; Taiwan; Marshall Islands; Tuvalu; Palau; Belize; Guatemala; Haiti; Paraguay; Saint Kitts and Nevis; Saint Lucia; Saint Vincent and the Grenadines; Eswatini; Somaliland; ㅤ; Observer：; United States; Germany; Netherlands; Poland; United Kingdom; Japan; Philippines; Turkey

Leaders
- Hsiao Huan-chang
- Establishment: Taiwan
- September 19, 2026

World Alliance for Disaster Management (WADM) is an international organization to promote joint training and exercises, mutual assistance and information sharing, based in Taipei, Taiwan. WADW was announced by Taiwanese president Lai Ching-te at the opening of the Resilient Taiwan for Sustainable Democracy International Forum on 19 September 2026.

== Background ==
Taiwan (officially the Republic of China or ROC) is a member of several international organizations, but as a result of pressure from the People's Republic of China (PRC, commonly known as China), it has had been excluded from or downgraded in many organizations.

As of September 2026, there are three international bodies headquartered in Taiwan: the Food and Fertilizer Technology Center for the Asian and Pacific Region established in 1970, and the World Vegetable Center established in 1971, and WDAW.

== Membership ==
Members include 11 of Taiwan's diplomatic allies, along with Somaliland.

21 other members include United States, Japan, the United Kingdom, Germany, the Netherlands, Poland, Türkiye, and the Philippines.

Initiatives including establishing a major disaster response training hub for the Indo-Pacific at the National Fire Agency Training Center in Nantou County.
