= Mehmet Emin Karamehmet =

Turkish businessman

- Born: 1944 (age 81–82); Tarsus, Mersin, Turkey
- Education: Robert College, Dover College
- Occupation: Chairman of Çukurova Holding

Mehmet Emin Karamehmet (born 1 April 1944) is the chairman of Turkey's Çukurova Holding conglomerate. He was ranked the 2nd wealthiest person in Turkey and the 401st globally in 2012 Forbes Billionaires list. He is one of the most influential and successful businessmen in Turkey with a record of several returns after failures.

== Background ==
Karamehmet has graduated from Robert College and earned his Bachelors from Dover College, Kent UK, with a degree in Economics. After graduation, Karamehmet returned to his hometown Tarsus, where his father was the head of the local chamber of commerce, and established his first company with the capital of 100.000 TL. In the following years, he started to get more involved in the family company and initiated his own company, Cukurova Holding, which became a conglomerate through the years.

Current wealthiest man of Turkey according to Forbes Billionaires list Hüsnü Özyeğin is a classmate of Karamehmet. Karamehmet assigned him as the CEO of his bank at the age of 32, which made Özyeğin the youngest CEO of a Turkish bank and paved the way for his career. Karamehmet, via his holding company Cukurova, owns a share in the biggest telecommunication company Turkcell, which constitutes the largest share of his wealth.

== See also ==
- List of Turks by net worth
