= July 2025 Gaza Freedom Flotilla =

Attempt to break the Israeli blockade of the Gaza Strip

The July 2025 Gaza Freedom Flotilla was a civilian maritime mission organized by the Freedom Flotilla Coalition (FFC) to challenge the Israeli naval blockade of Gaza and deliver humanitarian aid. The ship Handala departed from Syracuse, Italy, on 13 July 2025, carrying a diverse group of activists, medics, lawyers, journalists, and humanitarian supplies. It made a stop in Gallipoli between 15 and 20 July, before heading to Gaza. Its entry in the Gaza territorial waters, initially estimated between 27 and 28 July, was expected for the early hours of 27 July. Israel boarded and seized the ship in international waters in the late hours of 26 July, before it could reach its destination, and arrested the members of the crew.

== Background ==
The Freedom Flotilla Coalition is an international network of grassroots organizations that has organized multiple missions to Gaza since 2010, aiming to break the Israeli blockade and draw global attention to the humanitarian crisis in the enclave. The July 2025 mission follows the interception of the coalition's previous vessel, Madleen, by Israeli forces in June 2025, during which volunteers including a member of the European Parliament and journalists were detained and deported.

After the October 7 attacks and during the ensuing Gaza war, Israel intensified its blockade on the Gaza Strip, labeling it as a total blockade denying the entry of food, water, medicine, fuel and electricity, causing high risk of famine and a humanitarian crisis that scholars have described as genocide. Due to Israeli checkpoints into Gaza which predate the October 7 attacks, the Israeli government and Israel Defense Forces (IDF) have controlled the entrance of humanitarian aid into Gaza, with aid delivery disrupted multiple times over the years, either via Israeli government blockades or Israeli civilian protests. Additionally, since March 2, 2025, very little humanitarian aid has been allowed into Gaza, with concerns about famine in Gaza being raised by the Integrated Food Security Phase Classification (IPC). Israel has announced that any action that leads to breaking the siege of Gaza will be met with failure.

For this mission the Freedom Flotilla Coalition is using the 20m long former Norwegian trawler Navaren/Navarn, MMSI 232061752, renamed as Handala after the iconic cartoon character created by Naji al-Ali, symbolizing Palestinian resistance and the right of return for Palestinian refugees.

== Mission and objectives ==
The Handala mission had the three primary objectives of breaking the blockade by sailing directly to Gaza in defiance of the Israeli naval blockade, which has been in place since 2007; of delivering aid such as food, medicine, and other humanitarian supplies to Gaza's besieged population; and of showing solidarity by amplifying the voices of Palestinians and highlight the role of international actors in sustaining or challenging the blockade.

The FFC stated: "We are not governments. We are people, taking action where institutions have failed. This mission is for the children of Gaza."

== Participants and support ==
On board the Handala were 21 members from multiple countries, including volunteer medics and health professionals, lawyers and human rights advocates, journalists and media workers, and social justice activists and community organizers.

Key:

Accompanied the crew in the Syracuse–Gallipoli leg

Participant	Country	Occupation	Previous related activity	Refs.
Vigdis Bjorvand	Norway	Cook; activist	Handala (2023) (Note: Previous voyages by the FFC's Handala include awareness-raising events in 2023 and 2024.); Conscience (May 2025); Madleen (June 2025)	
Yazan Eissa	Palestine; Romania	Handyman	Madleen (June 2025)	
Sergio Toribio Sánchez	Spain	Maritime engineer; activist	Madleen (June 2025)	
Hatem Aouini	Tunisia	Trade unionist; teacher	Soumoud Convoy (2025)	
Tania "Tan" Safi	Australia	Journalist; filmmaker	2024 attempt	
Braedon Peluso	USA	Mariner	2024 attempt	
Bob Suberi	USA; Israel	Activist	Handala (2023)	
Robert Martin	Australia	Activist	Freedom Flotilla III (2015)	
Caoimhe Butterly	Ireland	Activist	2010 mission	
Huwaida Arraf	USA; Israel	Activist; lawyer	2010 mission	
Christian "Chris" Smalls	USA	Labor organizer		
Jacob Berger	USA	Actor; activist		
Gabrielle Cathala	France	MP		
Emma Fourreau	France	MEP		
Justine Kempf	France	Nurse with MSF and Médecins du Monde		
Ange Sahuquet	France	Engineer; activist		
Santiago González Vallejo	Spain	Economist; trade unionist		
Waad Aal Musa	Iraq; USA	Al Jazeera journalist		
Mohamed El Bakkali	Morocco	Al Jazeera journalist		
Frank Romano	France; USA	Lawyer; academic; actor		
Chloé Fiona Ludden	France; UK	Scientist; former UN staffer		
Mohammed Mustafa	Australia; UK	Medical doctor who volunteered in Gaza		
Yipeng Ge	China; Canada	Medical doctor who volunteered in Gaza		
Antonio "Tony" La Piccirella	Italy	Mariner; activist		
Antonio Mazzeo	Italy	Teacher; journalist		

The mission is supported by a coalition of NGOs, trade unions, and advocacy groups, and has received endorsements from prominent international figures and organizations.

== Alleged sabotage and early voyage ==
On 20 July 2025, the day of the vessel's departure from Gallipoli, the crew denounced what they described as two possible acts of "sabotage" which had occurred before they set sail: one was a rope that had been tied to the propeller; the other was the contents of a truck that was meant to transport freshwater for the boat's kitchen but was labeled "sulfuric acid", with two members sustaining burns upon coming into contact with the substance.

The Handala departed from the Italian harbour of Gallipoli at 11:43 on 20 July 2025. On 23 July, the 'Handala tracker' on the FFC's official website showed the boat proceeding east, off the south coast of Crete.

On the evening of 24 July, the FFC announced that all communications with the Handala had been jammed, and that drones had been noticed nearby; contact was reestablished about two hours later.

== Israeli interception, boarding, and detention of passengers ==
On 26 July 2025, after breaking past the point where the Madleen had been intercepted, the Handala crew reported that an Israeli IAI Heron drone was circling the boat. Yedioth Ahronoth reported that Israel intended to send the Shayetet 13 naval commando to seize the ship unless it changed course; at 20:46, the crew, believing two approaching unidentified vessels to be from the Israeli Navy, therefore decided to deviate parallel to Egyptian territorial waters, planning to request entry from the Egyptian Coast Guard in case of emergency. They asked permission to enter Al-Arish as Israeli vessels approached, but were boarded by Israel shortly after in international waters. The IDF proceeded to seize the ship, towing it to the Port of Ashdod, and detain the activists, vowing to deport them to their respective countries. Earlier that week, amid Israeli threats to intercept the vessel, the crew had announced they would go on a hunger strike in case of arrest, in solidarity with starved and besieged Palestinians in Gaza, and had requested protection from their respective governments; Australians Tan Safi and Robert Martin additionally cited their country's complicity with Israel, calling for an arms embargo and a stop to "protecting Israel from any accountability."

After being repeatedly denied access by Israeli authorities, the group's legal team, Adalah, was ultimately allowed to meet the activists and provide them with legal assistance and consultation. Gabrielle Cathala, Jacob Berger and Antonio Mazzeo agreed to sign deportation papers and were immediately expelled, while Bob Suberi and Huwaida Arraf, both holding Israeli citizenship, were released upon interrogation. Another twelve activists refused deportation and remained in Israeli custody pending legal hearings. On 27 July, the remaining four had not yet met with the legal team. According to Adalah, Israel, despite intentionally towing the group out of international waters, was accusing them of illegal entry, and had given them no choice other than "voluntary deportation" or being tried before a tribunal.

On 28 July, the two journalists of the crew (Waad All Musa and Mohamed El Bakkali) were set for deportation and were repatriated by the following day. The other sixteen activists remained held in Givon Prison, Ramla, a facility with a recorded history of human rights abuses, where they appeared before court that day. The court upheld their detention until expulsion, with most of them going on a hunger strike. The detainees described mistreatment in the Israeli prison, including physical assaults from the IDF, poor hygienic conditions and lack of ventilation; in particular, Chris Smalls was reportedly choked and kicked in his legs by seven police officers.

On 29 July, Robert Martin and Tan Safi were repatriated via Jordan, while another five activists (Ange Sahuquet, Emma Fourreau, Chloé Fiona Ludden and Justine Kempf and Antonio La Piccirella) had been transferred to the airport awaiting deportation. Adalah reported harsh conditions in Givon prison, including overcrowded rooms infested with bedbugs, denial of hygiene supplies, and lack of access to fresh air, as well as solitary cells for Frank Romano, who appealed the decision to deport him, and 70-year-old Vigdis Bjorvand. On 31 July, the last two activists to be deported, via Jordan, were Smalls and Hatem Aouini; the others were expelled the previous day.

== Reactions ==
The FFC denounced the Israeli aggression as "a grave violation of international law" in defiance of the International Court of Justice (ICJ)'s binding orders on the facilitation of humanitarian access to Gaza. Ann Wright, part of the FFC's steering committee, stressed that Israel had "no legal authority to detain international civilians aboard the Handala," who were operating "under international law in international waters."

The Spanish Ministry of Foreign Affairs summoned the Israeli chargé d'affaires in Madrid, Dan Poraz, to protest the illegal detention of its citizens Sergio Toribio and Santiago González, as had happened the previous month over the Madleen incident. US activist Braedon Peluso said that his country's embassy, had not inquired or visited despite repeated calls from American detainees.

The Belgium-based legal group Hind Rajab Foundation (HRF) filed a criminal case with the war crimes unit of the UK Metropolitan Police over the interception of the Handala, a British-flagged vessel, the confiscation of the aid and the arrest of the passengers. The HRF urged coordination with Interpol, the UN and the International Criminal Court (ICC) in order to prosecute Vice Admiral David Saar Salama (commander-in-chief of the Israeli Navy) and other officials for violating British sovereignty, the UN Convention on the Law of the Sea (UNCLOS) and the Fourth Geneva Convention, as well as challenging the aforementioned binding orders of the ICJ.

== See also ==
- Humanitarian aid during the Gaza war
- Free Gaza Movement sailings of August 2008 and October 2008, December 2008 to February 2009 sailings, June 2009 sailing
- Jewish Boat to Gaza (2010)
- Freedom Flotilla II (2011)
- Welcome to Palestine (activists' flights planned for 2011/2012)
- Freedom Flotilla III (2015)
- Women's Boat to Gaza (2016)
- Global March to Gaza (mid-June 2025 march to enter Gaza from Egypt)
- Global Sumud Flotilla (September 2025)
