= Gaza Freedom Flotilla =

Humanitarian aid convoys to Palestine

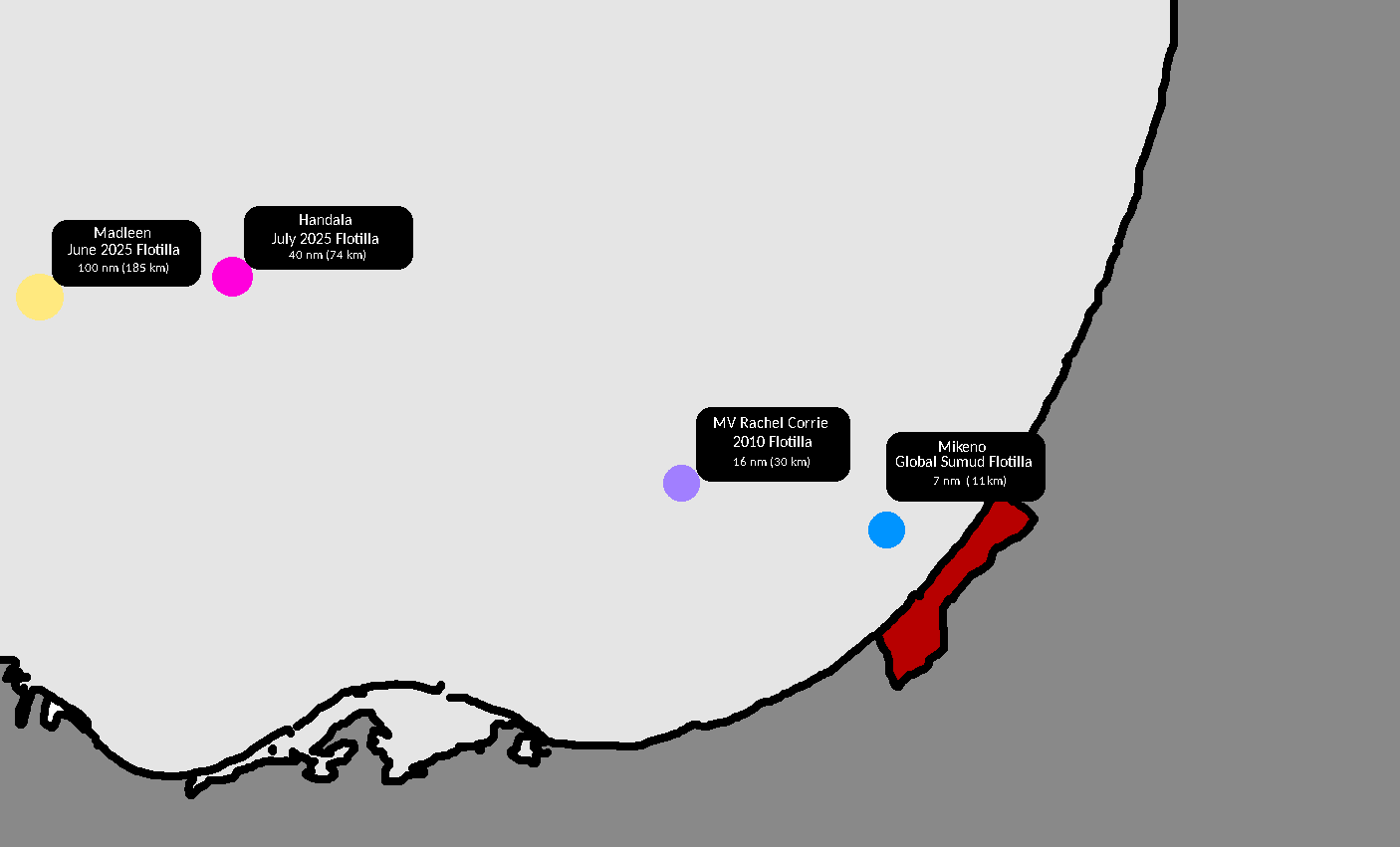
Various locations of the Flotillas between 2010 and 2025 which were intercepted from the Israeli Navy and the IDF. (Position when last signal was sent, not interception, shown for Mikeno.)

Gaza Freedom Flotilla vessels and convoys have attempted to break the blockade of Gaza since 2010, if not sooner, including "The Spirit of Humanity" at the end of June 2009. The first flotilla with six ships was launched by what would then become the Freedom Flotilla Coalition. It was subsequently raided by Israeli forces.

Since 2010, attempts from the Freedom Flotilla II in 2011, Freedom Flotilla III in 2015, Women's Boat to Gaza in 2016, Just Future for Palestine Flotilla in 2018, and flotillas in June and July 2025, have all been intercepted, raided or attacked by Israeli forces.

In August 2025, the Freedom Flotilla Coalition joined the Global Sumud Flotilla, and began launching a series of flotilla convoys towards Gaza.

== Background ==
In 2008, the first ships to breach the Israeli blockade of the Gaza Strip were launched by the Free Gaza Movement. Founded during the 2006 Lebanon War, activists launched 31 boats from 2008 to 2016, with five that succeeded in reaching Gaza.

== Timeline ==
=== 2008 and 2009 ===
In 2008 and 2009, a number of boats attempted to sail to Gaza taking relief supplies and with the additional objective of protesting the Israeli blockade. These included the Free Gaza Movement's Spirit of Humanity, which sailed from Cyprus carrying a number of high-profile passengers including former US congresswomen Cynthia McKinney and Irish Nobel peace prize laureate Mairead Maguire. In relation to the Spirit of Humanity, one report said that the Israeli navy had twice previously intercepted Free Gaza activists sailing into Gaza. The Free Gaza movement described the Spirit of Humanity voyage as their eighth similar trip. They said that five had succeeded but attempts in January and December 2008 had been stopped by the Israeli military.

=== 2010 ===
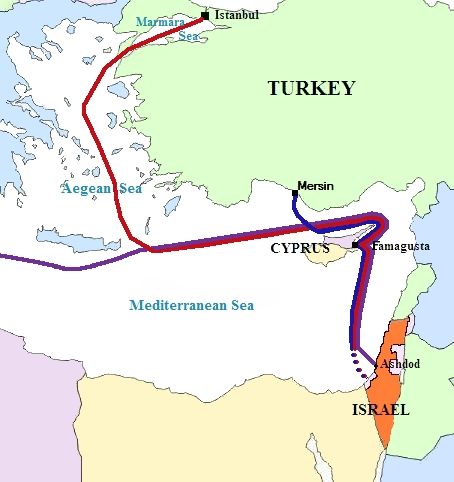
Route of the first Gaza Freedom Flotilla, June 2010

The 2010 Gaza Freedom Flotilla was a small fleet of ships by the Free Gaza Movement and the Turkish Foundation for Human Rights and Freedoms and Humanitarian Relief (İHH). The Flotilla mission to Gaza had the explicit goal of carrying humanitarian aid and construction materials with the intention of breaking the Israeli blockade of the Gaza Strip. In typical circumstances, aid is first brought to Israel to be inspected and then transferred to Gaza.

On 31 May 2010, Israeli forces boarded the ships in a raid from speedboats and helicopters. Following resistance on one of the boats, nine activists were killed by Israeli forces. Widespread international condemnation of and reaction to the raid followed, Israel–Turkey relations were strained, and Israel subsequently eased its blockade on the Gaza Strip.

==== Raid ====
Routes of the Gaza-bound flotilla (green) and the Israeli Navy (orange)

Six civilian ships of the Gaza Freedom Flotilla were raided by Israel on 31 May 2010 in international waters in the Mediterranean Sea. Nine of the flotilla passengers were killed during the raid, with 30 wounded (including one who later died of his wounds). Ten Israeli soldiers were wounded, one seriously. The exact sequence of events is contested, in part due to the IDF's confiscation of the passengers' photographic evidence. The flotilla, organized by the Free Gaza Movement and the Turkish Foundation for Human Rights and Freedoms and Humanitarian Relief (İHH), was carrying humanitarian aid and construction materials, intending to break the Israeli naval blockade of the Gaza Strip.

The Israeli Navy warned the flotilla via radio to stop approaching the naval blockade and to change course to the port of Ashdod. This request was denied and on 31 May 2010, Israeli Shayetet 13 naval commandos boarded the ships in international waters from speedboats and helicopters. Aboard the Turkish ship MV Mavi Marmara, the Israeli Navy faced resistance from about 40 of the 590 passengers, including IHH activists who were said to be armed with iron bars and knives. During the struggle, nine activists were killed, including eight Turkish nationals and one Turkish American, and many were wounded. On 23 May 2014, a tenth member of the flotilla died in hospital after being in a coma for four years. Ten of the commandos were also wounded, one of them seriously.

According to a United Nations Human Rights Council report, all activist deaths were caused by gunshots, and "the circumstances of the killing of at least six of the passengers were in a manner consistent with an extra-legal, arbitrary and summary execution." The five other ships in the flotilla employed passive resistance, which was suppressed without major incident. According to the UNHRC report, several of the passengers were injured and the leg of one was fractured. The ships were towed to Israel. Some passengers were deported immediately, while about 600 were detained after they refused to sign deportation orders; a few of them were slated for prosecution. After international criticism, all of the detained activists were also deported. The raid drew widespread condemnation internationally, resulted in a deterioration of Israel–Turkey relations, and Israel subsequently eased its blockade on the Gaza Strip.

There were several probes into the incident. A UNHRC report in September 2010 deemed the raid illegal and stated that Israel's actions were "disproportionate" and "betrayed an unacceptable level of brutality", with evidence of "wilful killing". United Nations Secretary-General Ban Ki-moon announced a parallel probe in August 2010 by a four-member panel headed by Geoffrey Palmer. The Palmer report was published in September 2011 and also concluded that the raid was illegal. The report stated that the degree of force used against the Mavi Marmara was "excessive and unreasonable", and that the way Israel treated detained crew members violated international human rights law. In response to the raid, Israel offered Turkey $20 million in compensation, which was discussed in March 2013, with an agreement finalized in June 2016.

=== 2011 ===
"Freedom Flotilla II – Stay Human" was a flotilla that planned to break the maritime blockade of the Gaza Strip by Israel by sailing to Gaza on 5 July 2011. Ultimately, the sailing did not take place.

The flotilla was organized by a coalition of 22 NGOs. Its name refers to the May 2010 sailing of the Gaza Freedom Flotilla, which had been raided by Israeli forces, killing a number of activists. Their stated goal was to end the blockade of Gaza "completely and permanently". Initially, 10 ships, with 1,000 activists were set to sail for Gaza, but by 28 June 2011, the number of expected participants had decreased to fewer than 300, plus a few dozen journalists, and by 7 July all but a few dozen activists had returned home.

The flotilla was publicly opposed by the United States, France, the United Kingdom, Turkey, Canada, the Middle East Quartet (consisting of the EU, Russia, the United Nations, and the United States), and United Nations Secretary General Ban Ki-moon. It was publicly supported by Hamas.

Activists on two ships, one in Greece and one in Turkey, found similar damage to their propeller shafts, and claimed that the ships had been sabotaged by Israel. It was reported that the investigation by Turkish authorities on one of the ships determined that there may have been no sabotage at all, and that any damage happened before the boat arrived in Turkey, but these media reports appeared prior to the formal investigation beginning and the Turkish coastguard enquiry has yet to announce its findings. The media reports were disputed by Irish Ship to Gaza, the owner of the vessel. Greece forbade the vessels from leaving its ports, citing safety concerns, but offered to instead send any humanitarian aid to Gaza in its own vessels, under United Nations supervision. Greece's offer was supported by Israel, the Palestinian Authority, and the United Nations, but rejected by the flotilla activists. Subsequently, two flotilla ships, the Audacity of Hope and Tahrir, disobeyed Greece's orders. They were intercepted by the Greek coast guard, brought back to shore, and a few activists were arrested. Activists responded by occupying the Spanish embassy in Athens.

Only the French ship Dignité Al Karama managed to approach Gaza. They advised the Greek authorities that their destination was the Egyptian port of Alexandria, and then turned toward Gaza. On 19 July, the ship was intercepted and boarded without incident by Israeli commandos and escorted to the Israeli port of Ashdod.

=== 2015 ===
Freedom Flotilla III (#FF3) was a flotilla that planned to break the blockade of the Gaza Strip by Israel by sailing to Gaza. It started from Sweden on 10 May 2015 and stopped in several European cities along the way to Gaza. It started officially from Athens, Greece on 25 June 2015. Few details were released in advance.

On 29 June 2015 the Swedish-flagged vessel "Marianne" was intercepted by the Israeli navy in international waters about 100 nautical miles from the Palestinian coast of Gaza. The Israeli military reported that no force was needed during the operation. However, eye-witness video published by Israeli Channel 2 TV shows people being tasered by IDF commandos. The Marianne was boarded by Israeli forces and taken to the port of Ashdod, while the rest of the ships turned back.

Organizers of the flotilla have repeatedly stated the boat was carrying humanitarian aid for Gaza. According to Israel's defense minister Moshe Yaalon "there was no aid on board". The activists supplied a picture with two boxes containing a single solar panel and a nebulizer and added that the boat was to be donated to Gazan fishermen.

On 30 June 2015, Israel began releasing some detainees. Former Tunisian President Moncef Marzouki was deported to Paris, France, while Member of European Parliament Ana Miranda from Galicia was deported to Spain. Arab Member of the Israeli Knesset Basel Ghattas, and Israeli journalist Ohad Chamo, were released. Two Canadians and a Norwegian sailor were deported on July 2. A Russian journalist and six Swedish participants remained in prison until July 6.

=== 2016 ===
The Women's Boat to Gaza (WBG) was an initiative by the Freedom Flotilla Coalition in 2016 to challenge the Israeli naval blockade of the Gaza Strip. The WBG consisted of an entirely female crew and one ship, Zaytouna-Oliva. It started from Barcelona on 14 September 2016 and visited Ajaccio, Corsica and Messina, Sicily along the way. On 5 October 2016, the Israeli Navy intercepted the Women's Boat to Gaza some 14 miles outside the 20-mile "Security Zone" off the Palestinian coast, and detained its crew members, who were taken to the Israeli port of Ashdod. The activists were subsequently deported to their home countries.

=== 2018 ===
The Just Future for Palestine Flotilla, JFP Flotilla or 2018 Gaza Freedom Flotilla was another attempt to challenge the Israeli blockade of the Gaza Strip. The flotilla consisted of two ships Al Awda (The Return) and Freedom and two yachts Mairead and Falestine. On 29 July and 3 August 2018, both Al Awda and Freedom were seized by the Israeli Navy. The activists were arrested and some reported they were tasered, and beaten. Most were deported to their home countries.

=== 2024 ===
The 2024 Gaza Freedom Flotilla was an international humanitarian relief effort organized by the Freedom Flotilla Coalition.

Its departure was extensively delayed by diplomatic processes which resulted in withdrawal of flags of registration from the member ships of the flotilla, and pressure being put on Turkey to prevent their sailing.

Later in the year, the Anadolu was allowed to sail to Egypt to unload, but the cargo was prevented from reaching Gaza.

=== 2025 ===
==== May ====
In the early morning on 2 May 2025, a vessel organized by the Freedom Flotilla Coalition, carrying 16 to 30 (Note: The exact number of people aboard the Conscience during the Gaza Freedom Flotilla incident on 2 May 2025, is disputed. The Freedom Flotilla Coalition, which organized the voyage, stated there were 30 people on board, mostly human rights activists and humanitarian workers. The Maltese government and several news agencies reported 16 people on board: 12 crew members and 4 civilian passengers.) human rights activists and humanitarian aid destined for the Gaza Strip, was attacked by drones in international waters off the coast of Malta. The incident occurred approximately 14–17 nautical miles (26–31 km) from Malta, outside its territorial waters. There is no independent confirmation of the nature of the incident, although Cyprus responded by dispatching a rescue boat, and the Armed Forces of Malta (AFM) sent a patrol boat to assist with extinguishing the fire.

Maltese authorities offered assistance, but insisted on inspecting the vessel first. The captain declined the offer.

==== June ====
The June 2025 Gaza Freedom Flotilla was an aid vessel organized by the Freedom Flotilla Coalition (FFC) with the intention of breaking the Israeli blockade of the Gaza Strip and delivering aid in response to the famine and humanitarian crisis in Gaza. The vessel, Madleen, departed from Catania, Sicily, on 1 June 2025 and contained baby formula, 100 kg (220 lb) of flour, 250 kg (550 lb) of rice, diapers, medical kits, and crutches. In the early hours of 9 June, Israeli forces intercepted, attacked with a chemical spray, boarded, and seized the Madleen in international waters, (Note: In this article, as well as in most of the sources referenced in this article, the term "international waters" is intended to mean 'non-territorial waters'. The waters where the incident took place are part of an exclusive economic zone which allows the country that owns the zone to exploit the resources within the waters, but no country may prohibit free passage upon those waters.) preventing it from reaching the Gaza Strip, and transported the twelve people on board to detention in Israel. The people on board included Swedish activist Greta Thunberg and French MEP Rima Hassan. The detained crew members were later deported from Israel.

==== July ====
The July 2025 Gaza Freedom Flotilla was a civilian maritime mission organized by the Freedom Flotilla Coalition (FFC) to challenge the Israeli naval blockade of Gaza and deliver humanitarian aid. The ship Handala departed from Syracuse, Italy, on 13 July 2025, carrying a diverse group of activists, medics, lawyers, journalists, and humanitarian supplies. It made a stop in Gallipoli between 15 and 20 July, before heading to Gaza. Its entry in the Gaza territorial waters, initially estimated between 27 and 28 July, was expected for the early hours of 27 July. Israel boarded and seized the ship in international waters in the late hours of 26 July, before it could reach its destination, and arrested the members of the crew.

==== August–early October ====
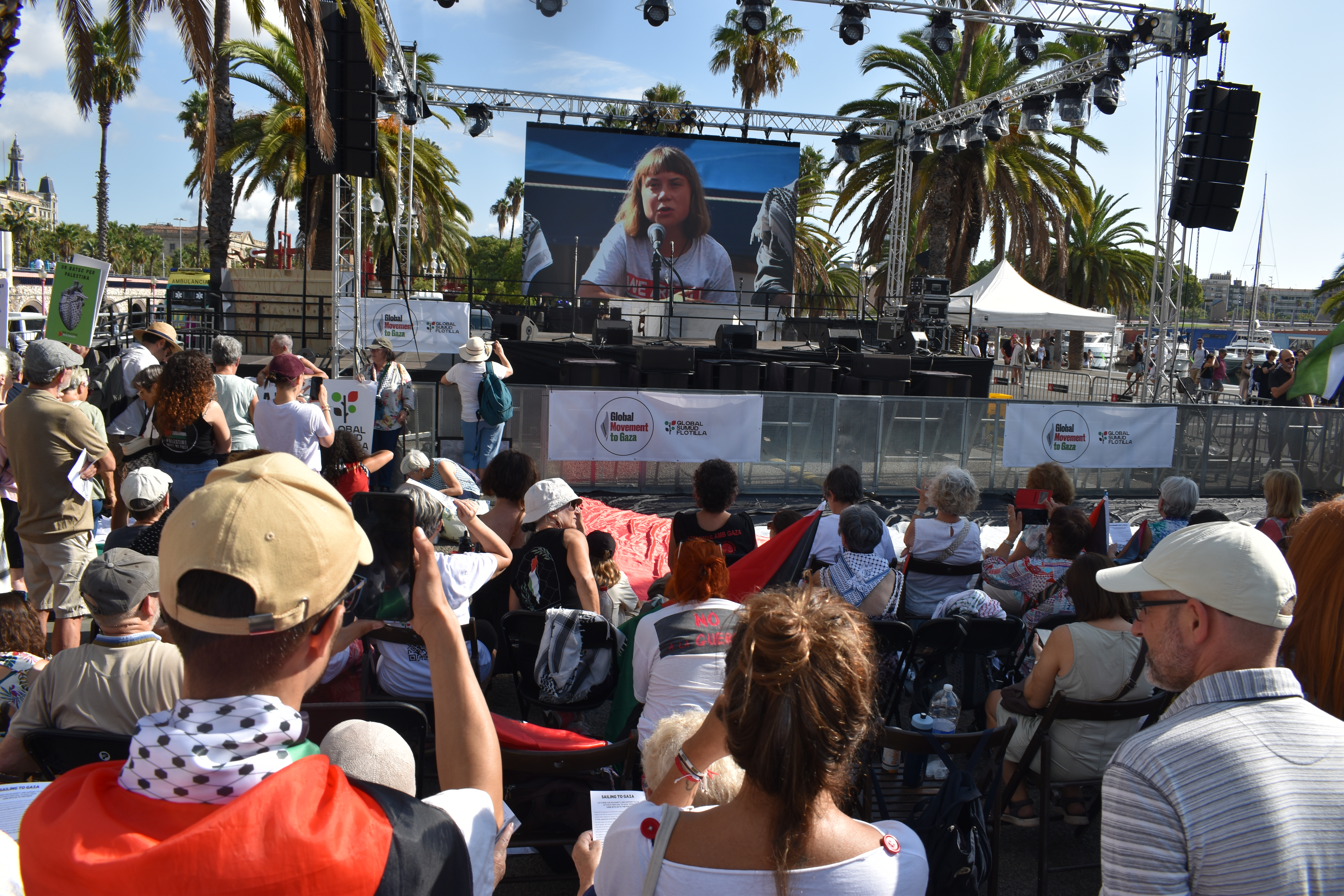
Greta Thunberg addressing supporters ahead of the departure of the Barcelona convoy

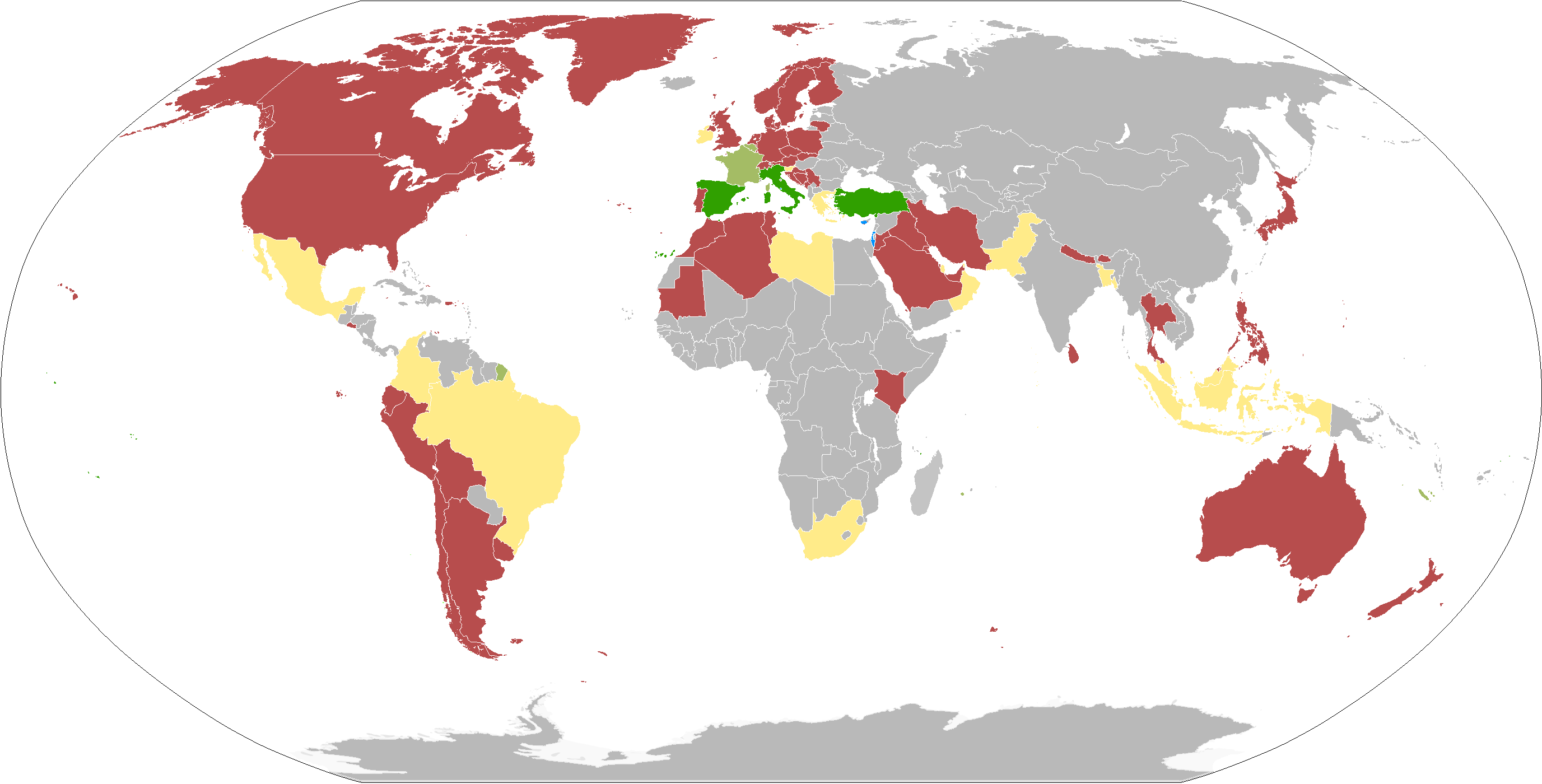
Nations that directly assisted the flotilla to guarantee the safety of their citizens Nations that relied on the direct actions of other nations or entities as to guarantee their citizens' safety on the Flotilla Nations that officially stated there would be some protection, or in case of significant attacks on their citizens, accountability Nations that offered no safety guarantees for their citizens on board Nations that offered an alternative port to Gaza (within and outside their border) in exchange of security guarantees Nations that have none of their citizens on board

The Global Sumud Flotilla (GSF; Arabic: أسطول الصمود العالمي, romanized: Usṭūl aṣ-Ṣumūd al-ʿĀlamī), sometimes referred to as the Global Freedom Flotilla (أسطول الحرية العالمي, Usṭūl al-Ḥurriyya al-ʿĀlamī), was an international, civil society-led maritime initiative launched in mid-2025, which attempted to break the Israeli blockade of the Gaza Strip but was thwarted in an intercept by Israeli naval forces. It is named after ṣumūd, Arabic for 'steadfastness' or 'resilience'. The initiative emerged in July 2025, organised by coalition of Freedom Flotilla Coalition (FFC), Global Movement to Gaza, Maghreb Sumud Flotilla and Sumud Nusantara, during the Gaza war. The flotilla comprised over 40 vessels with 500 participants from more than 44 countries, making it the largest civilian-led convoy of its kind in history. Some attempts to break the Israeli blockade were successful before 2010, but since then ships have been intercepted or attacked by Israeli forces, including an attack by drones in May 2025 and interceptions in international waters in June and July 2025. By early 3 October, Israel had intercepted all vessels of the flotilla, after drone attacks had been reported, and naval vessels dispatched to provide assistance. The flotilla was the first unauthorized naval humanitarian mission to come within 70 nautical miles (130 km) of the Gaza coast since the imposition of the blockade in 2009.

The flotilla began to set sail late August 2025 with delegations and convoys departing Otranto, Genoa and Barcelona, followed by Catania, Syros and Tunis early September. On 3 September, the Italian convoy reached Sicily and Tunisian vessels began converging on Tunis. Four days later, part of the Spanish convoy arrived in northern Tunisia, where in the early hours of 9 September, a fire broke out on one of the main vessels, suspected to be a drone attack. A second incendiary attack was reported the following night on another vessel. On 19 September, the Spanish and Tunisian convoys, having merged in Sicily, departed heading towards Greece. On 22 September, the Greek convoy then departed from Milos heading towards Crete, arriving the following day. On the night of 24 September, eleven vessels were attacked by drones. On 28 September, with the convoys merged in Crete, the flotilla departed to continue its journey towards Gaza. Between 1 and 2 October, the Israeli Navy intercepted the ships, detaining hundreds of people. In the evening of the interception, spontaneous protest took place across various locations in Europe in response. Three days later, 42 detainees began a hunger strike in protest, and by 6 October, over a hundred activists had been deported from Israel. Participants reported mistreatment during detention, that was dismissed by the Israeli foreign ministry, and the interception was condemned by several political figures. On 8 October, a subsequent flotilla consisting of 9 ships, organised by FFC and Thousand Madleens to Gaza, was intercepted with participants detained about 120 nautical miles from Gaza.

The initiative received support from over a dozen foreign ministers, Italian politicians and political parties, MPs in Spain and Portugal, the President of Colombia Gustavo Petro, and the UN Special Rapporteur on the occupied Palestinian territories, Francesca Albanese. In contrast, Israeli minister of national security Itamar Ben-Gvir stated that participants should be imprisoned as terrorists and the Israeli foreign ministry vowed to stop the flotilla. In response to attacks on the flotilla, the Italian ministry of defense sent Italian Navy ships to assist the flotilla and Spanish Prime Minister Pedro Sánchez dispatched a Spanish Navy vessel in case of a rescue operation. With the navy vessels retreating as the flotilla reached closer to Gaza, the Ministry of National Defense of Turkey confirmed it would continue to ensure the safety of the flotilla if required. The European Commission stated that it does not support aid flotillas to Gaza.

==== Late September–October ====
A new flotilla of 9 ships, organised by the Freedom Flotilla Coalition and Thousand Madleens to Gaza, sailed towards Gaza during late September/early October 2025. The flotilla included about 150 participants altogether. One of the ships was the 68-metre-long Conscience, which was hit by drones in May 2025 near Malta while en route to Gaza carrying aid.

Conscience left the port of Otranto on 30 September or 1 October, carrying about a hundred activists, including doctors, nurses, other health workers, journalists, lawyers, Turkish members of parliament, and a Buddhist monk. On 3 October, the nine ship flotilla was near the coast of Crete. On 7 October, Italian MP Marco Croatti, member of the Five Star Movement (MV5S) and participant of the Global Sumud Flotilla asked the Italian government to protect the Italian participants of the initiative.

Vessels
Boat	MMSI
Abd Elkarim Eid	
Alaa Al-Najjar	
Anas Al Sharif	
Conscience	550071155
Gaza Sunbird	
Leïla Khaled	
Milad	
Soul of My Soul	
Umm Saad	

On 8 October 2025, the Israeli military attacked, intercepted and boarded all nine boats about 120 nautical miles from Gaza, in international waters, and detained the passengers. The boarding of one of the boats was live-streamed, showing the moment when a soldier damaged a camera by hitting it with a machine gun. This was the second interception of its kind within one week.

Response to the interception

- Italy: on Wednesday 8 October there have been protests in the cities of Naples, Bologna, Rome, Milan (At least 8,000 protesters), Turin, Salerno and other cities.
- France: demonstrators rallied in Paris on Wednesday to demand the release of the activists detained by Israel.

=== 2026 ===
==== Planning ====
In December 2025, the Global Sumud Flotilla announced their interest in organizing a new flotilla that would take place in the spring of 2026, this time with the aim to include at least 100 ships and 3,000 participants (1,000 of which to be medics that would later stay in the Gaza Strip) from 70 countries..

It was later announced that the first convoy was scheduled to depart from Barcelona on 29 March 2026 (with departures from Tunisia and Italy also confirmed).

==== April ====
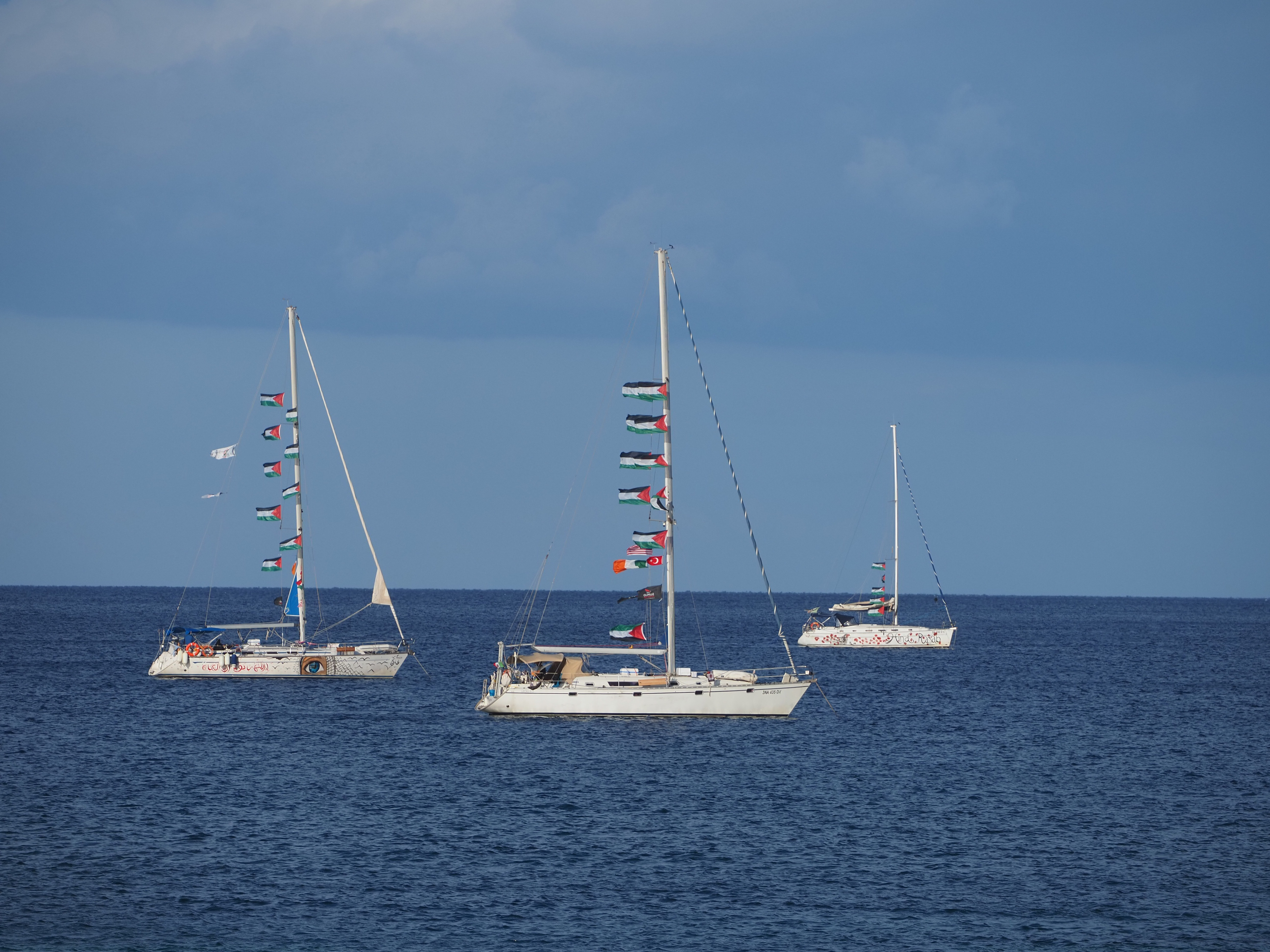
Boats of the flotilla in Ierapetra after its interception

During April, boats set out from Marseille and Naples, to join others from Barcelona and form a flotilla of 58 boats carrying humanitarian aid and aiming to break the blockade.

In the early hours of April 30, the IDF intercepted 22 boats of the convoy off Crete. 181 people were detained, including Pablo Giachello, an Argentine provincial deputy. The IDF stated it would transfer the activists to Greece; however two activists, Saif Abu Keshek and Thiago Avila, were taken to Israel, where they were detained for an additional 10 days. Allegations subsequently emerged regarding the mistreatment of Saif Abu Keshek and Thiago Avila.

==== May ====
Following this first interception, the remaining boats regrouped in Turkey, and 54 vessels sailed again for Gaza, this time from Marmaris, on 14 May. On 18 May, Israeli forces boarded vessels of the flotilla off Cyprus, some 250 nautical miles from Gaza. 430 participants were detained at Ashdod port.

===== Responses to the interceptions =====
After the first interception (off Crete) and with Spanish national Saif Abu Keshek detained in Israel, the Spanish Ministry of Foreign Affairs summoned the chargé d'affaires of the Israeli embassy in Madrid and strongly condemned the operation. Official sources indicated that around 30 Spanish nationals were among those detained, and the Spanish government stated that consular protection mechanisms had been activated.

Several governments and human rights organizations described the interception as violating international law. However, Israeli officials stated that the flotilla was attempting to break the maritime blockade of Gaza and was therefore operating illegally under Israeli interpretation of the blockade.

In May 2026, after Israeli forces intercepted the Global Sumud Flotilla off Cyprus, Itamar Ben-Gvir released videos showing him taunting detained activists. The footage showed activists kneeling with their hands tied behind their backs, while Ben-Gvir called for them to be imprisoned for a long period. The foreign ministries of several countries, including France, Canada, the Netherlands, Portugal, Spain, Italy, South Korea, Sweden, Switzerland, Greece, Germany, Poland, Qatar, Slovenia, Turkey, Austria, Belgium, Colombia, the United Kingdom and New Zealand condemned the treatment of the detained activists.

Later that month, France banned Ben-Gvir from entering the country, with French Foreign Minister Jean-Noël Barrot citing Ben-Gvir's "reprehensible actions towards French and European citizens" who were passengers on the Global Sumud Flotilla. Poland also imposed a five-year entry ban on Ben-Gvir over his treatment of detained activists. Ireland prohibited Itamar Ben Gvir and finance minister Bezalel Smotrich from entering the country, citing behavior against 2026 Global Sumud Flotilla activists and anti-Palestinian statements.

On 21 May, Israel deported all 420 activists to Istanbul, Turkey. Following their release, multiple activists alleged they were subjected to systematic physical, psychological, and sexual abuse while in Israeli custody. Human rights organization Adalah and flotilla organizers documented at least 15 cases of sexual violence, detailing incidents of forced strip searches, sexual taunting, groping, and multiple accounts of rape, including forcible penetration with a handgun. Activists from approximately 40 countries reported that the most severe abuse occurred inside darkened shipping containers on an Israeli landing craft converted into a makeshift prison ship, where they were denied water and blankets. Volunteers detailed being beaten, repeatedly tasered, and subjected to sleep deprivation and prolonged stress positions, resulting in severe injuries such as broken bones and fractured vertebrae.

Israeli authorities denied the claims, with the Israel Prison Service and the IDF stating that all detainees were treated legally and respectfully, while dismissing the flotilla as a propaganda stunt for Hamas. The allegations provoked widespread international condemnation, which was exacerbated when Israeli National Security Minister Itamar Ben-Gvir posted a video of himself taunting bound, kneeling detainees, prompting a rare public reprimand from Prime Minister Benjamin Netanyahu. The United Nations expressed deep concern, and several nations launched legal or diplomatic responses. France instituted an entry ban on Ben-Gvir and referred the abuse of French nationals to its public prosecutor, while Italy, Spain, and Turkey initiated criminal investigations into kidnapping, torture, and sexual assault. Canada and Germany condemned the mistreatment of their nationals, with German officials demanding a full explanation for the serious accusations. The United States joined in the criticism, with US Ambassador to Israel Mike Huckabee stating that Ben-Gvir had "betrayed the dignity" of his nation. Malaysia announced plans to initiate formal proceedings against Israel at the International Court of Justice over the abduction and alleged torture of its citizens.

On 21 August, Turkey's Minister of Justice, Akın Gürlek, announced that the country was seeking Interpol for an international arrest warrant for Israeli Prime Minister Benjamin Netanyahu for the interception of flotilla activists and accusing him of genocide. The ministry also sought the arrest of an IDF soldier named Afek Moskovitch. According to İhlas News Agency, Moskovitch was accused of destroying buildings at the Islamic University of Gaza, including a hospital and medical facility. The ministry also stated that both of them are being prosecuted for "crimes against humanity, genocide, aggravated deprivation of liberty, 'intentional assault and battery,' torture, destruction of property, aggravated looting, and hijacking of transport vehicles."

== See also ==
- Gaza journey of MV Rachel Corrie
- Ship to Gaza (Sweden), Swedish organization co-founder of the Freedom Flotilla Coalition
- Jewish Boat to Gaza (2010)
- Road to Hope (2010)

== Sources ==
- Carabott, Sarah (2 May 2025). "Gaza aid vessel 'attacked by drones' just outside Malta waters". Times of Malta.
- Goillandeau, Martin; Symons, Todd; Salman, Abeer; Magramo, Kathleen (2 May 2025). "Gaza Freedom Flotilla says ship has issued SOS, after alleged drone attack off the coast of Malta". CNN.
- Palmer, Geoffrey; Uribe, Alvaro; Itzhar, Joseph Ciechanover; Sanberk, Süleyman Özdem (2 September 2011). "Report of the Secretary-General's Panel of Inquiry on the 31 May 2010 Flotilla Incident" (PDF). United Nations.
- Uras, Umut; Jamal, Urooba (2 May 2025). "'Strangulation': Israel kills 31 in Gaza as aid blockade starves children". Al Jazeera.
