= 2024 Gaza Freedom Flotilla =

Attempt to break the Israeli blockade of the Gaza Strip

The 2024 Gaza Freedom Flotilla was an international humanitarian relief effort organized by the Freedom Flotilla Coalition.

== Handala: For the Children of Gaza ==
During 2024, the Freedom Flotilla Coalition's ship Handala continued sailings (begun in 2023) around Northern Europe in a publicity and awareness mission titled 'Handala: For the Children of Gaza'.

== Break the Siege ==
In April 2024 the mission 'Break the Siege' had a goal of delivering 5,500 Tonnes of aid to the Gaza Strip by sea from Turkey during the Gaza war and Gaza Strip famine. Three ships were to be involved:

- Anadolu (formerly Dalya H), (IMO: 9139127) -a general cargo ship built in 1997 and sailing under the flag of Guinea-Bissau, with a capacity of 5,500 tons
- Conscience (formerly The Majestic), (IMO: 7211440), a passenger ship built in 1972 and operating under the flag of Palau
- Akdeniz (formerly The Prince) (IMO: 7615048), a Ro-Ro/passenger ship operating under the flag of Guinea-Bissau

Among others, activists from the United States traveled to Turkey with plans to join the flotilla.

According to its organizers, the Freedom Flotilla Coalition included the İHH Humanitarian Relief Foundation, a conservative Turkish government-connected NGO, with which many participants were affiliated. Some Israeli media have reported that the flotilla is overseen by İHH. Fehmi Bülent Yıldırım, the president of İHH, stated in a press briefing that the convoy, with ships from Turkey, Lebanon, and Libya, planned to initially dock at the Egyptian city of Arish before heading to Rafah. Ynet reported that the initiative received the green light from Turkish authorities, with Turkey's intelligence chief involved in its arrangement.

The departure of the flotilla was repeatedly delayed; it had been scheduled to leave on 26 April. Organizers said that the flotilla could not depart that day because Israel was pressuring Guinea-Bissau to withdraw the flag from one of the ships in the flotilla, and also stated that the United States, United Kingdom, and Germany were trying to pressure Turkey into not allowing the ship to depart.

Later in the year, the Anadolu was allowed to sail to Egypt to unload, but the cargo was prevented from reaching Gaza.

== See also ==
- 2010 Gaza flotilla raid
- Freedom Flotilla II (2011)
- Freedom Flotilla III (2015)
- Women's Boat to Gaza (2016)
- May 2025 drone attack on Gaza Freedom Flotilla
- June 2025 Gaza Freedom Flotilla
- July 2025 Gaza Freedom Flotilla
