= Freedom Flotilla III =

2015 attempt to break the Israeli blockade of the Gaza Strip

Freedom Flotilla III (#FF3) was a flotilla that planned to break the blockade of the Gaza Strip by Israel by sailing to Gaza. It started from Sweden on 10 May 2015 and stopped in several European cities along the way to Gaza. It started officially from Athens, Greece on 25 June 2015. Few details were released in advance.

On 29 June 2015 the Swedish-flagged vessel "Marianne" was intercepted by the Israeli navy in international waters about 100 nautical miles from the Palestinian coast of Gaza. The Israeli military reported that no force was needed during the operation. However, eye-witness video published by Israeli Channel 2 TV shows people being tasered by IDF commandos. The Marianne was boarded by Israeli forces and taken to the port of Ashdod, while the rest of the ships turned back.

Organizers of the flotilla have repeatedly stated the boat was carrying humanitarian aid for Gaza. According to Israel's defense minister Moshe Yaalon "there was no aid on board". The activists supplied a picture with two boxes containing a single solar panel and a nebulizer and added that the boat was to be donated to Gazan fishermen.

On 30 June 2015, Israel began releasing some detainees. Former Tunisian President Moncef Marzouki was deported to Paris, France, while Member of European Parliament Ana Miranda from Galicia was deported to Spain. Arab Member of the Israeli Knesset Basel Ghattas, and Israeli journalist Ohad Chamo, were released. Two Canadians and a Norwegian sailor were deported on July 2. A Russian journalist and six Swedish participants remained in prison until July 6.

== Reactions to the Flotilla ==
=== Official ===
- Israel's stated plan was to "welcome" the flotilla participants and hand them letters with a message from the Prime Minister's Office: "Perhaps you meant to sail somewhere else nearby – Syria, where Assad's regime is massacring his people every day, with the support of the murderous Iranian regime."
- (United Nations) UN-ESCWA: The UN Undersecretary-General and Executive Secretary of UN-ESCWA Rima Khalaf issued a statement condemning Israel's detention of former Tunisian president Moncef Marzouki. Khalaf concluded "What president Marzouki and his companions did is a practice of a right and a response to the call of conscience to lift the injustice and suffering of 1.8 million civilians under siege in Gaza. What Israel did is aggression and offence".
- ISESCO: ISESCO condemned seizure of Freedom Flotilla Gaza 3 vessel carrying humanitarian supplies to the people of Gaza Strip. It called on the international community to put pressure on the Zionist regime to promptly release all people on board and guarantee their safety including Moncef Marzouki.
- Tunisia: Tunisia condemned the interception by the Israel Defense Forces of one of the vessels of the Freedom III flotilla and the President Moncef Marzouki. Tunisia called on Israel, in a Foreign Ministry statement, to immediately release all participants in the flotilla, holding the Israeli occupation responsible for their safety and that of President Moncef Marzouki.
- Qatar: The State of Qatar strongly condemned the Israel Defense Forces' interception of Freedom Flotilla III heading to Gaza and the detention of former Tunisian President Moncef Marzouki. The Foreign Ministry said in a statement that the officials are following with concern the development of the situation in the Gaza Strip, the continuation of the Israeli violations and cutting off humanitarian supplies for Gaza's population, calling for quickly release of Marzouki and the rest of the participants. The statement called on the international community to take immediate action to stop the Israeli abuse and lift the siege on the Gaza Strip.
- Sweden: The Swedish Ministry of Foreign Affairs has condemned Israel for its intervention on the Swedish leader vessel, Marianne, in international waters during its participation in the Third Freedom Flotilla to Gaza. The statement asked Israel to lift the blockade in Gaza immediately.

=== Unofficial ===
- Vice Chairman of Hamas political bureau Ismail Haniyeh condemned the Israeli piracy against Freedom Flotilla 3. Haniya stated that such piracy highlights the Israeli policy of violation of the International law, and reflects the Israeli terrorism that prevents freedom of sailing to and from the Strip. Haniya slammed the Israeli interception of prominent figures participating in Freedom Flotilla 3, including the former Tunisian President Moncef Marzouki, stressing that such Israeli act breaches diplomatic and international norms. Haniya praised Marzouki as a defender of the Arab Spring and Arab revolutions that support the Palestinian cause.
- Tunisia's parties, Ennahda Movement, Democratic Forum, Republican Party, Congress for the Republic, Democratic Current and Hizb ut-Tahrir (Tunisia Branch) Issued statements condemning interception fleet, and in solidarity with the Palestinian people and the Gaza Strip, and calls for the international community to intervene to ensure the safety of the participants, led by former President Moncef Marzouki.
- Spain's Podemos and Galician Nationalist Bloc have criticized Israeli action to disrupt the Third Gaza Freedom Flotilla. In a written statement, the Galician Nationalist Bloc described Israeli action as "piracy", and it called on Spain's Foreign Ministry to take a tough stance over the incident and face the Gaza issue head on. Podemos's spokesman also urged the international community to raise its voice against Israel.

== Participants ==
This is not a complete list.

State	Personality	Status
Tunisia	Moncef Marzouki	Former President of Tunisia.
Sweden	Kajsa Ekis Ekman	Journalist, writer and activist.
Spain	Teresa Forcades	Physician and a Benedictine nun.
Iraq	Nisreen El-Hashemite	Physician and researcher, Executive Director of the Royal Academy of Science International Trust.
Canada	Robert Lovelace	Activist and professor at the Department of Global Development Studies at Queen's University.
Canada	Kevin Neish	Activist and a human rights activist in the International Solidarity Movement.
Morocco	Abouzaid El Mokrie El Idrissi	Advocate, thinker and deputy in the House of Representatives.
Spain	Estefanía Torres Martínez	Member of the European Parliament.
Jordan	Yahya Saoud	Deputy in the Parliament of Jordan.
Israel	Basel Ghattas	Arab citizen of Israel and deputy in the Knesset for Balad and the Joint List.
Tunisia	Anouar Gharbi	Advisor of former Tunisian President Marzouki and a founder of the European campaign to break the siege of Gaza.
Australia	Robert Martin	Anti-war activist.
Spain	Pablo Miranzo	Photographer and activist.
Spain	Ana Miranda Paz	Member of the European Parliament.
Algeria	Nasser Hamdadaouch	Deputy in the People's National Assembly.
Norway	Gerd von der Lippe	Sports sociologist and former sprinter, professor, journalist and writer.
Denmark	Özlem Cekic	Former Deputy in the Danish Parliament.
United States	Joe Meadors	Former U.S. Navy signalman, who survived the USS Liberty incident.
United States	Ann Wright	Former United States Army colonel and retired U.S. State Department official.
Sweden	Bertil Gustafsson	Applied mathematician and numerical analyst.
Sweden	Dror Feiler	An Israeli-born Swedish musician, artist and left-wing activist.
Sweden	Maria Svensson	Official spokeswoman of Feminist Initiative.
Sweden	Daniel Sestrajcic	Former Deputy in the Swedish Parliament.
Sweden	Ulf Bjereld	Professor at the University of Gothenburg and head of the Religious Social Democrats of Sweden.
Norway	Åsmund Grøver Aukrust	Deputy member of the Parliament of Norway.
Italy	Claudio Tamaglini	Peace activist with the International Solidarity Movement.
Denmark	Rosa Lund	Member of the Danish Parliament.
Sweden	Åsa Opperdoes	Activist.
Denmark	Trine Pertou Mach	Deputy in the Danish Parliament.
Turkey	Hajar Al-Mutairi	Journalist with the Anadolu Agency.
Turkey	Tayfun Jalci	Journalist with the Anadolu Agency.
Spain	Eduardo Muriel	Journalist with La Marea.
France	Aissa Boukanoun	Journalist with Euronews.
Morocco	Mohammed El Bakkali	Journalist with Al Jazeera.
Norway	Ammar Al Hamdan	Journalist with Al Jazeera.
Algeria	Abdel Lateef Belkaim	Journalist with Echourouk TV.
New Zealand	Jacob Bryant	Journalist with Māori Television.
New Zealand	Ruwani Perera	Journalist with Māori Television.
Russia	Nadya Kevorkova	Journalist.
Sweden	Lennart Berggren	Journalist.
Germany	Martin Lejeune	Journalist.
Israel	Ohad Chamo	Journalist with Channel 2.
Other media: Russia Today, Al-Quds TV

== Ships ==
The following ships participated in the flotilla:

- (Sweden) Marianne
- (Greece) Rachel
- (Greece) Vittorio
- (Greece) Juliano II

== Organization partners ==
- International Committee for Breaking the Siege of Gaza
- The European Campaign to End the Siege on Gaza
- Miles of Smiles
- Freedom Flotilla Coalition
- IHH Humanitarian Relief Foundation
- Greece Ship to Gaza
- Canadian Boat to Gaza
- Gaza's Ark
- Ship to Gaza
- Rumbo a Gaza
- Palestine Solidarity Alliance

== See also ==
- 2010 Gaza Freedom Flotilla
- 2010 Gaza flotilla raid
- Freedom Flotilla II (2011)
- Women's Boat to Gaza (2016)
- 2024 Gaza freedom flotilla
- May 2025 Gaza Freedom Flotilla incident
- June 2025 Gaza Freedom Flotilla
- July 2025 Gaza Freedom Flotilla
- Welcome to Palestine
