= Welcome to Palestine =

2011 & 2012 pro-Palestine activism campaign

Welcome to Palestine, dubbed by Israeli media the flytilla, was an initiative of Palestinian civil society organizations in the West Bank to welcome hundreds of internationals to participate in a series of solidarity activities with the Palestinian people in the territory. According to organizers, the aim was also to draw attention to Israel's border policies and life under Israeli occupation. Israeli officials described those participating as "hooligans" and "provocateurs," and maintained they had a right to deny the activists entry. Both in 2011—the project's inaugural year—and 2012, many participants were not allowed onto flights departing from European airports to Israel as a result of Israeli diplomatic efforts. In 2011, a total of 130 activists who did arrive at airport were refused entry upon landing, and a few were flown back to their countries' of origin immediately. Four people were granted entry after agreeing to sign documents in which they pledged not to participate in disturbances of the order. The rest of those refused entry were kept in two jails, some for several days, until their expulsions could be arranged.

== Welcome to Palestine 2011 ==
Organizers estimated 600 to 1,000 international activists planned to participate, with delegations from France, Great Britain, Sweden, Germany, the USA, Japan and several African countries. Olivia Zemor, a French activist said about half the participants were French and ranged in age from 9 to 85. Sam Bahour, a Palestinian coordinator for the Right to Enter Campaign, said the international activists were invited to participate in the "Welcome to Palestine" initiative by 30 Palestinian civil society organisations.

Upon arrival on 8 July in Ben Gurion Airport in Tel Aviv, the international activists were to openly declare their intent to go to occupied Palestinian territory to Israeli immigration officials. Activists say Israel's prejudicial border policies prompt visitors intending to travel to Palestinian areas to lie about their destination and this initiative aims to draw attention to the right of Palestinians to receive visitors.

Palestinian civil society organisations who make up Welcome to Palestine said they have planned a full itinerary of peaceful activities beginning in Bethlehem and Ramallah on 9 July. According to The New York Times, Palestinian organizers include "well-known advocates of non-violent protest like Sami Awad of the Bethlehem-based Holy Land Trust and Mazin Qumsiyeh, a science professor at Bethlehem University."

=== Israel's response ===
In the days prior to the launch of the initiative, Yitzhak Aharonovitch, Israel's Internal Security minister, said those intending to participate were "hooligans", and Benjamin Netanyahu, the Prime Minister, said "Every country has the right to deny entrance of provocateurs and trouble-makers into its borders." Israeli officials ordered a heightened security presence at the airport. Local media dubbed the initiative a "flightilla", referencing the stymied attempt of the Freedom Flotilla II to break the Gaza blockade, and disseminated reports that the international visitors would attempt to create chaos at the airport. Activists said they were only planning nonviolent activities, and took issue with what they described as a smear campaign launched by Israel against them.

Israel's Interior Ministry sent a letter with a list of 342 passengers it described as "pro-Palestinian radicals" to foreign airlines notifying them that these people would be refused entry. Airlines were asked to prevent these passengers from boarding, and were warned that if they were allowed to fly into Tel Aviv, they would be sent back again on the same aircraft. Several airlines did as Israel requested, among them Lufthansa, Swiss International Air Lines and EasyJet. Jet2.com canceled tickets to Israel, and according to The Guardian, did not provide a refund, to three Manchester women that had intended on participating in the "flytilla" protest. Donzel Jean Claude, spokesman for Swiss Air said that this issue is regulated by the International Civil Aviation Organization and that airlines are "legally obliged" not to board passengers for whom they have information from the destination country that these people will not be allowed to enter. Dr Mark Ellis, executive director of the International Bar Association said that "every country has the right to say who can and who cannot enter its borders. It's a controversial matter, but not illegal".

=== Detainees and deportees ===
By 9 July, Israeli authorities had questioned hundreds of airline passengers who had arrived at Ben Gurion Airport, and detained 124 people. Four were deported, and the rest, some 76 women and 38 men, were taken to prisons in Beersheba (Ela) and Ramleh (Givon) in Israel, where Israeli officials said they would be held until deported. The majority of the detainees are French, but there are also nationals from Belgium, Bulgaria, the Netherlands, Spain, the United Kingdom and the United States. Two Australians, Vivienne Porzsolt of Jews against the Occupation, and former parliamentarian Sylvia Hale, who had been participants on the Canadian Boat to Gaza, the Tahrir, as part of the Freedom Flotilla II, flew from Crete to Tel Aviv and were detained but won a precedent-setting court decision allowing them stay in Israel and apply for permission to travel to Palestine. Among the British detainees who include four Scots, five English and three Welsh, was the coordinator for the British end of the visit who is also a university teacher and chairman of The Scottish Palestine Solidarity Campaign, as well as four retired professionals between the ages of 66 and 83, an Open University research fellow, the deputy leader of the Wales Green Party and a founding member of Swansea Palestine Community Link.

The Jerusalem Post reported on 10 July that group of Belgian men being held in Beersheba issued a statement declaring a hunger strike that French and German detainees at the same facility may also have joined. The demands are to be granted contact with their families, attorneys, and one another, and an international investigation into the process that led to their detainment. As of 11 July, 38 detainees had been deported, leaving 82 still in Israeli custody.

Six Israeli pro-Palestinian activists who came to the airport to demonstrate their support for the initiative were arrested by Israeli authorities, after, according to the Israeli police spokesman, they "caused a disturbance in the terminal".

Welcome to Palestine representatives in Bethlehem said legal action would be taken to challenge Israel's response.

== Responses ==
According to Benyamin Netanyahu, the flytilla activists were barred because they represented a "provocation [that] was conceived by extremist Islamic and anti-Israel organizations who object to peace and call for Israel's destruction." Israel had warned airlines to bar personae non gratae from flying or face footing the bill for deporting them, fines, and denial of their aircraft to use Israeli airspace. Hundreds of people had their flight reservations cancelled by various airlines on 15 April, and an Israeli official said that anyone who managed to evade the Israeli no-fly requests would be apprehended at the Tel Aviv airport and deported. Air France said it would "refuse to embark any passenger not admissible by Israel", citing as justification the Chicago Convention. In a sarcastic letter, the Israeli government proposed alternative objects of protest for the activists to focus on: "Syrian regime's daily savagery against its own people, which has claimed thousands of lives, Iranian regime's brutal crackdown on dissidents and its support for terrorism throughout the world, and Hamas rule in Gaza, where terror organizations commit a double war crime by firing rockets at civilians while hiding behind civilians". Some pro-Israeli activists also flew in to protest the Welcome to Palestine fly-in, which they called an "act of hatred".

Public Security Minister Yitzhak Aharonovitch and his team were thanked by Netanyahu for what he regarded as a successful operation; Aharonovitch in turn expressed his gratitude to the airlines and European governments for their cooperation.

Participants in the project said they wanted to pass through the airport in Tel Aviv without incident in order to go directly to the West Bank, where they wanted to take part in a project on the right to education for Palestinian children.

According to an Israeli official, 40% of names on the Shin Bet fly-in blacklist were not activists, including Israeli citizens, European business people and government officials, with even a French diplomat and his wife having tickets cancelled. The Israeli foreign ministry later confirmed that "mistakes were made".

Israeli newspaper Haaretz said the country had used "extreme-to-hysterical measures to stop the activists from flying in, to the point of threatening the airlines"; Israeli journalist Gideon Levy had lamented before the fly-in that his country never "miss[es] an opportunity to look ridiculous in the eyes of the world." Israel's Channel 10 carried commentary saying the government would have been better off greeting the activists with roses and escorting them to Bethlehem on buses.

In the end, less than thirty out of an estimated 1,500 intended participants reached Bethlehem.

== See also ==
- 2010 Gaza Freedom Flotilla (2010)
- 2010 Gaza flotilla raid
- Freedom Flotilla II (2011)
- Freedom Flotilla III (2015)
- Women's Boat to Gaza (2016)
- 2024 Gaza Freedom Flotilla
- May 2025 Gaza Freedom Flotilla incident
- June 2025 Gaza Freedom Flotilla
- July 2025 Gaza Freedom Flotilla
