= June 2025 Gaza Freedom Flotilla =

Attempt to break the Israeli blockade of the Gaza Strip

The Madleen setting sail on 1 June 2025

The June 2025 Gaza Freedom Flotilla was an aid vessel organized by the Freedom Flotilla Coalition (FFC) with the intention of breaking the Israeli blockade of the Gaza Strip and delivering aid in response to the famine and humanitarian crisis in Gaza. The vessel, Madleen, departed from Catania, Sicily, on 1 June 2025 and contained baby formula, 100 kg (220 lb) of flour, 250 kg (550 lb) of rice, diapers, medical kits, and crutches. In the early hours of 9 June, Israeli forces intercepted, attacked with a chemical spray, boarded, and seized the Madleen in international waters, (Note: In this article, as well as in most of the sources referenced in this article, the term "international waters" is intended to mean 'non-territorial waters'. The waters where the incident took place are part of an exclusive economic zone which allows the country that owns the zone to exploit the resources within the waters, but no country may prohibit free passage upon those waters.) preventing it from reaching the Gaza Strip, and transported the twelve people on board to detention in Israel. The people on board included Swedish activist Greta Thunberg and French MEP Rima Hassan. The detained crew members were later deported from Israel.

== Background ==
The June 2025 Gaza Freedom Flotilla is one of several attempts to break the Israeli blockade and send humanitarian aid to Gaza via ships. The first was seen in 2010, when the Gaza Freedom Flotilla which was funded in part by Turkish NGO Foundation for Human Rights and Freedoms and Humanitarian Relief or IHH, sailed with the intent of breaking the blockade of the Gaza Strip that had been enacted in 2007; ten activists were killed by Israeli commandos on this voyage. The FFC also undertook similar missions in 2011, 2015, 2018 and May 2025 with Israeli officials intercepting all attempts, with participants detained, deported or held in Israeli prisons. The vessel Conscience in the FFC's previous mission attempting to establish a corridor for humanitarian aid had been struck by drones while preparing to set sail for Gaza in May 2025, 14 miles off the coast of Malta, in international waters. Four individuals sustained injuries in the attacks, and the ship suffered damage and flooding.

After the October 7 attacks and during the ensuing Gaza war, Israel intensified its blockade on the Gaza Strip, labeling it as a total blockade denying the entry of food, water, medicine, fuel and electricity, causing high risk of famine and a humanitarian crisis that scholars have described as genocide. Due to Israeli checkpoints into Gaza which predate the October 7 attacks, the Israeli government and Israel Defense Forces (IDF) have controlled the entrance of humanitarian aid into Gaza, with aid delivery disrupted multiple times over the years, either via Israeli government blockades or Israeli civilian protests. Additionally, since March 2, 2025, very little humanitarian aid has been allowed into Gaza, with concerns about famine in Gaza being raised by the Integrated Food Security Phase Classification (IPC). Israel has announced that any action that leads to breaking the siege of Gaza will be met with failure. Israel and the Gaza Humanitarian Foundation allege that Hamas has diverted aid and hindered humanitarian aid disbursement.

== Voyage ==
The vessel Madleen (formerly the Barcarole; the boat was renamed in honor of Gaza's first fisher woman, Madleen Culab) set sail from Catania, Sicily, on 1 June 2025 carrying baby formula, 100 kg of flour, 250 kg of rice, diapers, menstrual products, water desalination kits, medical supplies, crutches, and children's prosthetics and was expected to reach the Gaza Strip on 7 June. Twelve passengers were on board, including activist Greta Thunberg and French Member of European Parliament Rima Hassan. Since it was sailing under a UK Red Ensign, the Freedom Flotilla Coalition said the UK government "has a legal duty to defend 'Madleen' and the civilians on board, and to prevent unlawful interference-including any threat or use of force-by foreign powers such as Israel".

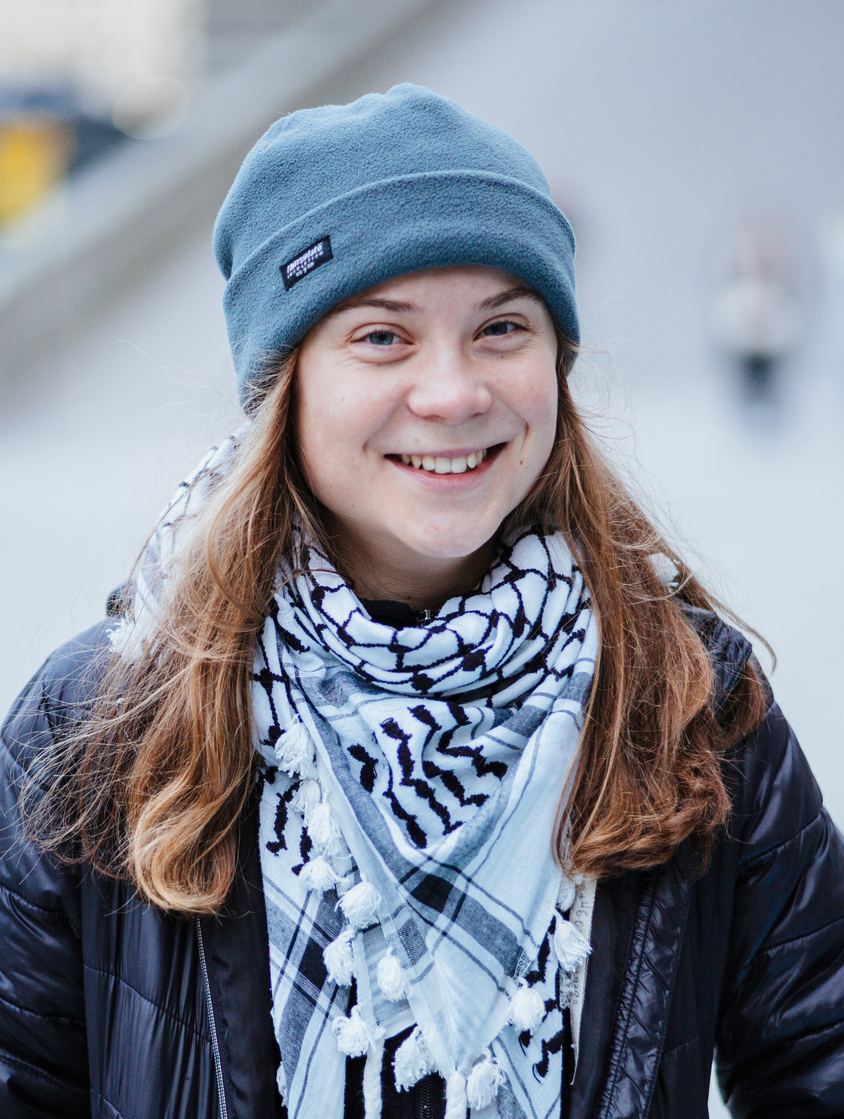
The Swedish climate activist Greta Thunberg was among the high-profile activists present aboard the Madleen.

The passengers (along with their nationalities) included:

- Greta Thunberg
- MEP Rima Hassan
- Yasemin Acar
- Baptiste André
- Thiago Ávila
- Al Jazeera journalist Omar Faiad
- Pascal Maurieras
- Blast journalist Yanis Mhamdi
- Suayb Ordu
- Sergio Toribio
- Marco van Rennes
- Reva Seifert-Viard

Others involved included:

- Vigdis Bjorvand
- Yazan Eissa

On 3 June, a drone was seen near the vessel prompting a call for international protection. A Hellenic Coast Guard Heron drone was reported to have monitored the vessel. In the afternoon of 4 June the vessel had been reported as being near Crete. On 5 June the vessel altered course to assist a small boat of Sudanese migrants. Four migrants were recovered from the sea and taken aboard Madleen, and subsequently transferred to Frontex. On 7 June, the vessel had reached Egypt.

== Israeli interception, boarding, and detention of passengers ==
On 8 June, passengers reported that boats were circling the Madleen and the ship's alarm was triggered. They prepared for an interception, but the boats eventually dispersed, and passengers later described the incident as an "unlikely false alarm". The Freedom Flotilla Coalition (FFC) also reported that two Israeli quadcopter drones surrounded the vessel and sprayed a white, paint-like substance that passengers described as an irritant. Shortly afterward, the FFC reported losing contact with the passengers, and the Israeli military boarded the ship.

At around 3:00 a.m. on 9 June, Israeli Navy forces from Shayetet 13 seized the vessel about 185 kilometres from Gaza in international waters, and towed it to Ashdod. According to Israeli officials, they ordered it to turn back before boarding it. During boarding, the passengers of the ship threw mobile phones and a laptop overboard. The passengers on the vessel surrendered to Israeli authorities without resistance.

The Israeli forces transported the crew members of the vessel from international waters to Israel. Greta Thunberg described it as a kidnapping. After arriving at the Port of Ashdod, the detainees were taken to Ben Gurion Airport where they met with consuls from their native countries. Thunberg refused to sign a document stating she entered the country illegally prior to being deported, but she did sign a document stating her intention to return home as soon as possible. She was then deported along with three other activists (André, Faiad, and Toribio) on June 10. The remaining eight, including Hassan, refused and decided to contest their deportation. They remained in custody at Givon Prison in Ramla during the legal proceedings. Dr. Baptiste André, who was also on board, alleges that Israeli authorities mocked the passengers and abused them by deliberately depriving passengers of sleep, including Thunberg.

The Israeli Ministry of Foreign Affairs later confirmed that the operation was carried out under Israeli authority. The Foreign Ministry said that the ship's aid supplies would be transferred to Gaza through "real humanitarian channels". Israel's defence minister Israel Katz, who called Thunberg "antisemitic", ordered that the crew members be shown the film Bearing Witness to the October 7th Massacre. Katz later said that the crew members refused to watch the film. He had planned to document them watching the film, but was overruled by both the Israeli Foreign Ministry as well as the Office of the Prime Minister. Ávila was held in solitary confinement after going on a hunger strike. He was released on 12 June and deported to Brazil. As of 12 June, two French citizens remained in Israel awaiting deportation, according to Adalah.

== Responses ==
=== To voyage ===
The Israeli Foreign Ministry called the vessel a "selfie yacht of celebrities", and characterized the mission as a "stunt" and called Thunberg an "antisemite". On 4 June, the Israel Defense Forces (IDF) told The Jerusalem Post that the vessel would not be allowed to dock in Gaza. On 9 June, Defense Minister Israel Katz reiterated this:

I have instructed the IDF to act to prevent the 'Madeleine' hate flotilla from reaching the shores of Gaza - and to take whatever measures are necessary to that end. To the antisemitic Greta and her fellow Hamas propaganda spokespeople, I say clearly: You should turn back - because you will not reach Gaza.

On 2 June, UN experts called for safe passage for the Madleen. Ireland's deputy prime minister and foreign affairs minister, Simon Harris, referred to the vessel Madleen as "an incredible effort to get food and medicine to the starving people of Gaza"; British Member of Parliament Jeremy Corbyn also expressed his support for the voyage. U.S. Senator Lindsey Graham wrote on Twitter, "Hope Greta and her friends can swim!" This was perceived as threatening military action against the vessel. Graham's comment was criticised by journalist Mehdi Hasan as "sociopathic, unhinged, and criminal". In June, The Telegraph and The Times reported that Zaher Birawi, an activist involved in organizing aid flotillas to Gaza, had been previously designated a "Hamas operative" by Israel. According to Le Figaro, there is little evidence for this accusation. In 2021, Birawi was awarded financial compensation after suing World-Check, a background checking database that had falsely categorized him as a terrorist.

=== To interception ===
In a press release, the Freedom Flotilla Coalition said the raid was "blatantly violat[ing] international law and def[ying] the ICJ's binding orders requiring unimpeded humanitarian access to Gaza". It said the detention of its activists was "arbitrary, unlawful, and [it] must end immediately." It also released to social media a video Greta Thunberg had pre-recorded should Israel raid the vessel. In a press release the following day, the Freedom Flotilla Coalition characterized the detainment of their activists as a "forcibl[e] abduct[ion]".

After seizing the boat, the Israeli government said that the vessel's cargo was equivalent to less than a full truckload of aid, and an Israeli government spokesperson mocked the mission as "Instagram activism". Former Israeli Navy Commander Eli Marom described Israel's handling of the Gaza Freedom Flotilla as a diplomatic failure, stating that it should have been resolved through diplomacy rather than military action, as he said had been done in previous cases. Marom said that the Gaza blockade, imposed in 2007 and "recognized by the whole world", is essential to Israel's security. He said that allowing the ship through undermined the blockade and could open the door to Iranian vessels reaching Gaza within months.

Israeli human rights organization Adalah said, "The arrest of the unarmed activists, who operated in a civilian manner to provide humanitarian aid, amounts to a serious breach of international law." Adalah said the ship was in international waters and that its destination was the "territorial waters of the state of Palestine." Hamas described the naval blockade as an instance of "state terrorism". It said the interception of the Madleen was "a flagrant violation of international law, and an attack on civilian volunteers acting out of humanitarian motives". The Council on American–Islamic Relations said the interception of the Madleen by the Israeli military was a "blatant act of international piracy and state terrorism." The human rights organization Amnesty International described Israel's seizure of the Madleen and detention of its crew as illegal.

US President Donald Trump said that Greta Thunberg, who was a passenger on the Madleen, was "strange" and "angry", and "recommended" her to take "an anger management class". Upon arriving in Paris, following her deportation from Israel, Thunberg responded, "I think the world needs a lot more young angry women, to be honest. Especially with everything going on right now." While addressing the Knesset on 11 June 2025, Argentine President Javier Milei accused Thunberg of being a "mercenary of international leftist activism" and further accused Thunberg of seeking press and cameras.

The Turkish government declared the Israeli action an "atrocious act", and a "clear violation of international law". It described Israel as acting as "a terrorist state" in the face of a "legitimate reaction by the international community against Israel's genocidal policies."

Brazil's Foreign Ministry formally requested Thiago Ávila's release, calling the interception a "flagrant violation of international law" and condemning "the continuation of severe restrictions, in violation of international humanitarian law, on the entry of basic subsistence items into the State of Palestine."

Spanish aid worker Sergio Toribio presented charges against Benjamin Netanyahu, Israel Katz, Vice Admiral David Saar Salama and other high rank commanders for war crimes and crimes against humanity in the Audiencia Nacional, the Spanish high court. The court started transacting the case on the 8th July 2025. In it, Toribio reports illegal seizing of the ship in international waters, arbitrary detention, forced interrogation and degrading treatment and subsequent deportation.

== See also ==
- Humanitarian aid during the Gaza war
- Freedom Flotilla II (2011)
- Welcome to Palestine (activists' flights planned for 2011/2012)
- Freedom Flotilla III (2015)
- Women's Boat to Gaza (2016)
- Global March to Gaza, mid-June 2025 march to enter Gaza from Egypt
- Global Sumud Flotilla

== Sources ==
- Carabott, Sarah (2 May 2025). "Gaza aid vessel 'attacked by drones' just outside Malta waters". Times of Malta.
- Goillandeau, Martin; Symons, Todd; Salman, Abeer; Magramo, Kathleen (2 May 2025). "Gaza Freedom Flotilla says ship has issued SOS, after alleged drone attack off the coast of Malta". CNN.
- Uras, Umut; Jamal, Urooba (2 May 2025). "'Strangulation': Israel kills 31 in Gaza as aid blockade starves children". Al Jazeera.
