= Freedom Flotilla II =

2011 attempt to break the Israeli blockade of the Gaza Strip

"Freedom Flotilla II – Stay Human" was a flotilla that planned to break the maritime blockade of the Gaza Strip by Israel by sailing to Gaza on 5 July 2011. Ultimately, the sailing did not take place.

The flotilla was organized by a coalition of 22 NGOs. Its name refers to the May 2010 sailing of the Gaza Freedom Flotilla, which had been raided by Israeli forces, killing a number of activists. Their stated goal was to end the blockade of Gaza "completely and permanently". Initially, 10 ships, with 1,000 activists were set to sail for Gaza, but by 28 June 2011, the number of expected participants had decreased to fewer than 300, plus a few dozen journalists, and by 7 July all but a few dozen activists had returned home.

The flotilla was publicly opposed by the United States, France, the United Kingdom, Turkey, Canada, the Middle East Quartet (consisting of the EU, Russia, the United Nations, and the United States), and United Nations Secretary General Ban Ki-moon. It was publicly supported by Hamas.

Activists on two ships, one in Greece and one in Turkey, found similar damage to their propeller shafts, and claimed that the ships had been sabotaged by Israel. It was reported that the investigation by Turkish authorities on one of the ships determined that there may have been no sabotage at all, and that any damage happened before the boat arrived in Turkey, but these media reports appeared prior to the formal investigation beginning and the Turkish coastguard enquiry has yet to announce its findings. The media reports were disputed by Irish Ship to Gaza, the owner of the vessel. Greece forbade the vessels from leaving its ports, citing safety concerns, but offered to instead send any humanitarian aid to Gaza in its own vessels, under United Nations supervision. Greece's offer was supported by Israel, the Palestinian Authority, and the United Nations, but rejected by the flotilla activists. Subsequently, two flotilla ships, the Audacity of Hope and Tahrir, disobeyed Greece's orders. They were intercepted by the Greek coast guard, brought back to shore, and a few activists were arrested. Activists responded by occupying the Spanish embassy in Athens.

Only the French ship Dignité Al Karama managed to approach Gaza. They advised the Greek authorities that their destination was the Egyptian port of Alexandria, and then turned toward Gaza. On 19 July, the ship was intercepted and boarded without incident by Israeli commandos and escorted to the Israeli port of Ashdod.

== Background ==
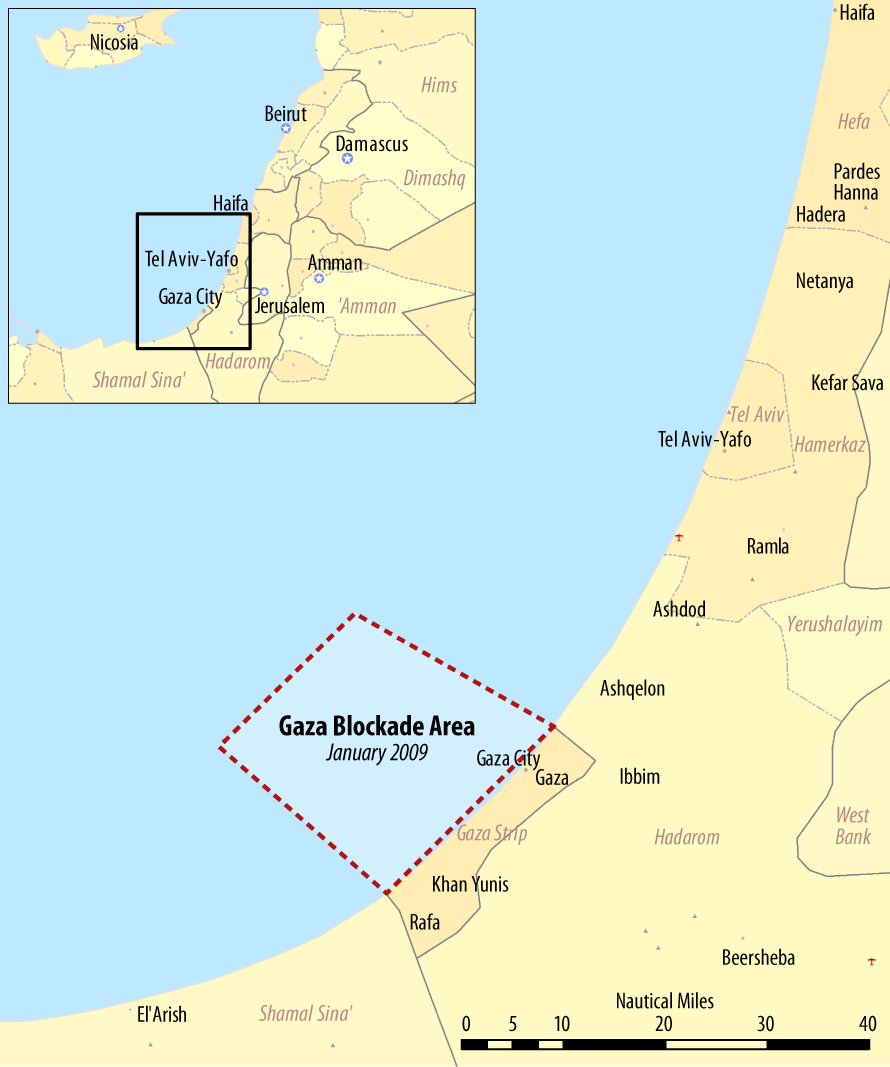
Gaza Strip naval blockade area, as published by Israel's Ministry of Transport

After the 2007 Fatah–Hamas conflict, Israel and Egypt closed off their respective borders with Gaza, preventing most goods and nearly all people from going in and out.

At the end of May 2010 a flotilla of six ships left from Turkey towards the Gaza Strip. The main purpose of the flotilla, according to its organizers, was to bring humanitarian supplies to the Gaza Strip. On 31 May 2010 the Israeli navy raided the ships some 40 kilometres away from Gaza shores. During the takeover, a violent confrontation occurred in which nine activists were killed on one of the ships and several Israeli soldiers were injured as well as dozens of passengers from several ships. At the end of the operation the ships were seized by the Israeli navy and taken to the port of Ashdod.

Following the 2010 Gaza flotilla raid, international outrage contributed to a shift in Israeli policy. Both Israel and Egypt eased their blockade, letting in more goods over land. In June 2010 Egypt decided to open the land crossings between Egypt and the Gaza Strip to transfer a minimal amount of supplies.

After the events of the 2011 flotilla raid, organizations from several countries declared their intention to send more ships to break the blockade on Gaza. As a result, the Israeli government announced that the any ships attempting to break the blockade of the Gaza Strip would be arrested.

Opinions on the legality of Israel's blockade of the Gaza strip, as well as on the use of force in international waters to maintain the blockade, are divided.

On 3 July 2011, the Greek government offered to bring humanitarian aid to Gaza themselves, but Greece's offer was turned down by the activists.

== Structure ==
=== Name ===
The flotilla was named in memory of Vittorio Arrigoni, an Italian reporter and activist whose killing by suspected members of a Palestinian Salafist group in Gaza in April 2011 "left the Palestinian activist community stunned." His favourite expression was "Stay Human".

=== Ships ===
Originally it was thought that the MV Mavi Marmara would lead the flotilla, but in mid-June, IHH announced that the ship would be unable to sail due to technical issues. As of 10 July 2011, the following ships had planned on sailing to reach Gaza:

Boat	Country of origin	No. passengers
Dignité Al Karama	France	6

The following boats did not set sail:

Boat	Country of origin	No. passengers
MV Mavi Marmara	Comoros	--
MV Saoirse	Ireland	25
Tahrir	Canada	43
Louise Michel	France	--
Stefano Chiarini	Italy	--
Gernika	Spain	50
The Audacity of Hope	United States	50
Eleftheri Mesogeios	Greece, Sweden, Norway	--
Juliano	Greece, Sweden	20

=== Participants ===
Initially, 10 ships, with 1,000 activists from 20 countries were said to be set to sail for Gaza from various European ports, with humanitarian aid, during the last days of June, or few days of July 2011. As of 28 June 2011, however, the number of expected participants had decreased to 350, plus a few dozen journalists. By 7 July, all but a few dozen activists had returned home.

=== Organizers ===
The flotilla was organized by various NGOs:

- Canadian Boat to Gaza
- European Campaign to End the Siege on Gaza
- Free Gaza Movement
- Free Palestine Movement
- IHH Humanitarian Relief Foundation
- Irish Ship to Gaza
- Rumbo a Gaza (Spain)
- Ship to Gaza Greece
- Ship to Gaza Sweden
- The International Committee to Lift the Siege on Gaza
- Un bateau français pour Gaza (France)
- US Boat to Gaza

== Events ==
=== Preparations ===
The IHH announced plans for the new flotilla, again led by the MV Mavi Marmara to depart for Gaza in June 2011. IHH President Fehmi Bülent Yıldırım said "Even if we sacrifice shahids (martyrs) for this cause, we will be on the side of justice." In June 2011, the IHH conveyed a message to the Israeli government through Turkish Jews that the organization was not interested in another clash with Israel, and a proposal that the ships be inspected in a third-party country, such as Cyprus, before being allowed into Gaza.

Plans for the new flotilla were met with international opposition. United Nations Secretary-General Ban Ki-moon urged Mediterranean governments to discourage the new flotilla and send aid through "legitimate crossings and established channels", the United States warned against the flotilla reportedly considered asking Turkey to host a peace summit between Israel and the Palestinian Authority provided that it stop it, and Canada warned its nationals not to participate in the flotilla and called it "provocative". Turkey urged activists to reconsider the need for a flotilla in light of the newly opened Rafah crossing, but also urged Israel to act wisely and avoid past mistakes.

Several Dutch journalists who were due to travel in the flotilla backed out in late June, accusing the organizers of non-transparency, particularly with regard to their relations with Hamas, restrictiveness, dishonesty and "shocking" gullibility. Journalist Eric Beauchemin said, "never have I seen a more closed organization. When we would ask critical questions they would accuse us of being unprofessional. Restrictions were imposed on us that hadn't been agreed upon beforehand."

In France, a ship purchased for the flotilla was prevented from sailing after being denied permission to dock in Marseille. The move followed intense political pressure by the Jewish community on members of Parliament, political parties, and organizations, which in turn pressured insurance companies and authorities. A day before, the IHH had announced that was rethinking its participation in the flotilla and might withdraw from the initiative. On 17 June, İHH announced that they are still part of the flotilla movement, though the Mavi Marmara pulled out from the flotilla because, according to Yıldırım, president of IHH, "after the damage caused to the Mavi Marmara [last year], we are not in a position to go to sea".

=== Initial leg ===
Two of the vessels taking part in the flotilla set sail from the French island of Corsica to Greece, to meet up with the other vessels. The vessels docked in Piraeus. However, the French vessel Dignité – Al Karama did not dock, and proceeded directly towards the Gaza Strip.

=== Vessels damaged ===
On 27 June 2011, activists announced that they had discovered damage to two of the vessels, the Juliano and MV Saoirse. Both the vessels had their propellers and pipes leading to their engines damaged. According to Flotilla spokesman Dror Feiler, there was no direct evidence Israel was involved, and he estimated the damage would take several days to repair. Other flotilla organizers suspected that the damage was the result of a sabotage operation by Israeli naval divers, and demanded that the Greek police and port authorities provide security for the vessels. Some activists announced that they themselves planned to guard the vessels. On 29 June, the MV Saoirse sustained damage while docked in Turkey. Activists claimed that the damage was caused by Israeli divers, who were able to avoid detection by guards stationed on the vessel.

A number of passengers on the flotilla said they had been mugged on the streets near the port and had mobile phones stolen, and that suspicious "fishermen" had been sighted near the ships, loitering without bait or buckets, by waters that are known to be contaminated.

Israel flatly rejected the accusations as "paranoid" and accused the activists of "living in a James Bond film."

Selcuk Unal, a spokesman for the Turkish Foreign Ministry, said that an investigation by Turkish authorities determined that there was no act of sabotage on the Irish ship, which had been docked in the Turkish port of Gocek. These claims have been disputed by Activists who called for an independent investigation into how the MV Saoirse was damaged.

Due to the damage, the MV Saoirse's plans to join the flotilla were cancelled but several Irish activists went to Corfu to join the Italian/Dutch ship, the MV Stefano Chiarini.

The Irish Ship to Gaza campaign later repaired the MV Saoirse and in November 2011, joined by the Canadian ship, the MV Tahrir, it slipped out of Turkey and sailed for Gaza. This sailing was called the "Freedom Waves to Gaza" flotilla. Both ships were intercepted by Israeli warships some 50 miles from Gaza. Both ships and 27 activists and crew – 14 Irish citizens and 13 Canadian, Australian, US and Greek citizens – were brought by force to Ashdod, imprisoned for a week and then expelled from Israel.

=== Greek travel ban ===
Greece announced that any vessels bound for Gaza were forbidden from leaving their ports. Greece emphasized safety concerns and noted that the Secretary General of the United Nations, the European Council, the Middle East Quartet and Greece itself had already urged against participation in the flotilla.

Greece offered to transfer the cargo onto Greek ships, and transport humanitarian aid through established aid channels, as requested by the UN Secretary General. The offer was supported by Israel, the Palestinian Authority and the United Nations, but rejected by the flotilla activists.

==== Violations ====
On 1 July, the American-crewed flotilla boat Audacity of Hope, which was not carrying any aid, sailed from Perama in violation of this Greek ban. It was intercepted after about ten minutes by an armed Hellenic Coast Guard boat and two Zodiac speedboats. An hours-long standoff ensued, with the coast guard initially trying to persuade the boat to turn back. Eventually, the boat was boarded by armed coast guard personnel and escorted to a Greek naval facility. Greek authorities arrested the American captain of the boat, John Klusmire, and held him on charges of endangering the lives of the boat's passengers, which is a felony, and of trying to leave port without permission. Activists responded by launching a hunger strike. Klusmire was released from custody on 5 July, but the charges against him were not dropped. "Only a fool thought we'd get to Gaza given what happened last year. We knew we'd be stopped," said Henry Norr, an activist on the boat.

On 4 July, the mainly Canadian-crewed Tahrir sailed from Crete in violation of the ban. It did so without its original Greek crew on board, and instead with "international volunteers" piloting the boat. Canadian Soha Kneen and Australian Michael Coleman were arrested after they used kayaks to surround a Greek coast guard vessel pursuing the boat. The coast guard vessel caught up to the Tahrir after about 15 minutes. Passengers attempted to protect the wheelhouse by draping it with netting and blocking doorways by sitting in front of them and linking arms. The Tahrir was sprayed with water cannons, boarded by armed officers, and towed back to port. One activist claimed that two officers boarded the boat, and one had a pistol drawn as he approached the boat's wheelhouse to take control. Canadian citizen Sandra Ruch, who was responsible for the boat, was arrested on charges of illegally sailing without permission. Fifty other passengers were detained by the Greek coastal authority. Activists claimed that the coast guard vessel rammed the boat against a cement pier and demanded that it be fixed immediately at Greece's expense. Activists Soha Kneen and Michael Coleman were tried and found guilty of obstructing the interception of the Tahrir, and were sentenced to 30 days in prison. Both had their sentences suspended and were released, but were fined 246 Euros in court costs.

In the early morning of 5 July, the French yacht Dignité – Al Karama, carrying eight passengers, evaded the Greek coast guard and left a port near Athens, but turned back on its own after several hours. Reportedly, the activists aboard the vessel did not want to be the only ones sailing to the Gaza Strip. Later, the vessel attempted to depart again in defiance of the Greek ban, but was stopped and taken to the port of Sitia on the island of Crete. Greek authorities said that during these events the yacht collided with a Greek coast guard vessel and damaged it.

On 5 July, about 20 Spanish activists from the ship Guernica occupied the Spanish embassy in Athens to protest the Greek travel ban.

=== Activist withdrawal ===
On 7 July 2011 most of the activists withdrew from the initiative and left Greece for home. Only a few dozen remained to try to convince the Greek government to end its travel ban.

=== Journey of the Dignité Al Karama ===
On 16 July, the French yacht Dignité Al Karama left the Greek island of Kastellorizo after informing Greek authorities that its destination was the Egyptian port of Alexandria. Instead, the vessel headed for Gaza. Aboard the yacht were 16 people, including three crew members and journalists from Al Jazeera, as well as Amira Hass, an Israeli journalist from Haaretz.

Dignité Al Karama was stopped by the Israeli Navy about 65 kilometers off the coast of Gaza, in international waters, after ignoring warnings that it was approaching the Gaza blockade line and must change course for either Ashdod or Egypt. The yacht was surrounded by at least three Israeli warships and boarded by Shayetet 13 naval commandos, who took over the vessel, arrested the passengers, and transferred them to a warship. The operation was conducted without any resistance from the passengers or use of violence by the commandos. The vessel was towed to Ashdod port and searched. No weapons or humanitarian aid were found on board. The passengers were taken to Ashdod, where Haaretz journalist Amira Hass was released. The remaining 15 passengers were transferred to Holon, where they were interviewed by Immigration Authority personnel and signed documents stipulating that they would leave the country within 72 hours, before being deported.

The Paris-based organisers described the Israeli naval interception as "an act of violence and an illegal act," and as "a new act of piracy against harmless people".

== Reactions ==
=== Israel ===
Israeli officials stated that the flotilla's main purpose was to cause a provocation which was designed to serve Hamas's military objectives.

Israeli authorities said that they wish to avoid clashes with the activists, and promised flotilla organizers that if they dock at the Israeli port of Ashdod, humanitarian aid would be delivered by Israel directly to Gaza. It warned the flotilla organizers that if they were to attempt to break the blockade, it would intercept the ships and that Israeli forces would defend themselves if they were attacked. To deal with any casualties that could result from a naval interception from the flotilla, the Israeli Navy converted the mess halls on two vessels into operating rooms fully equipped for surgery, and planned for them to feature a full medical staff, including surgeons and anesthesiologists. Medevac helicopters were also planned be at hand in case any of the injured needed to be evacuated to hospitalized in Israel, and Medical Corps personnel were to be deployed at the port of Ashdod.

A top Israeli naval officer warned that Israel would prevent the ships from breaking its blockade on Gaza at all costs, and that Israel would again use force if required, including boarding the ships and confronting the activists. Brig. Gen. Yoav Mordechai added, "There is an unequivocal directive from the government to enforce the naval blockade that is recognized by international law, and we will not allow it to be broken." The Israel Defense Forces (IDF) began training personnel for future flotillas. In addition to Shayetet 13 commandos, other naval and special forces units were also drilled to participate. IDF Chief of Staff Gabi Ashkenazi announced that Israel may deploy snipers to minimize troop casualties on the next flotilla. The IDF also announced that attack dogs from Unit Oketz would be deployed before soldiers to neutralize threats. In June 2011, the IDF released a video showing naval forces practicing an interception of the flotilla. The footage showed the use of high-powered water cannons aimed at vessels simulating flotilla ships, along with other means.

On 19 June 2011, Eli Marom, Commander of the Israeli Navy, was quoted as calling the flotilla a "hate flotilla".

Israeli military sources told Israeli newspapers on 27 June 2011 that some radical elements among flotilla members intended to kill soldiers who tried to board their vessels, and had equipped themselves with bags of sulfur to throw at soldiers. Multiple newspapers reported the statements. Alex Fishman, dean of Israeli military correspondents, criticized these claims and said "There isn't a shred of substance to the report that extremist elements will put up violent resistance to IDF soldiers aboard the flotilla. Neither is there any clear information regarding deadly weapons on any of the ships". He said that it can be assumed that this is considered a possibility by defense forces, along with a number of other scenarios, but was improperly turned into a definitive fact. (Note: Derfner, Larry (29 June 2011). "Hysteria, hasbara, and the flotilla". The Jerusalem Post. This article also reports that Israel's most widely read newspaper, Yedioth Ahronoth, wrote ( in Hebrew ) of the claim, "There isn't a shred of substance to the report that extremist elements will put up violent resistance to IDF soldiers aboard the flotilla. Neither is there any clear information regarding deadly weapons on any of the ships. It can be assumed that this is considered a possibility – along with many other scenarios and possibilities that come up in brainstorming sessions among military and intelligence officials preparing for the flotilla. But when a possibility such as this gets turned into a fact within the context of the Israeli hasbara campaign – this can boomerang and show Israel to be lacking in credibility.") Anonymous Israeli cabinet members described this information as "political spin", saying that information concerning violent resistance had not been presented to them. However, Strategic Affairs Minister Moshe Ya'alon later said that reports from army sources that flotilla participants were planning lethal violence were accurate. Similarly, Israel's Prime Minister's Office replied that the materials issued by the IDF spokesman are based on reliable intelligence assessments.

On the same day, Israel's Government Press Office issued a letter to foreign journalists, warning them that participating in the upcoming flotilla sailing to Gaza could result in them being barred from Israel for up to 10 years. The letter was signed by GPO director Oren Helman. The decision was rescinded by Prime Minister Benjamin Netanyahu the following day, along with a statement that journalists would be invited onto Israeli naval vessels. The Foreign Press Association welcomed the reversal.

On 27 June Israeli Foreign Minister Avigdor Lieberman stated that flotilla participants are "terror activists, seeking to create provocation and looking for blood", and that Israel plans to "deal with the flotilla properly". He added that the majority of those who had planned to join the flotilla now understand that those who wish to help can do this through legal means.

On 28 June, a YouTube video of a man called "Marc" who claims to be an activist denied from boarding the flotilla on account of his homosexuality was exposed to be a hoax. The man in the video was discovered to be Omer Gershon, an Israeli entrepreneur and public relations expert. The video was tweeted by an intern in Prime Minister Netanyahu's office. The intern said he did not know that the video was a hoax, and that he posted the video on his own private Twitter account, not on behalf of the government.

=== Other governments ===
- Canada: Foreign Affairs Minister John Baird said, "I strongly urge those wishing to deliver humanitarian goods to the Gaza Strip to do so through established channels. Unauthorized efforts to deliver aid are provocative and, ultimately, unhelpful to the people of Gaza." He added that Canadians should instead donate to the Red Cross/Red Crescent in the Gaza Strip. The department of Foreign Affairs and International Trade said: "The border around the Gaza Strip is under the control of Israeli and Egyptian authorities. Canadians who break the laws of another country are subject to the judicial system of that country. DFAIT can neither offer protection from the consequences of such actions nor override the decisions of local authorities."
- Egypt: Egypt offered to allow the flotilla to dock at the Egyptian port of El Arish. The cargo would then be transferred overland to Gaza after it has been searched.
- France: The Foreign Ministry of France strongly denounced the flotilla, calling it a "bad idea that is expected only to increase tension and be a source of conflict". "Last year's events showed that there is a danger that confrontation will result from these initiatives," it said. The French Ambassador to Israel told Israeli authorities that France expected them to "act with a sense of responsibility and moderation". France indicated that it was prepared to provide consular protection to its nationals, and reiterated its position that the Gaza blockade should be lifted.
- Gaza Strip: On 24 June 2011 Ismail Haniyeh, the Hamas Prime Minister of the Gaza Strip, was interviewed as saying "The United Nations and all international law organizations should provide protection to the second flotilla that is preparing to sail to the Gaza Strip. The world must stop Israel from intercepting the ships, We believe that it is the right of the foreign activists to arrive in the Gaza Strip, and we condemn any Israeli threats against them. It is obvious that the Israeli occupation is preparing for another crime against them". The Hamas government secretary Mohammad Awad has called other countries to support the flotilla, stating that it was a crime to continue imposing the blockade against the Gaza Strip, and that the claims that the blockade has ended are wrong.
- Greece: The Greek foreign ministry stated that "Greece's positions on the need to lift the Gaza blockade and improve the humanitarian situation in the region are well known", but added that the flotilla "does not deal with the substance of the humanitarian problem in Gaza", and urged Greek citizens as well as Greek-registered vessels not to participate in it. The Greek government later made it illegal for ships to sail from Greece to the Gaza Strip, citing safety concerns (see above).
- Ireland: The Tánaiste and Minister for Foreign Affairs, Eamon Gilmore, urged Israel to show restraint and emphasised to the Israeli ambassador that "if the flotilla does sail next week, then Israel must exercise all possible restraint and avoid any use of military force if attempting to uphold their naval blockade. In particular, I would expect that any interception of ships is conducted in a peaceful manner and does not endanger the safety of our citizens or other participants." He also urged ambassador Modai to forward this message to Israeli authorities to avoid any repetition of the violence which marked last year's flotilla. The meeting with the Israeli ambassador was conducted on 23 June. The Taoiseach, Enda Kenny, speaking in Dáil Éireann, echoed the same call.
- Netherlands: Foreign Minister Uri Rosenthal wrote a letter to the parliament calling on Dutch NGOs not to join the international flotilla headed to the Gaza Strip. He wrote that the cabinet believes that the flotilla will "not make the least contribution to a resolution of the Israeli-Palestinian conflict".
- Palestinian Authority: Mahmoud Abbas, President of the Palestinian National Authority and Chairman of the PLO, described Greece's plan to transfer humanitarian aid through established channels as positive, and expressed his support for it.
- United Kingdom: On 29 June 2011, British deputy Foreign Minister, Alistair Burt stressed that while the UK was concerned about the situation in Gaza, it did not think the delivery of aid via such a provocative route was appropriate.
- United States: The U.S. State Department warned Americans taking part in the flotilla that they may violate U.S. civil and criminal statue against delivering material support to terrorist organizations, and may face prosecution. In a travel warning, the State Department further advised U.S. citizens that they could face arrest, prosecution and deportation by Israel if they join the flotilla. State Department spokesperson Victoria Nuland said "Groups that seek to break Israel's maritime blockade of Gaza are taking irresponsible and provocative actions that risk the safety of their passengers. We urge all those seeking to provide such assistance to the people of Gaza...not to participate in actions like the planned flotilla." The U.S. Ambassador to the UN, Susan Rice, said that "there are distinct mechanisms to deliver goods to Gaza and there are no justifications to sail directly to Gaza." Texas Governor Rick Perry showed his concern regarding the flotilla by asking the U.S. attorney general to "aggressively pursue all available legal remedies to enjoin and prevent these illegal actions, and to prosecute any who may elect to engage in them in spite of your pre-emptive efforts" referring to any Americans who participate.

=== Supranational organizations ===
- The Middle East Quartet, consisting of the European Union, Russia, the United Nations and the United States, said it "urges restraint and calls on all Governments concerned to use their influence to discourage additional flotillas, which risk the safety of their participants and carry the potential for escalation. It urged those wishing to deliver goods to Gaza to do so through "established channels," which include Israeli and Egyptian crossings.
- United Nations: On 27 May 2011, UN Chief Ban Ki-moon asked for all governments to seek to discourage such flotillas. He also said that aid should go through legitimate and established channels, and called on all parties to "act responsibly" such to avoid another violent incident.

=== Non-governmental organizations ===
Shurat HaDin, an NGO based in Israel, delayed or blocked several of the vessels by legal methods, including warning insurance companies that insuring the flotilla boats might leave the companies open to prosecution for aiding a terrorist organization. In addition, Shurat HaDin sent a letter warning Inmarsat, a satellite navigation company, that it could be open to legal charges for providing communications and navigation services to ships that are part of the flotilla.

Gisha, an Israeli not-for-profit organization whose stated goal is "to protect the freedom of movement of Palestinians, especially Gaza residents," criticized the focus on humanitarian aid by flotilla organizers and the Israeli government. Sari B ashi, executive director of Gisha, said "residents of Gaza are being deliberately reduced to recipients of humanitarian aid" and that there is "no shortage of food in Gaza, but economic recovery is blocked by sweeping restrictions on the movement of goods and people".

=== Journalists ===
Canada's National Post editorialized against the flotilla, calling it a "charade". It concluded that:

The real intention of the flotilla is to break the blockade and end Hamas' political isolation. There can be only one reason why anyone would consider such an outcome desirable: The absence of a blockade would allow the free passage of arms to the terror-embracing Hamas government, which has frequently demonstrated its goal of ending Israel's existence as a nation. Israel's blockade of Gaza is a direct consequence of attacks launched from within the territory. If flotilla participants really want to ease Gazans' isolation, they should encourage Hamas to acknowledge Israel's right to exist and to forswear terrorism.

Pravda argued in favour of the flotilla, stating:

And so the world was forgetting Gaza. It forgot that the blockade was deemed illegal by the UN. They paid little attention to the complaints of people like Ilan Pappé, former professor of history at the University of Haifa, "Israel uses genocidal policies in Gaza." The lack of UN action was left to pass blankly, whose commission investigating the massacre of Freedom Flotilla I was paralyzed (as though we do not know why). It is because of this forgetfulness that Freedom Flotilla 2 was ready to sail. Remember the tragedy in Gaza is far from over. The people there are still suffering a totally illegal and unjust blockade that has lasted five years. Humanity cannot continue allowing a city to be slowly strangled.

=== Other ===
Businessmen from the Gaza Strip interviewed by Ynet said regarding the flotilla that the main problem was not importing goods into Gaza, as there was "no shortage of stock" in the territory, but the difficulty of exporting goods. However, they stressed that they were not opposed to the flotilla.

Author Alice Walker announced that she will join the flotilla and published a letter in support of the Flotilla. The letter puts the flotilla in the context of the "followers of Gandhi," and the "Jewish civil rights activists" who stood side by side with blacks in America's South. In the letter, she also rebukes Benjamin Netanyahu policies, and those in the US who back them. Fellow author Howard Jacobson criticized Walker saying that her concern for setting the children of Gaza over the children of Israel does not justify the flotilla, and that she gives no convincing reason for partaking.

Philip Missfelder, foreign policy spokesman of the Christian Democratic Union (CDU) and Christian Social Union (CSU) parties, the largest combined group of MPs in the German parliament, said on 5 July that the so-called Gaza flotilla activists "endanger peace efforts" and their action is "part of the asymmetrical warfare against Israel." He added that their actions were "not about humanitarian help, rather a confrontation with Israel". He further stated that the activists were working against the goals of Germany and the Middle East Quartet. "I welcome that the Greek authorities have decisively intervened as some activists set sail without permission," he said.

Harvard University literature professor Ruth Wisse condemned the flotilla as a "kill-the-Jews flotilla", stating that its purpose was "to discredit the Israeli attempt to protect itself and to give Hamas a free hand amassing weapons to use against Israeli civilians".

Christopher Hitchens condemned the flotilla for its cooperation with Hamas, noting Hamas' official and programmatic adoption of the antisemitic forgery The Protocols of the Elders of Zion, its expression of outrage at the death of Osama bin Laden, and its ties with Hezbollah, al-Qaeda and the regimes of Syria and Iran. He also criticized the media for "soft-centred coverage" of the affair, suggesting that pointed questions should have been asked of the flotilla participants and that the title "activists" was an inaccurate and gratuitously positive label for the participants.

According to Paul Murphy, Member of the European Parliament (MEP) and longtime Freedom Flotilla supporter, "The aim of the Flotilla is to break that siege by delivering vital medical supplies and construction material and to highlight the ongoing blockade and impact on the population."

Four Nobel Peace Laureates, Mairead Maguire, Jody Williams, Shirin Ebadi, and Rigoberta Menchú Tum, wrote a letter to UN Secretary-General Ban Ki-moon "to urge you to use your good offices in support of the humanitarian needs of the people of Gaza....by appointing a representative to inspect and seal the cargo of the boats of the Freedom Flotilla II—thus assuring the Israeli government that the boats are carrying humanitarian supplies such as toys, medical supplies, cement and educational materials."

On 7 July 2011, MIT linguistics professor Noam Chomsky, wrote "Today the U.S. and Israel are vigorously seeking to block the flotilla. U.S. Secretary of State Hillary Clinton virtually authorized violence, stating that 'Israelis have the right to defend themselves' if flotillas 'try to provoke action by entering into Israeli waters' – that is, the territorial waters of Gaza, as if Gaza belonged to Israel. Greece agreed to prevent the boats from leaving (that is, those boats not already sabotaged) – though, unlike Clinton, Greece referred rightly to 'the maritime area of Gaza.' In January 2009, Greece had distinguished itself by refusing to permit U.S. arms to be shipped to Israel from Greek ports during the vicious U.S.-Israeli assault in Gaza. No longer an independent country in its current financial duress, Greece evidently cannot risk such unusual integrity."

=== Reactions to Greek ban ===
Greek President Karolos Papoulias later visited Israel, where Israeli President Shimon Peres told him: "I thank you very much for fulfilling the UN secretary general's guidelines and stopping the flotilla. Thank you for not allowing people interested in disturbing good order and international law from coming without supervision to Gaza, which is led by a terrorist group."

Joshua Mitnick of the Christian Science Monitor reported that Greece's actions were the result of a growing relationship between Israel and Greece, including an offer of "generous military assistance", that started after Israeli–Turkish ties were damaged by the Gaza flotilla raid.

== See also ==
- Freedom Flotilla Coalition
- 2010 Gaza Freedom Flotilla
- 2010 Gaza flotilla raid
- Freedom Flotilla III (2015)
- Women's Boat to Gaza (2016)
- 2024 Gaza freedom flotilla
- May 2025 Gaza Freedom Flotilla incident
- June 2025 Gaza Freedom Flotilla
- July 2025 Gaza Freedom Flotilla
- Welcome to Palestine
