= Nisreen El-Hashemite =

Iraqi scientist and activist

- Born: July 1969 (age 56); Kuwait
- Occupations: Scientist, activist
- Relatives: Faysal I (grandfather)

Nisreen El-Hashemite (HRH Princess Dr. Nisreen Bint Prince Mohammed Bin King Faisal (I) Bin El-Sharif Hussein El-Hashemite) is an Iraqi scientist and activist, active in the promotion of women in science and women's health and development.

== Early life ==
She was born in Kuwait. She graduated in Biomedical Sciences and is a doctor in human genetics. She worked at University College London, where she developed Pre-implantation Genetic Diagnosis techniques to diagnose single genetic disorders, and at Harvard Medical School, where she investigated tuberous sclerosis.

She is the only remaining Princess of the Iraqi royal family — her grandfather, Faysal I, was the first king of modern Iraq — and is a direct descendant of Muhammad.

== Career ==
In 2007 she left her scientific career to devote herself to promoting science, technology and medicine through the Royal Academy of Science International Trust (RASIT), serving as executive director. She worked to establish an institute of medicine and public health in the Middle East and has worked in providing assistance to minors and women.

She is the founder and president of the Women in Science International League. She is an advocate for gender equality in science. She was associated with the UN's sustainability agenda, where she works towards the inclusion of female talents in science. As part of this work, in 2015 she presented a resolution to the United Nations that declared February 11 as International Day of Women and Girls in Science, in recognition of the role played by women in the world, science and technology.

El-Hashemite established the UN's World Women's Health and Development Forum. She 'is founder of MUTE International Program, to promote, protect and ensure equal human rights for the deaf and hearing-impaired; and a co-founder of Culture for Peace Program, to promote peace through arts.

== Recognition ==
In 2015 Princess Nisreen received an Honorary Doctorate in Science and Humanities from Bahçeşehir Üniversitesi in Turkey.

In 2017 she received the Muhammad Ali Humanitarian of the Year Award.

In 2020, She received the Lifetime achievements Award from the World Business Angels Investment Forum. Also in 2020, she was honored by the Pinnacle Award from the Association of Women in Science, recognizing her lifetime of innovative achievements in STEM and commitment to workplace diversity.
