= Adalah (legal center) =

Israeli human rights organization

Adalah – The Legal Center for Arab Minority Rights in Israel
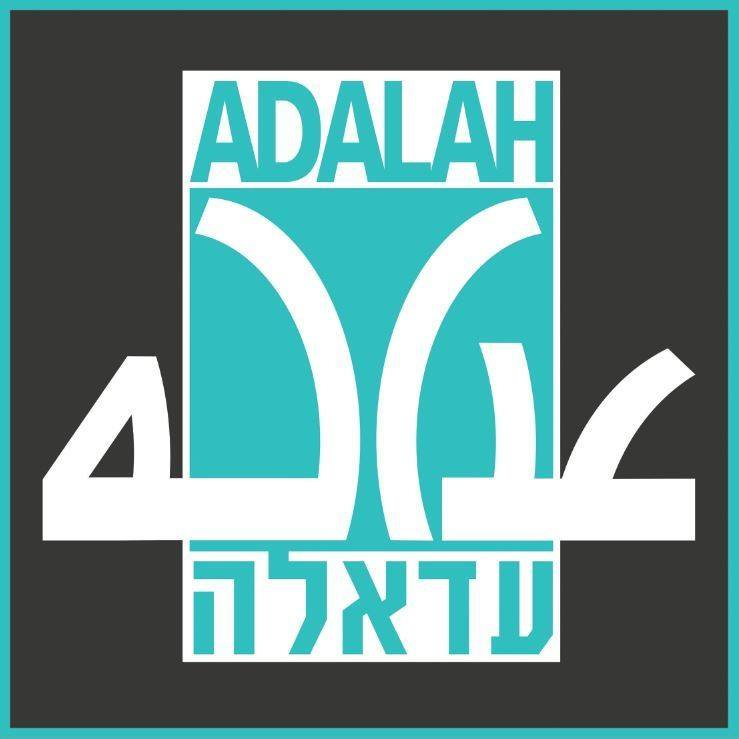
- Founded: 1996; 30 years ago
- Type: Non-profit; NGO
- Purpose: Human rights, Arab citizens of Israel, minority rights, indigenous rights, civil and political rights, economic, social and cultural rights, prisoners' rights, land and planning rights
- Location(s): Haifa, Israel (headquarters); Beersheba, Israel (field office)
- Region served: Israel and the Palestinian Territories
- Method: Impact litigation, legal consultation, international advocacy, education, training, publication, media outreach
- Website: www.adalah.org/en

Adalah – The Legal Center for Arab Minority Rights in Israel (Note: Hebrew: עדאלה – המרכז המשפטי לזכויות המיעוט הערבי בישראל, romanized: 'Adalah – HaMerkaz HaMishpati LiZhuyot HaMi'ut Ha'Aravi B'Yisrael; Arabic: عدالة – المركز القانوني لحماية حقوق الأقلية العربية في إسرائيل, romanized: ʿAdāla – al-Markaz al-Qānūnī li-Huqūq al-ʾAqalliyya l-ʿArabiyya fī ʾIsrāʾīl; ʿadāla meaning 'justice' in Arabic.) is a human rights organization and legal center.

Adalah's goals are "achieving individual and collective rights of the Arab-Palestinian minority in Israel" and protecting "the human rights of Palestinians living under occupation, based on international humanitarian law and international human rights law".

The organization was founded in November 1996; it is nonpartisan and not-for-profit. Adalah's founder and general director is lawyer Hassan Jabareen.

== Mission and philosophy ==
Adalah attempts to influence Israeli public discourse through media outreach and campaigning. It regularly participates in Israeli and international academic conferences.

Historian Ilan Pappe describes Adalah's philosophy as "that the personal autonomy of the individual was a right that had to be fiercely protected, and that this right included also the collective rights of the group to which the individual belonged."

== Legal advocacy ==
Many of Adalah's cases involve first-time legal challenges and affect Arab citizens as a collective group. Adalah's legal advocacy focuses on appealing to the Israeli Supreme Court. Between 1996 and 2000, it brought over twenty cases before the court dealing with equality for Arab citizens, including language rights cases, budgets of the Ministry of Religious Affairs, health and education in the unrecognized Bedouin villages in Israel.

Adalah's legal department is divided into three units: Land and Planning; Economic, Social, and Cultural; and Civil and Political (including Criminal Justice and the Occupied Palestinian Territory).

== International advocacy ==
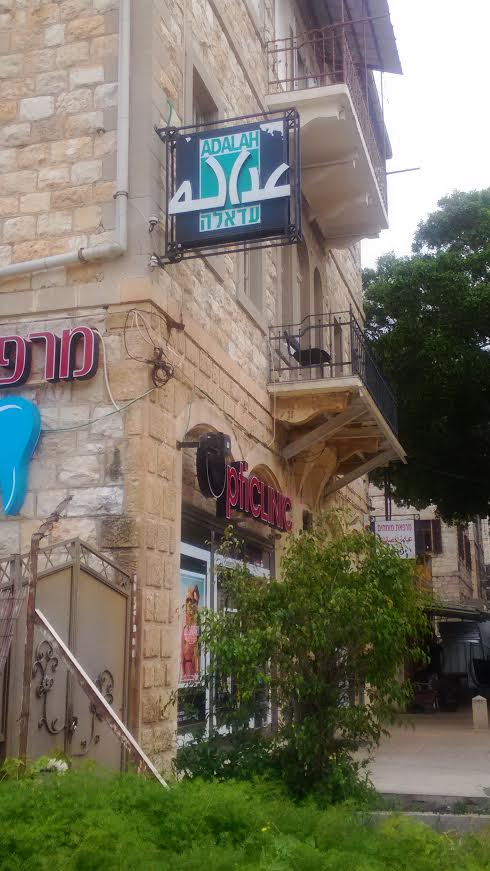
Headquarters in Haifa

Adalah's international advocacy work focuses on United Nations human rights bodies, European Union bodies, embassies/foreign diplomats based in Israel, and cooperating with international human rights organizations and networks.

Adalah has conducted regular interventions to UN committees in its reviews of Israel's compliance with human rights conventions.

Adalah and its partners played a leading role in the passing of a European Parliament Resolution on 5 July 2012 condemning Israel's practice of forced displacement against Palestinian Arabs in the Occupied Territory (West Bank and East Jerusalem) and in the Naqab (Negev) in Israel.

== October 2000 events and the Or Commission ==
In October 2000, Israeli security forces used live ammunition and rubber-coated bullets against Palestinian Arab citizens at demonstrations, killing 13 people. A Commission of Inquiry was established and Adalah represented the family members of the 13 Palestinian citizens of Israel killed by the police, and the Arab political leaders who received warnings from the commission.

The Or Commission found that there was no justification for the excessive use of lethal force that caused the 13 deaths. It found that in October 2000 snipers were used to disperse demonstrations for the first time since 1948, and that this sniper fire, which led to the death and injury of citizens, was illegal and not grounded in the internal regulations of the police governing the use of live fire. Similarly, the Or Commission determined that the firing of rubber-coated steel bullets, which produced fatal results, was also contrary to internal police regulations.

== Unrecognized Arab Bedouin villages ==
By the 1990s, there were about 45 Arab Bedouin villages in the Naqab (Negev) that were not officially recognized by the state, even though many of these villages had existed before the state's establishment or residents were moved there by the state itself during the 1950s. Because of their "unrecognized" status, these villages do not receive basic services such as water, healthcare, schools, or safe roads.

In December 1997, Adalah represented 12 of the largest unrecognized villages in the Negev "in a demand for the establishment of basic medical clinics", where mothers and children seeking treatment had to travel long distances with no public transportation in order to access a health facility. The Bedouin villages in the Naqab have the country's highest rate of infant mortality and the lowest level of immunization.

By the mid-2000s ten of the 45 villages were accepted by the state as "in the process of recognition". But the state has not provided full services entailed by that recognition and Adalah continues to pressure the government to fulfill its commitments to the villages.

=== The Prawer plan ===
Stopping the implementation of the "Law for the Regulation of Bedouin Settlement in the Negev" (the "Prawer plan") is a legislative focus of Adalah. According to human rights groups, the Plan will oversee the demolition of 35 unrecognized Bedouin villages in the Naqab and the forced relocation of 40,000–70,000 Bedouin citizens to recognized townships.

Adalah is representing several villages before the courts to challenge their eviction and demolition orders, including the villages of Umm el-Hieran and Atir, which are to be destroyed to build a Jewish town and a forest in their respective locations. Adalah regularly submits petitions and letters in partnership with other NGOs and civil society groups, such as the Association for Civil Rights in Israel, Bimkom, the Negev Co-Existence Forum, and the Regional Council of Unrecognized Villages.

== Current cases ==
Among others, Adalah is currently involved in the following legal cases:

- Representing activists from the Freedom Flotilla Coalition ship Madleen, whom Israeli authorities detained after the vessel was intercepted in international waters on June 9, 2025, as it attempted to deliver humanitarian aid to Gaza. Adalah is providing legal assistance to challenge the legality of their seizure and detention, challenging the conditions under which they were held, and representation in legal proceedings. The group is also representing activists from the FFC's Handala vessel, who similarly challenged the Israeli blockade and were arrested by Israel on 26–27 July 2025.
- Representing Arab MK Mohammed Barakeh (Democratic Front for Peace and Equality - Hadash) on a criminal indictment charging him with four alleged offenses of assaulting or insulting police officers resulting from his participation in anti-Wall and anti-War demonstrations between 2005 and 2007. The court accepted Adalah's arguments concerning parliamentary immunity, and dismissed two of four charges in 10/11.
- Representing residents of Al-Araqib and human rights activists on criminal indictments related to protest activities concerning the repeated demolition of the Arab Bedouin village of Al-Araqib in the Naqab.
- Demanding the cancellation of an Israel Land Administration (ILA) policy permitting the marketing and allocation of Jewish National Fund (JNF)-controlled lands by the ILA through bids open only to Jews.
- Seeking the cancellation of evacuation lawsuits against about 1,000 Arab Bedouin citizens of Israel living in the unrecognized village of Atir-Umm el-Hieran in the Naqab and demanding its recognition by the state.
- Petitioning the Supreme Court on behalf of Gaza residents and Palestinian and Israeli human rights organizations challenging the ban on Palestinian residents of Gaza from entering Israel to access the courts for tort damages cases filed against the Israeli security forces. The state's prevention of entry is resulting in the dismissal of hundreds of compensation lawsuits. In effect, the state is exempting itself from all damages claims.
- Petitioned the High Court of Justice and government ministries to publish public health information regarding COVID-19 in Arabic. Government ministries acknowledged their failure and at last began publishing in Arabic, though they continue to publish more detailed information in Hebrew than in Arabic.
