= Freedom Flotilla Coalition =

Organization attempting to break Gaza blockade

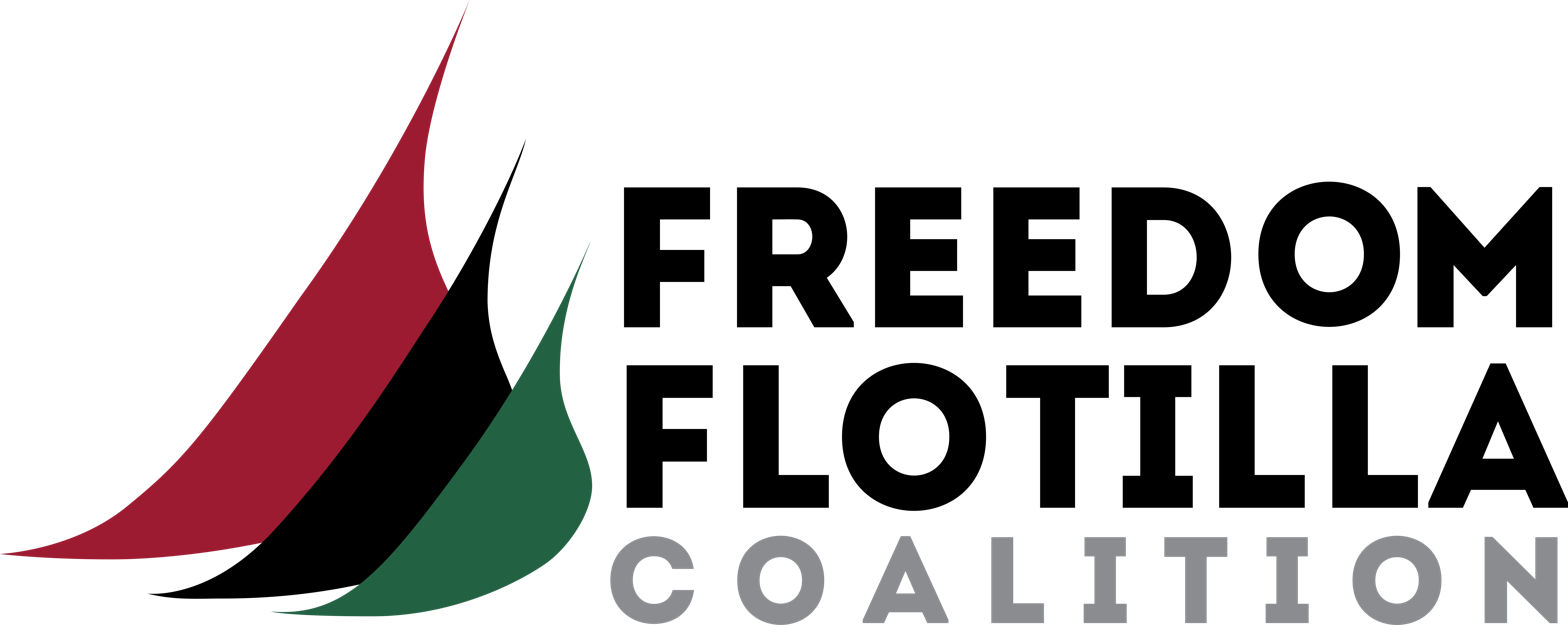
- Abbreviation: FFC
- Formation: June 2010; 16 years ago
- Type: Civil society; Humanitarian coalition
- Purpose: Break the Gaza blockade, deliver humanitarian aid and establish a people-led humanitarian corridor
- Region served: Gaza Strip, Mediterranean region
- Members: see § Members
- Website: freedomflotilla.org

The Freedom Flotilla Coalition (FFC) is a grassroots international solidarity movement formed in 2010 responsible for numerous Gaza Freedom Flotillas. It coordinates civilian-led aid missions by sea to break the Israeli blockade of the Gaza Strip.

The Freedom Flotilla Coalition was formed following Israel's raid on the 2010 Gaza Freedom Flotilla, ended in the death of nine activists on board in international waters. Since then, it has organized efforts aimed at raising global awareness of the humanitarian needs of Gaza and demanded unrestricted maritime access to deliver essential aid. In addition, the coalition has demanded an end to the Israeli occupation and that the international community act to hold Israel accountable for its violations of human rights and international law.

Israeli authorities have regularly thwarted the coalition's attempts, seizing—sometimes destroying—cargos and ships. Passengers and crews are often detained, though they have been killed in some instances. There have been multiple reports of drone attacks on flotillas, including an unconfirmed attack in May 2025, and over a dozen separate attacks reported against the Global Sumud Flotilla in September 2025, when Israeli submarine-released drones dropped various chemical devices, incendiary devices, and explosives onto the ships of the flotilla.

== Flotillas ==
Gaza Freedom Flotilla vessels and convoys have attempted to break the blockade of Gaza since 2010. The first flotilla with six ships was launched by what would then become the Freedom Flotilla Coalition, and were subsequently raided by Israeli forces. Since then, attempts with the Freedom Flotilla II in 2011, Freedom Flotilla III in 2015, Women's Boat to Gaza in 2016, Just Future for Palestine Flotilla in 2018, and flotillas in June and July 2025, have all been intercepted, raided or attacked by Israeli forces. In August, the Freedom Flotilla Coalition joined the Global Sumud Flotilla, and began launching a series of flotilla convoys towards Gaza.

== Members ==
Key:

Founding member

Organization	Country	Website
European Campaign to End the Siege on Gaza	International	—N/a
Free Gaza Movement	International	freegaza.org
International Committee for Breaking the Siege of Gaza	International	breakgazasiege.net
Free Gaza Australia	Australia	Free Gaza Australia on Facebook
Freedom Flotilla Brasil	Brazil	Freedom Flotilla Brasil on Instagram
Canadian Boat to Gaza	Canada	canadaboatgaza.org
Gaza Freiheits Flottille	Germany	Gaza Freiheits Flottille on Instagram
Ship to Gaza Greece	Greece	—N/a
Gaza Freedom Flotilla Cobh Ireland	Ireland	Gaza Freedom Flotilla Cobh on Instagram
Freedom Flotilla Italia	Italy	freedomflotilla.info
MyCARE Malaysia	Malaysia	mycare.org.my
Kia Ora Gaza Aotearoa	New Zealand	kiaoragaza.wordpress.com
Ship to Gaza Norway	Norway	shiptogaza.no
Palestine Solidarity Alliance South Africa	South Africa	palestinesa.co.za
Rumbo a Gaza Spain	Spain	rumboagaza.org
Ship to Gaza Sweden	Sweden	shiptogaza.se
IHH Humanitarian Relief Foundation	Turkey	ihh.org.tr
Mavi Marmara Türkiye	Turkey	mavimarmara.org
US Boats to Gaza	United States	usboatstogaza.org

Additional organizations the FFC has partnered with include Miles of Smiles, Plateforme des ONG françaises pour la Palestine, the Union of Agricultural Work Committees (UAWC), We Are Not Numbers (WANN) and Forensic Architecture.

== See also ==
- Humanitarian aid during the Gaza war
- Global March to Gaza (mid-June 2025 march to enter Gaza from Egypt)
- Welcome to Palestine (activists' flights planned for 2011/2012)
