= May 2025 drone attack on Gaza Freedom Flotilla =

2025 suspected drone attack on humanitarian vessel

In the early morning on 2 May 2025, a vessel organized by the Freedom Flotilla Coalition, carrying 16 to 30 (Note: The exact number of people aboard the Conscience during the Gaza Freedom Flotilla incident on 2 May 2025, is disputed. The Freedom Flotilla Coalition, which organized the voyage, stated there were 30 people on board, mostly human rights activists and humanitarian workers. The Maltese government and several news agencies reported 16 people on board: 12 crew members and 4 civilian passengers.) human rights activists and humanitarian aid destined for the Gaza Strip, was attacked by drones in international waters off the coast of Malta. The incident occurred approximately 14–17 nautical miles (26–31 km) from Malta, outside its territorial waters. There is no independent confirmation of the nature of the incident, although Cyprus responded by dispatching a rescue boat, and the Armed Forces of Malta (AFM) sent a patrol boat to assist with extinguishing the fire.

Maltese authorities offered assistance, but insisted on inspecting the vessel first. The captain declined the offer.

== Background ==
Since 9 October 2023, Israel imposed a "total blockade" on Gaza following the Hamas attack, initially cutting off food, water, medicine, fuel and electricity before partially easing restrictions with limited aid entering from 21 October 2023. Despite some humanitarian access, Israel continued severe restrictions, blocking 56% of aid to northern Gaza in January 2024 and preventing food deliveries to 1.1 million Palestinians by February 2024. As of 2 March 2025, Israel has completely blocked all supplies from entering Gaza, marking the longest complete closure in the blockade's history. The blockade has created imminent famine conditions exacerbated by airstrikes on food infrastructure, with aid organizations reporting markets empty and children malnourished. Israel has conditioned lifting the blockade on the return of hostages taken by Hamas, a stance criticized as collective punishment and a potential war crime that has significantly worsened Gaza's humanitarian crisis.

The ship, identified as Conscience and registered under a Palau flag, was transporting humanitarian aid and activists as part of a Freedom Flotilla Coalition mission to protest the Israeli blockade of the Gaza Strip through non-violent direct action. The blockade has been a point of international controversy and has seen similar flotilla missions intercepted in the past, including the deadly 2010 Gaza flotilla raid on the MV Mavi Marmara. Climate activist Greta Thunberg, former US Army Colonel Ann Wright, as well as 40 other activists had planned on boarding the vessel in Malta.

The ship used by the flotilla was Conscience (IMO: 7211440), formerly known as The Majestic. According to the Nordic Monitor, the vessel is owned by the Turkish non-governmental organization Foundation for Human Rights and Freedoms and Humanitarian Relief (İHH). The İHH has been described by some sources as having close ties to Turkish state institutions and is designated as a terrorist organization by Israel. Palau revoked its flag from the Conscience prior to the attack, and authorities in Malta, Greece and Turkey have threatened to confiscate the ship if it comes to port.

== Incident ==
The boat had sailed from Bizerte, Tunisia, on 29 April, anchoring to the east of Malta at midday on 1 May. The boat was on its way to Malta to collect more aid and pick up 44 passengers. According to reports, while still at anchor, the vessel was struck shortly after midnight local time on 2 May by what were described as missiles launched from two drones. The projectiles appeared to target the ship's generators. At the time communication was lost, the drones were reportedly still circling above the vessel. The incident is believed to have occurred 17 nautical miles (31 km; 20 mi) (Note: While some reports cite 17 kilometers, this is likely a misstatement or confusion between kilometers and nautical miles. The authoritative and majority position is that the incident was at 17 nautical miles, which is outside territorial waters.) off the coast of Malta, outside Malta's territorial waters. While reports indicate a fire and a hull breach, the full extent of damage has not been independently verified.

The Freedom Flotilla Coalition reported that the ship was struck twice by drones at around 00:23 (CEST), with both attacks targeting the vessel's generators at the front of the ship. The strikes caused a fire and a breach in the hull, placing the vessel at imminent risk of sinking. Videos posted by the coalition on social media purportedly show flames and smoke aboard the ship, and separate footage captured the sound of two explosions, though these videos have not been independently verified. The ship, identified as the Conscience and registered under a Palau flag, was transporting humanitarian supplies and activists as part of a mission to challenge the Israeli blockade of the Gaza Strip through non-violent direct action. The Israeli military said it was looking into reports of the attack which took place 1,200 miles (1,900 km) away from Israel.

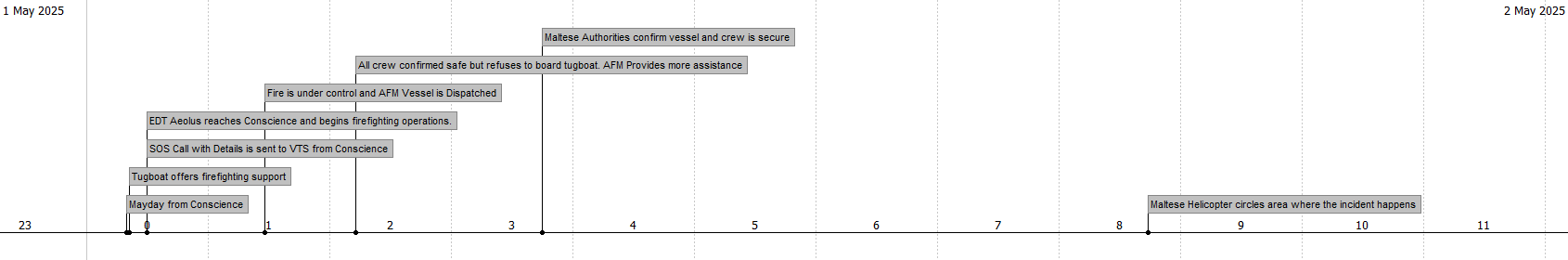
This timeline visualizes key events and emergency responses following the drone attack on the Gaza Freedom Flotilla vessel Conscience in international waters off Malta.

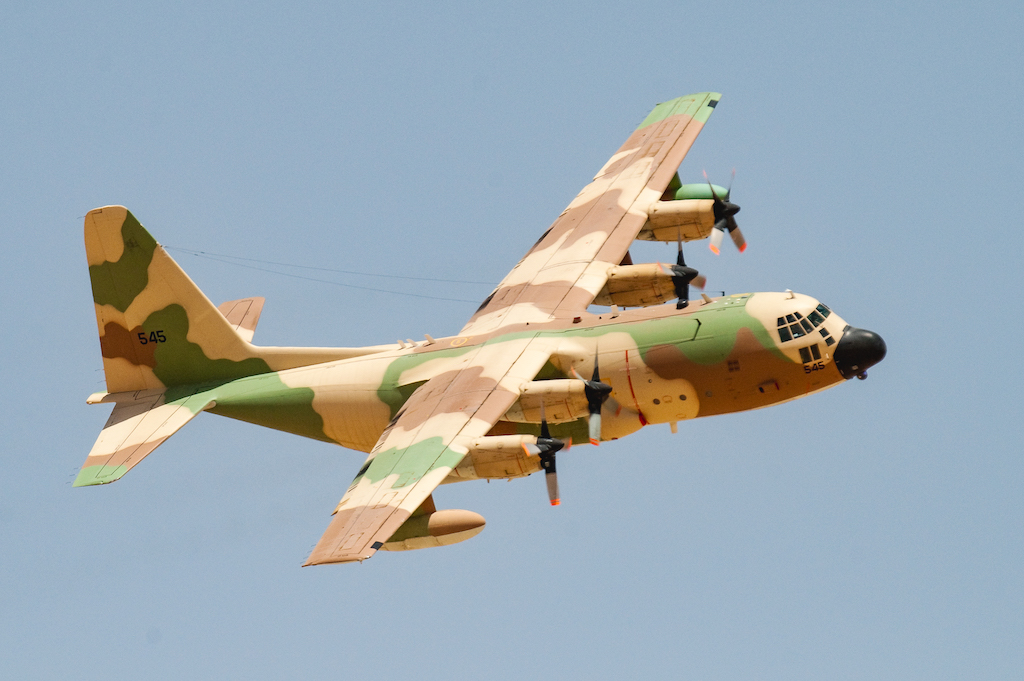
An IDF C-130, similar to the one which flew over Malta on 1 May

The Freedom Flotilla Coalition attributed responsibility for the drone attack to Israel. On 1 May, an Israeli Air Force C-130 Hercules aircraft was tracked departing from Israel and flying toward Malta, according to flight-tracking data from ADS-B Exchange. Although the aircraft did not land at Malta International Airport, it maintained a low altitude—below 5,000 feet (1,500 m)—while flying close to eastern Malta for an extended period. Whether the aircraft breached Maltese airspace is debated. The aircraft's presence occurred several hours prior to the incident. The C-130 subsequently returned to Israel approximately seven hours after its departure.

== Aftermath ==
=== Immediate response ===
Our vessel is currently 17 kilometers off the coast of Malta in international waters, and it has been subjected to a drone attack twice... The ship is sinking.

— Yasemin Acar, Freedom Flotilla Coalition spokesperson

Following the attack, the vessel issued a distress signal. As it did, however, someone was reported to have impersonated the crew on the same channel, saying that help was no longer needed. Regardless, Cyprus responded by dispatching a rescue boat, and the Armed Forces of Malta (AFM) sent a patrol boat to assist with extinguishing the fire and potentially rescuing those on board. The Cypriot boat was said to not provide the electrical support needed (according to Freedom Flotilla, the attack disabled the ship's generating capability).

After firefighting operations were started by 01:28 (CEST) on 2 May, an AFM vessel was dispatched. By 02:13, all crew were confirmed safe but refused to board the tug.

The vessel suffered a breach of its hull and was in danger of sinking. By 03:45, the Maltese Government reported that the vessel was also secure. There were conflicting reports of the number of people on board; while the Maltese government reported there were 16 people on board, (12 crew and 4 civilians), Gaza Freedom Flotilla said there were 15 crew and 15 civilians.

=== Reactions ===
European Parliament member Ana Miranda Paz among many others condemned the recent attack and blamed it on Israel. In a statement, Maltese political party AD+PD expressed solidarity and anger at what it said appeared to be "a terrorist attack by Israel". Greta Thunberg characterized the incident as an example of the disregard for international law and human rights. She expressed concern for the safety of the individuals aboard the vessel and noted the proximity of the alleged attack to a European Union member state. An anonymous Maltese military source was quoted by the Times of Malta saying, "What happened is very serious. Israel appears to have flown an unauthorised military aircraft over Malta, [a European Union] state and in breach of our neutrality. This is very serious." The Flotilla Coalition protested the silence of European nations on Israel's participation in the alleged attack on the civilian vessel.

Maltese authorities have publicly denied any breach of their airspace. After the crew called on the Maltese Government to allow them to enter Maltese Territorial waters on the afternoon of 3 May, 3–4 miles (4.8–6.4 km) inland to which their request was rejected. Maltese NGOs have called for a public demonstration to demand the government grant emergency entry, which was cancelled after observing positive developments regarding the Conscience vessel. The Government stated that the crew and people were again offered rescue on 3 May, which was again refused. The Prime Minister of Malta, Robert Abela, offered assistance on the condition that authorities be allowed to inspect the ship and cargo, but the captain declined the offer.

=== The next mission ===
The Freedom Flotilla Coalition said it would use another boat, named the Madleen, to continue its mission to deliver aid to Gaza. It hoped "to challenge Israel's criminal blockade and help establish a sea corridor to Gaza that is not controlled by the Israeli occupier".

== See also ==
- 2024 Gaza freedom flotilla
- Freedom Flotilla II (2011)
- Freedom Flotilla III (2015)
- Global March to Gaza (2025)
- Humanitarian aid during the Gaza war
- Women's Boat to Gaza (2016)
- Welcome to Palestine (activists' flights planned for 2011/2012)
