= Women's Boat to Gaza =

2016 attempt to break the Israeli blockade of the Gaza Strip

The Women's Boat to Gaza (WBG) was an initiative by the Freedom Flotilla Coalition in 2016 to challenge the Israeli naval blockade of the Gaza Strip. The WBG consisted of an entirely female crew and one ship, Zaytouna-Oliva. It started from Barcelona on 14 September 2016 and visited Ajaccio, Corsica and Messina, Sicily along the way. On 5 October 2016, the Israeli Navy intercepted the Women's Boat to Gaza some 14 miles outside the 20-mile "Security Zone" off the Palestinian coast, and detained its crew members, who were taken to the Israeli port of Ashdod. The activists were subsequently deported to their home countries.

== Goals and objectives ==
The Freedom Flotilla Coalition launched the Women's Boat to Gaza to raise awareness of the role of women in advancing the Palestinian struggle in the Palestinian Territories and diaspora. The Women's Boat to Gaza also supported the goals of the Boycott, Divestment and Sanctions campaign:

1. Ending its occupation and colonization of all Arab lands and dismantling the Wall;
2. Recognizing the fundamental rights of the Arab-Palestinian citizens of Israel to full equality; and
3. Respecting, protecting and promoting the rights of Palestinian refugees to return to their homes and properties as stipulated in UN Resolution 194.

== Participants ==
The Women's Boat to Gaza had a total of 26 participants. The voyage was divided into three legs: Barcelona to Ajaccio, Ajaccio to Messina, and Messina to Gaza. Each leg was crewed by thirteen volunteers with several members alternating at different legs of the voyage.

State	Personality	Status
Sweden	Malin Björk	Member of the European Parliament of the Swedish Left Party.
Israel	Yehudit Barbara Ilany	Photographer, freelancer.
Chile	Paulina de los Reyes	Academic, Stockholm University.
Malaysia	Dr. Fauziah Hasan	Physician.
Australia	Madeleine Habib	Activist and seafarer.
Spain	Rosana Pastor	Actress, director/activist, and politician.
United States	Ann Wright	Boat leader, retired United States Army colonel and diplomat.
Spain	Lucia Muñoz Lucena	Telesur journalist.
Spain	Jaldia Abubakra	Activist.
Canada	Wendy Goldsmith	Social worker and boat leader.
Norway	Synne Sofie Reksten	Student and crew.
Sweden	Emma Rinqvist	Music teacher and crew.
United States	Kitt Kittredge	Peace activist.
United States	LisaGay Hamilton	Actress.
Algeria	Khadija Benguenna	Al Jazeera journalist.
Tunisia	Latifa Habachi	Tunisian lawyer, politician, and Member of the Assembly of the Representatives of the People.
Egypt	Hayat Al Yamani	Al Jazeera Mubasher Al-‘Amma journalist.
Malaysia	Norsham Binti Abubakr	Support Services Manager at An-Nur Specialist Hospital.
United Kingdom (Northern Ireland)	Mairead Maguire	Peace activist and Nobel Peace Prize laureate.
New Zealand	Marama Davidson	Green Member of Parliament, environmentalist, and human rights activist.
Sweden	Jeannette Escanilla	Swedish Left Party Member of Parliament.
Algeria	Samira Douaifia	Member of the Algerian People's National Assembly.
South Africa	Leigh-Ann Naidoo	Beach volleyball player.
Russia	Hoda Rakhme	Al Jazeera camerawoman and editor.
United Kingdom (England)	Mina Harballou	Al Jazeera journalist.
Spain	Sandra Barrilaro	Photographer.

== Ships ==
The Zaytouna-Oliva was the sole ship in the Women's Boat to Gaza expedition. The Oliva was named after a civil protection boat that the Italian journalist Vittorio Arrigoni sailed in prior to his murder by a Palestinian militant group in Gaza in 2011. A second ship called the Amal-Hope was originally due to participate but pulled out subsequently.

== Organization partners ==
Organizations and campaigns participating in the Women's Boat to Gaza have included Sweden Ship to Gaza, Norway Ship to Gaza, Canadian Boat to Gaza, the Italian Freedom Flotilla, the South African Palestine Solidarity Alliance, the Spanish Rumbo a Gaza, International Committee to Break the Siege of Gaza, US Boat to Gaza, the New Zealand-based Kia Ora Gaza, and Free Gaza Australia.

== See also ==
- 2010 Gaza Freedom Flotilla
- 2010 Gaza flotilla raid
- Freedom Flotilla II (2011)
- Freedom Flotilla III (2015)
- 2024 Gaza freedom flotilla
- Gaza Freedom Flotilla incident (2025)
- June 2025 Gaza Freedom Flotilla
- Welcome to Palestine
