= 2025 Global Sumud Flotilla =

2025 attempt to break Israeli blockade of the Gaza Strip

Global Sumud Flotilla

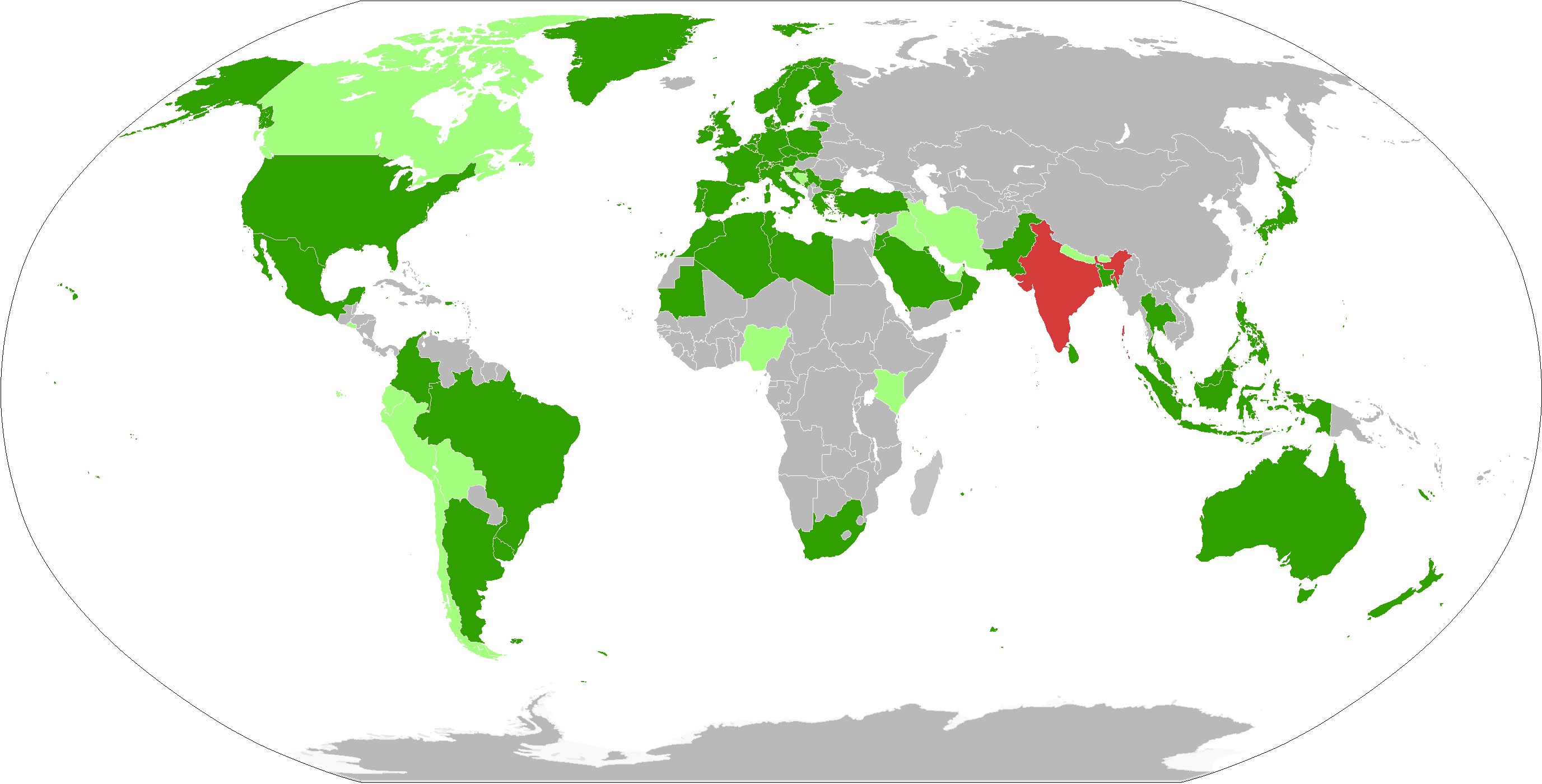
- Participating countries according to the GSF's official list Countries that are not on the official list of participants but saw citizens or public figures of their nation take part in the initiative (Note: Attributed to multiple sources:) Countries that were supposed to participate but ultimately did not
- Abbreviation: GSF
- Formation: July 2025; 1 year ago
- Founders: Freedom Flotilla Coalition; Global Movement to Gaza; Maghreb Sumud Flotilla; Sumud Nusantara
- Type: Civil society; Humanitarian coalition
- Purpose: Break the Gaza blockade, deliver humanitarian aid and establish a humanitarian corridor
- Region served: Gaza Strip, Mediterranean region
- Members: 500+ sailing; 15,000+ registered
- Website: globalsumudflotilla.org

The Global Sumud Flotilla (GSF; Arabic: أسطول الصمود العالمي, romanized: Usṭūl aṣ-Ṣumūd al-ʿĀlamī), sometimes referred to as the Global Freedom Flotilla (أسطول الحرية العالمي, Usṭūl al-Ḥurriyya al-ʿĀlamī), was an international, civil society-led maritime initiative launched in mid-2025, which attempted to break the Israeli blockade of the Gaza Strip but was thwarted in an intercept by Israeli naval forces. It is named after ṣumūd, Arabic for 'steadfastness' or 'resilience'. The initiative emerged in July 2025, organised by coalition of Freedom Flotilla Coalition (FFC), Global Movement to Gaza, Maghreb Sumud Flotilla and Sumud Nusantara, during the Gaza war. The flotilla comprised over 40 vessels with 500 participants from more than 44 countries, making it the largest civilian-led convoy of its kind in history. Some attempts to break the Israeli blockade were successful before 2010, but since then ships have been intercepted or attacked by Israeli forces, including an attack by drones in May 2025 and interceptions in international waters in June and July 2025. By early 3 October, Israel had intercepted all vessels of the flotilla, after drone attacks had been reported, and naval vessels dispatched to provide assistance. The flotilla was the first unauthorized naval humanitarian mission to come within 70 nautical miles (130 km) of the Gaza coast since the imposition of the blockade in 2009.

The flotilla began to set sail late August 2025 with delegations and convoys departing Otranto, Genoa and Barcelona, followed by Catania, Syros and Tunis early September. On 3 September, the Italian convoy reached Sicily and Tunisian vessels began converging on Tunis. Four days later, part of the Spanish convoy arrived in northern Tunisia, where in the early hours of 9 September, a fire broke out on one of the main vessels, suspected to be a drone attack. A second incendiary attack was reported the following night on another vessel. On 19 September, the Spanish and Tunisian convoys, having merged in Sicily, departed heading towards Greece. On 22 September, the Greek convoy then departed from Milos heading towards Crete, arriving the following day. On the night of 24 September, eleven vessels were attacked by drones. On 28 September, with the convoys merged in Crete, the flotilla departed to continue its journey towards Gaza. Between 1 and 2 October, the Israeli Navy intercepted the ships, detaining hundreds of people. In the evening of the interception, spontaneous protest took place across various locations in Europe in response. Three days later, 42 detainees began a hunger strike in protest, and by 6 October, over a hundred activists had been deported from Israel. Participants reported mistreatment during detention, that was dismissed by the Israeli foreign ministry, and the interception was condemned by several political figures. On 8 October, a subsequent flotilla consisting of 9 ships, organised by FFC and Thousand Madleens to Gaza, was intercepted with participants detained about 120 nautical miles from Gaza.

The initiative received support from over a dozen foreign ministers, Italian politicians and political parties, MPs in Spain and Portugal, the President of Colombia Gustavo Petro, and the UN Special Rapporteur on the occupied Palestinian territories, Francesca Albanese. In contrast, Israeli minister of national security Itamar Ben-Gvir stated that participants should be imprisoned as terrorists and the Israeli foreign ministry vowed to stop the flotilla. In response to attacks on the flotilla, the Italian ministry of defense sent Italian Navy ships to assist the flotilla and Spanish Prime Minister Pedro Sánchez dispatched a Spanish Navy vessel in case of a rescue operation. With the navy vessels retreating as the flotilla reached closer to Gaza, the Ministry of National Defense of Turkey confirmed it would continue to ensure the safety of the flotilla if required. The European Commission stated that it does not support aid flotillas to Gaza.

== Background ==
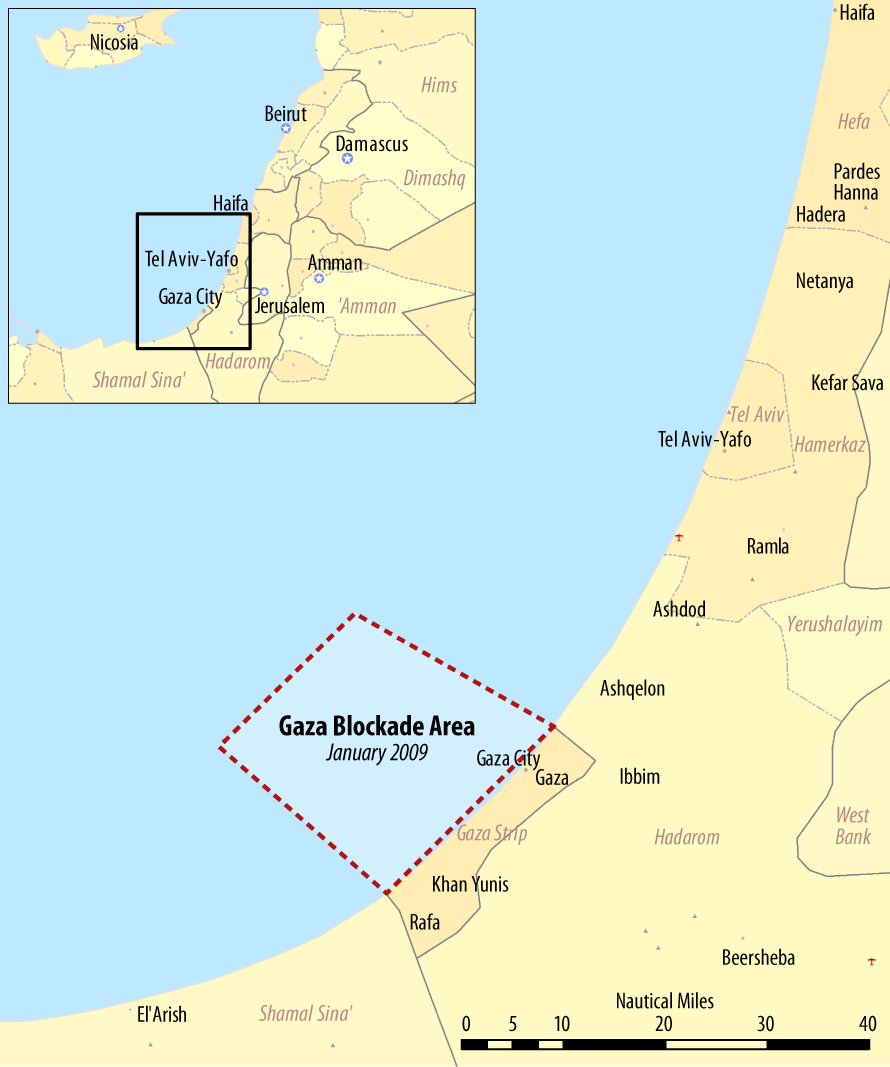
A notional map showing the waters off Gaza under Israeli blockade. The blockade extends 150 nautical miles (about six times further into the sea from what is shown). (Note: The blockade is for ships coming in. Palestinian fishermen are under a different set of restrictions (see the inset in the center-right of this image).)

Israel has imposed a naval blockade of the Gaza Strip since January 2009. Officially, Israel's blockade extends for 150 nautical miles.

In 2010, the first Gaza Freedom Flotilla consisting of six ships was raided by Israeli forces, resulting in 10 participants killed and dozens wounded by Israeli commandos, causing significant international outrage. Since then, attempts in 2011, 2015, 2016, 2018 and 2025 have all been intercepted, raided or attacked by Israeli forces. From March to July 2024, a maritime corridor for aid was sporadically open between Cyprus and Gaza, used by barges in Operation Safeena and by the US military.

In March 2025, Israeli imposed a three-month total blockade of supplies to the Gaza Strip. During this blockade, a flotilla in May was attacked by drones and others in June and July were intercepted by Israeli forces. The GSF has denounced the debated illegality of Israel's blockade of the Gaza Strip and highlighted the right of Palestinians in Gaza to control their territorial waters, calling for protection from the international community and qualifying their mission as "humanitarian, lawful, and unstoppable". Some Israeli legal experts, such as Yuval Shany, a professor of international law at the Hebrew University of Jerusalem, are of the opinion that the blockade is "militarily justified" due to the armed conflict between Israel and Hamas. However, other groups (including the International Committee of the Red Cross) have qualified the measure as "collective punishment", which would constitute a violation of the Hague Conventions and the Fourth Geneva Convention. Former UN High Commissioner for Human Rights Navi Pillay, the World Health Organization, UNICEF, Amnesty International, Oxfam, an independent fact-finding mission of the OHCHR and multiple UN Special Rapporteurs on the occupied Palestinian territories have also referred to the blockade as illegal according to international humanitarian law.

== Formation ==
GSF emerged in July 2025, amid the Gaza genocide, through the consolidation of multiple activist and humanitarian movements—namely the Freedom Flotilla Coalition, the Global Movement to Gaza, the Maghreb Sumud Flotilla and Sumud Nusantara—into a coordinated maritime effort. In early September, Emergency joined the flotilla with a vessel for medical assistance.

=== Participants ===
The flotilla is said to be the largest civilian-led maritime convoy in history, comprising over 50 vessels of varying sizes departing from multiple ports around the Mediterranean, and converging on Gaza. Organizers have gathered involvement from activists, doctors and artists representing at least 44 countries, who include Greta Thunberg, Rima Hassan, Thiago Ávila, Yasemin Acar (notably participants in the June 2025 Gaza Freedom Flotilla), Ada Colau, Robert Martin, Tony La Piccirella, Emma Fourreau (participants in the July flotilla), Adèle Haenel, Zwelivelile Mandela, Tadhg Hickey, Cele Fierro, Sofia Aparício and Zainal Rashid Ahmad; the initiative has received public statements of support from figures like Francesca Albanese (the UN Special Rapporteur on the occupied Palestinian territories), Mark Ruffalo, Abby Martin, Rahma Zein, Bob Vylan, Zerocalcare, Alessandro Barbero, Fiorella Mannoia, Anna Foglietta, Alessandro Gassmann, Elisa, Isabella Ferrari, Nina Zilli, Luis Tosar, Carlos Bardem, Victoria Luengo, Roger Waters, Susan Sarandon, Gustaf Skarsgård, Liam Cunningham and many others around the world. (Note: Attributed to multiple sources:)

The steering committee is composed of Ávila, Acar, Kleoniki Alexopoulou, Melanie Schweizer, Karen Moynihan, Maria Elena Delia, Saif Abu Keshek, Nadir Al-Nuri, Marouan Ben Guettaia, Wael Nawar, Hayfa Mansouri and Torkia Chaibi. Thunberg, originally part of the committee, stepped down in mid-September. The movement's spokespersons are Ávila, Abukeshek and Jeweher Chenna.

== Preparations and departures ==
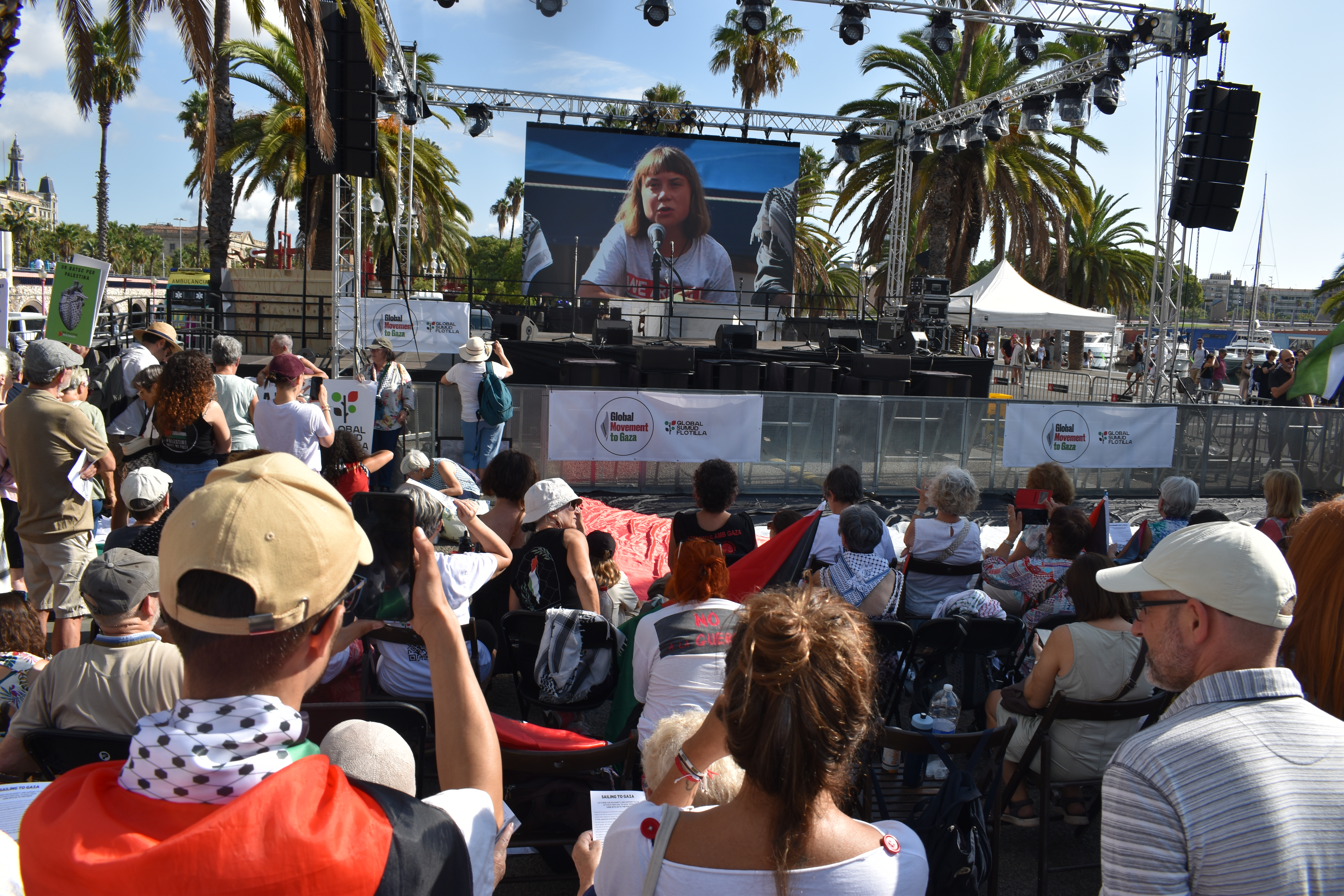
Greta Thunberg addressing supporters ahead of the departure of the Barcelona convoy

The flotilla set sail between August and September 2025, with convoys departing from Genoa on 30 August, from Barcelona on 31 August, and from Tunis and Catania on 7 September (originally planned for 4 September); their arrival was estimated for mid-September. Preparatory actions included registration of over 15,000 participants, along with training sessions, solidarity events, and camps near departure points. This resulted in the participation of more than 500 people and 40 vessels. The Italian cargo consists of 45 tons of aid.

Malaysian vessels, under the name "Sumud Nusantara Asian Flotilla", also departed with food and aid on 23 August 2025. Alongside the Nusantara and "Watermelon Flotilla", officially sponsored by the government of Malaysia, an Indian delegation was supposed to join from Kolkata, but withdrew due to safety concerns.

The Genoa vessels, four in total, were saluted during their departure by a crowd of 40,000 citizens. A union official said action would be taken in the event of an incident; this would include coordinated action from dockworkers across Europe to block all civilian shipments to Israel.

On 11 September, a group of Egyptian activists expressed their will to join the flotilla, and thus sent an official request to the Egyptian government to allow their participation, which otherwise would be cancelled. They described their first boat as "fully-equipped" and said its crew was prepared. The convoy, which was supposed to depart on 28 September, did not do so, with the Egyptian delegation confirming they were still awaiting an approval from the government. On 30 September, whilst the Egyptian delegation was sorting donations in their headquarters in Dokki, Giza, two members of the preparatory committee reportedly left the headquarters to buy coffee and on their way there were arrested by the Egyptian National Police. Another participant was also later arrested.

== Early convoy voyages ==
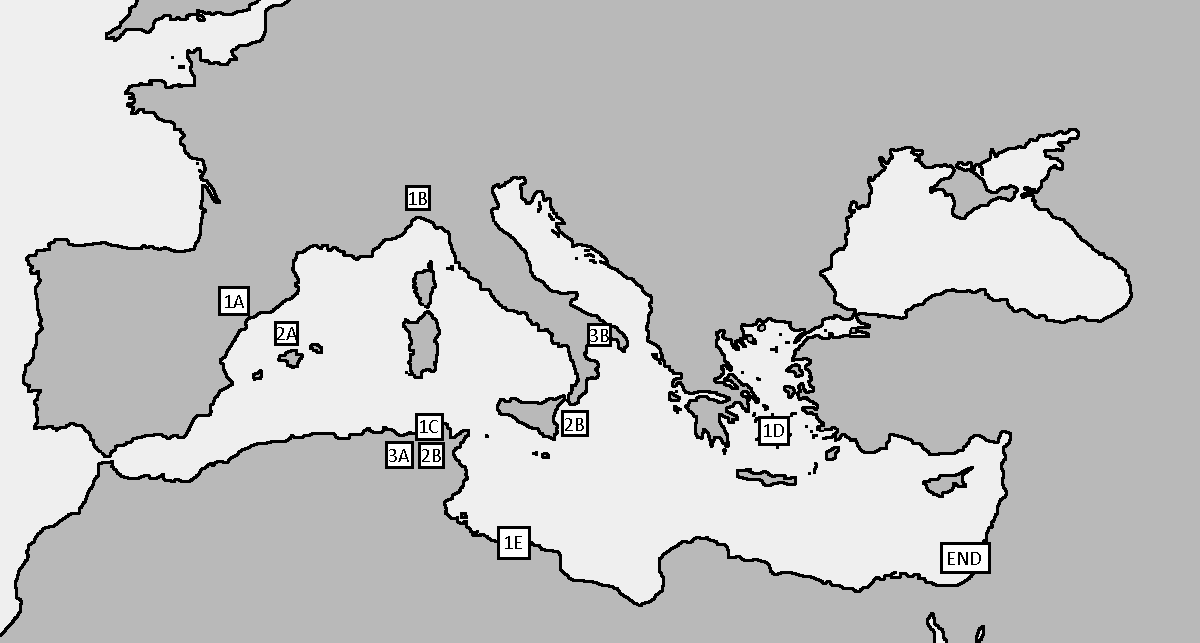
Map of the voyage and stops of the various convoys. A: Spanish convoy; B: Italian convoys; C: Tunisian convoy; D: Greek convoy; E: Libyan convoy; END: destination, Gaza Strip.

=== Spanish ===
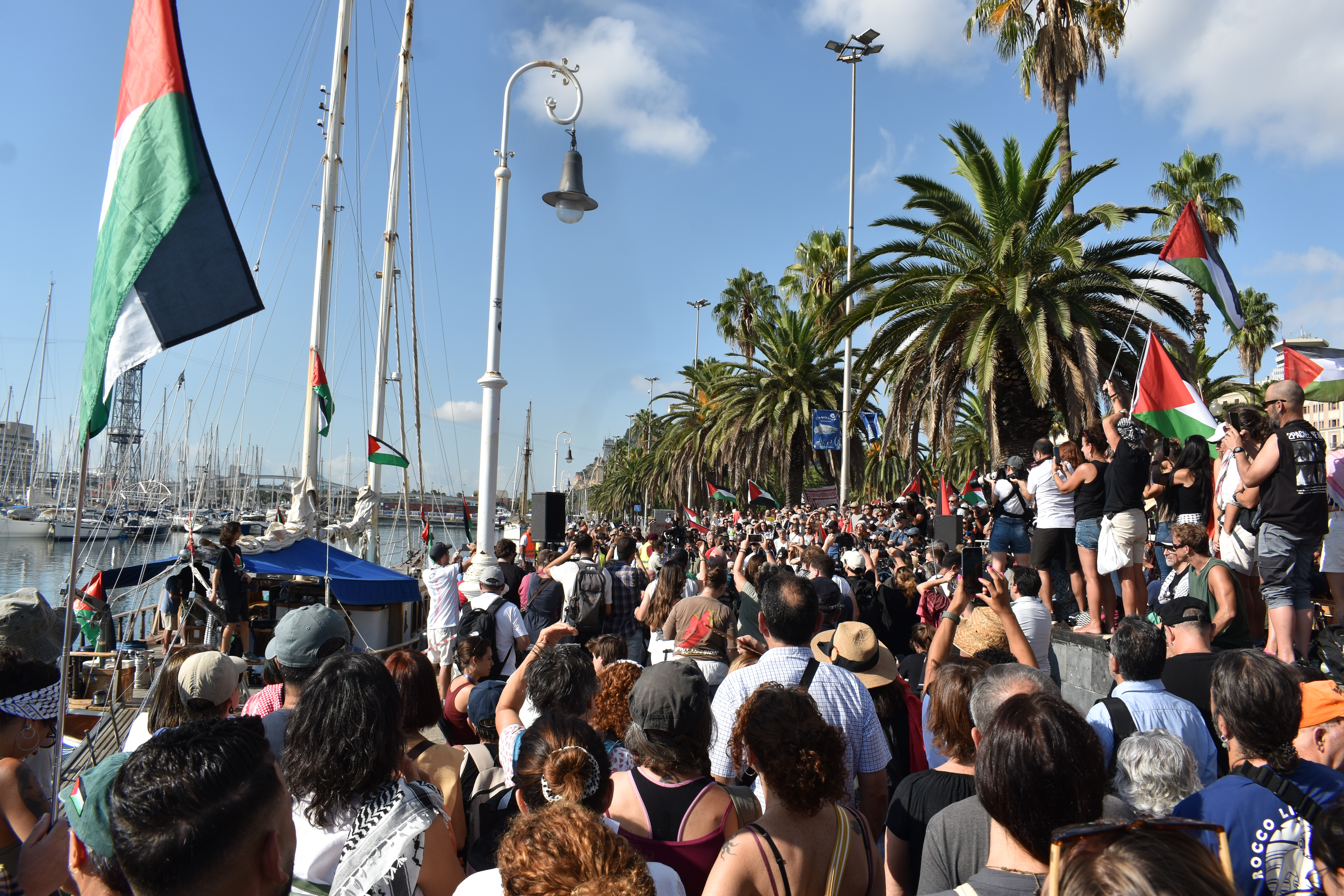
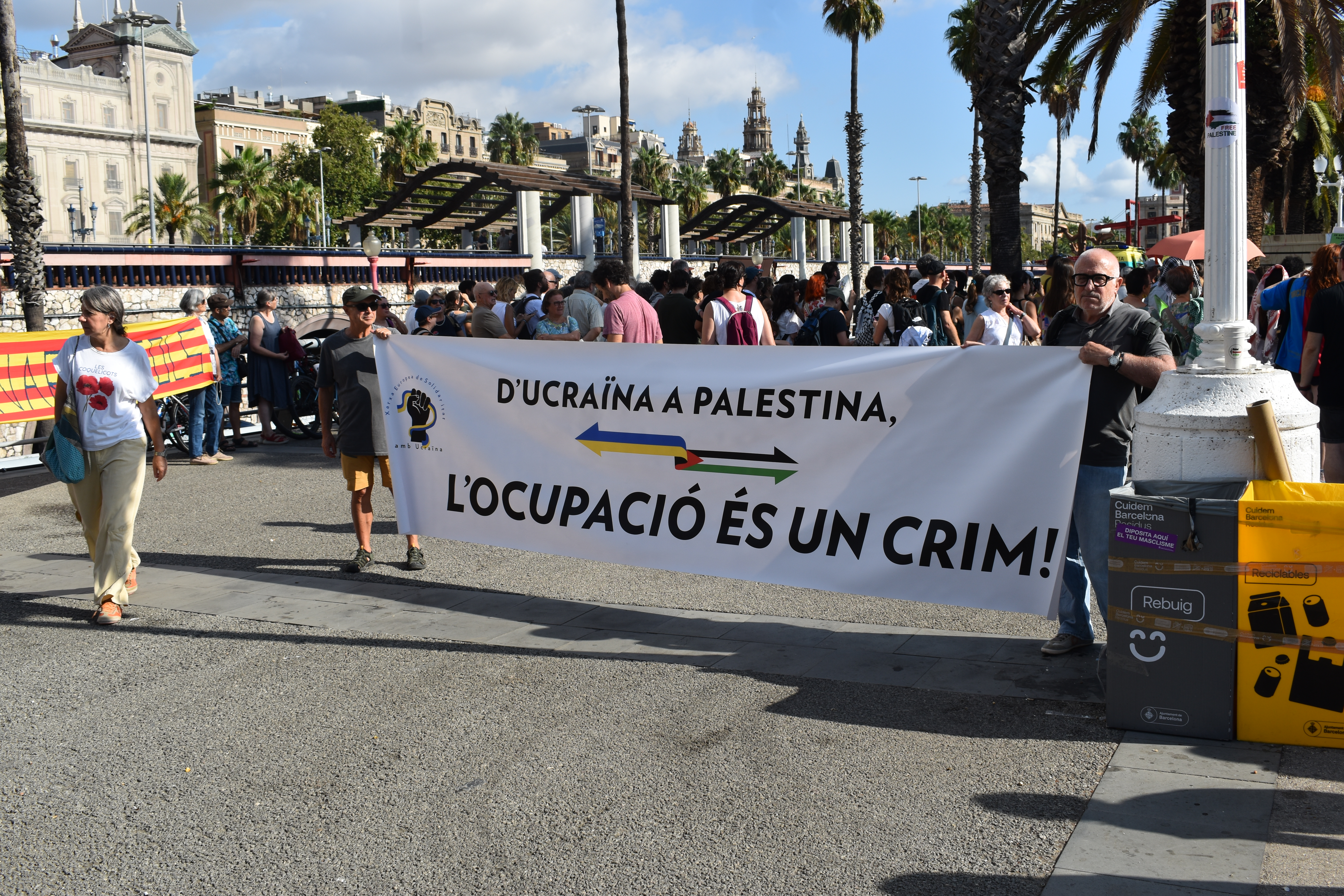
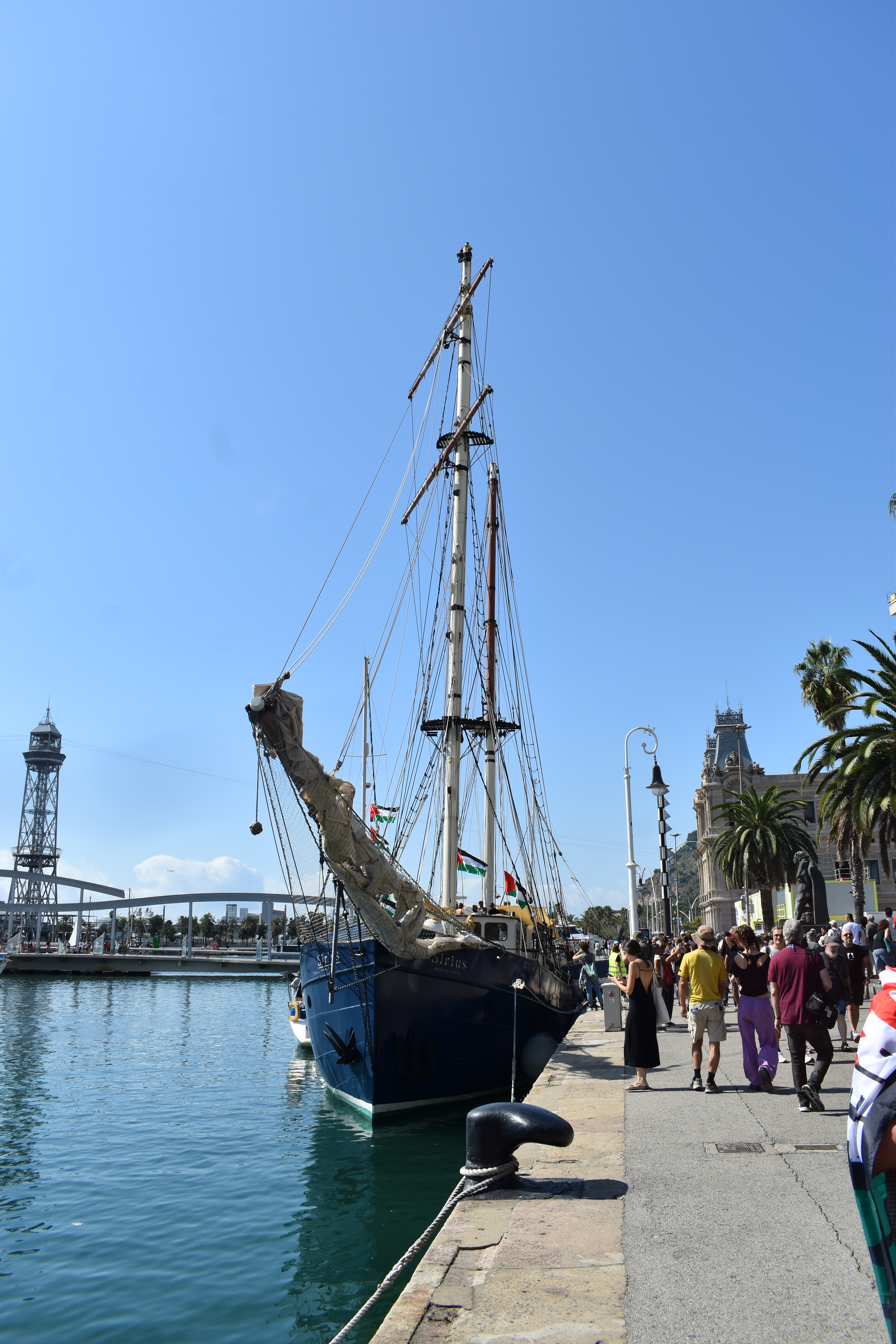
Global Sumud Flotilla setting sail from Barcelona on 31 August 2025

The Spanish convoy, notably carrying Thunberg, had to temporarily return to its port after its initial departure due to bad weather conditions, including winds around 56 km/h (35 mph). The vessels were able to set sail again in the evening of 1 September. Within its first night, the convoy, for the most part, had made it past 926 km (575 mi) from Barcelona.

Within one day of departure, members aboard the flotilla were already reporting unidentified drones following them in international waters. Some of the boats made a technical stop in Menorca and Mallorca in the morning of 3 September to repair mechanical issues, whilst up to five vessels once again returned to Barcelona due to unfavourable weather conditions. On the same date, two vessels were reported still in the Barcelona harbor, never having left the harbor in the first place for mechanical issues similar to the vessels that had stopped in Menorca and Mallorca. During the first nights, many participants of the Spanish convoy reported experiencing seasickness and vomiting, and that the vessels had endured water leaks, electrical problems and further mechanical issues.

Steering committee member Thiago Ávila announced that, during the night of 4 and 5 September, the Spanish convoy would divide in two groups: one would continue to head towards Tunis, whilst the other would wait in Menorca for those ships still docked in Barcelona, in order to prevent any ship from being left alone at sea for security reasons. On 7 September, part of the convoy arrived at the port of Sidi Bou Said in northern Tunisia to large crowds of supporters.

During the convoy's voyage, a pro-Israeli Spanish national, Jordi Ventura, followed the flotilla while playing Israeli and Jewish music off the coast of Menorca.

Vessels of the Spanish convoy
Boat	MMSI
Alma	232063368
Estrella y Manuel	224083520
Adara	225989745
Mikeno	227895860
Jeannot III	225998877
Ohwayla	235077272
Inana	232002988
Familia Madeira	255915808
Sirius	225998514
Peluxo	224144650
All In	228128870
Catalina	232042362
Spectre	224112480
Adagio 4 Felicita	225968720
Yulara	235063103
Longhaul	—N/a
La Pinya	—N/a
Isobella	—N/a
Huga	—N/a
Marinette	—N/a
Oyster Lady	—N/a
Hio	—N/a

=== Italian ===
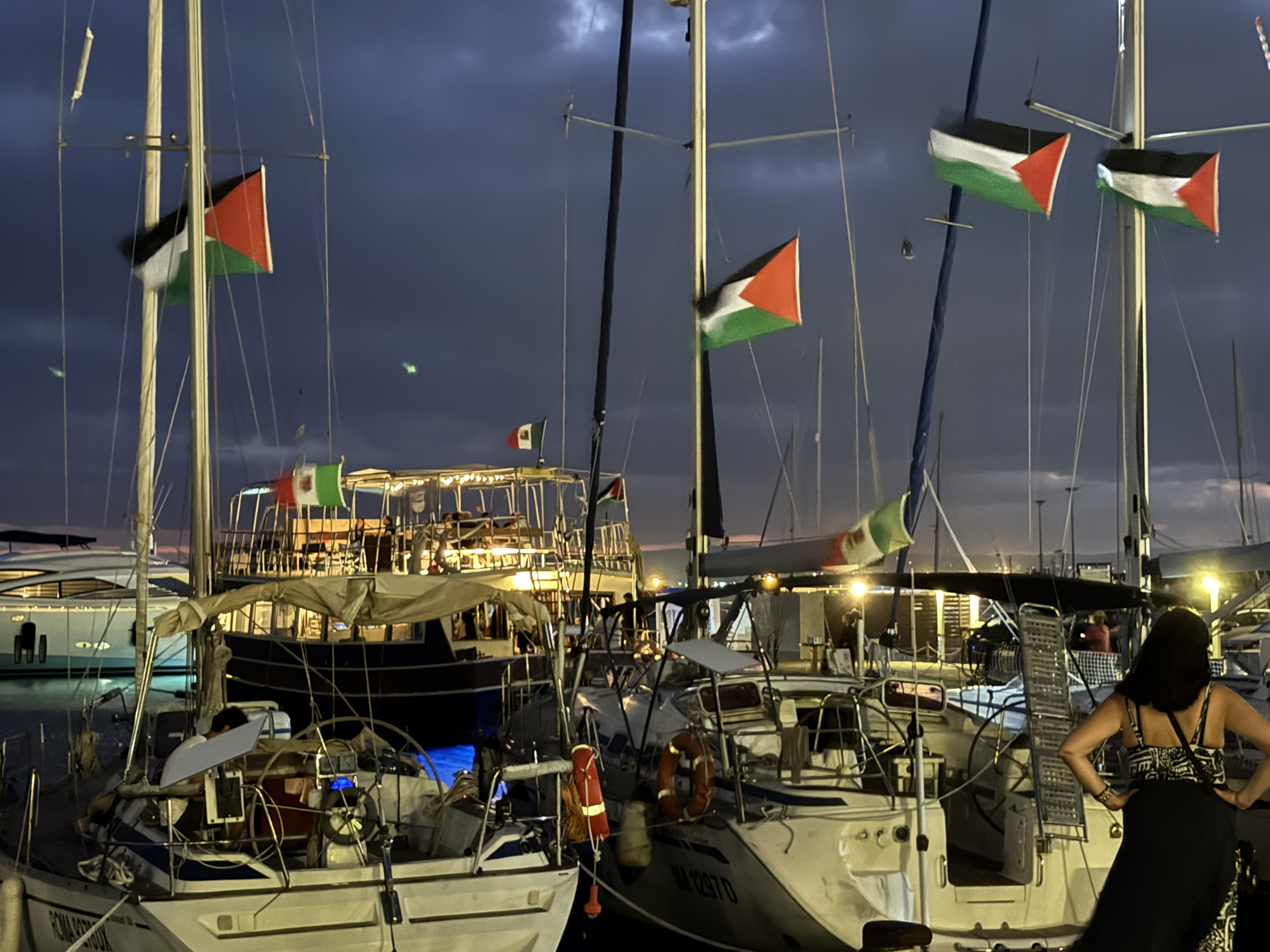
Global Sumud Flotilla in Syracuse

==== Ligurian convoy ====
By 1 September 2025, the Italian convoy from Genoa that had departed on 30 August was heading smoothly towards its immediate destination, Catania, where the second Italian convoy would embark, having met no difficulties in its navigation effort. In the meantime, the Italian-based humanitarian NGO Emergency officially announced that it would be joining the initiative in Catania, sending its vessel Life Support, equipped for search and rescue (SAR) operations and medical assistance.

The first three ships of the Genoese convoy to reach the proximity of Sicily were spotted and welcomed in the city of Syracuse on 3 September, awaiting for the departure of the Catania convoy, which was initially planned to depart on 4 September, but was later delayed by three days and further delayed to a week later.

==== Sicilian convoy ====
On 8 September, one day after the initial delay, and two days before the "final delay", the first boats from Catania started their journey, including the ones of the Flotilla's legal team.

On 13 September 18 boats sailed from Augusta to rendezvous with the other convoys later, at sea.

Around ten additional vessels set sail on 27 September from San Giovanni li Cuti in Catania. Passengers aboard these ships count among them elected officials from the European Parliament and various countries including the United States, Spain, France, Ireland and Belgium.

==== Apulian convoy ====
The following extra vessels (mostly sailing from Italy) were added to the vessel list for the convoy whilst one part of the convoy was in Tunisia (a further change is that Adagio 4 Felicita is no longer listed):

An initiative from Otranto organized by Freedom Flotilla Italia and local parish was planned, with the departure of ships to Gaza scheduled for 24 September. Alongside them, another convoy from Catania was scheduled soon after to depart on the same date.

After an initial delay due to adverse weather conditions, on 25 September, the ships from the Apulian convoy departed, numbering two.

The last ship to depart from the port of Otranto associated with the Flotilla was the Conscience, on 30 September.

Vessels of the Italian convoy (as of 14 September 2025)
Boat	MMSI
Grande Blu	
Aurora	247389870
Fair Lady	
Paola I	
Morgana	
Mango	
Luna Bark	
Maria Cristina	
Karma	
Taigete	
Wahoo	
Snap	
Selvaggia	
Ghea	
Otaria	
Zefiro	261004176
Seulle	268227000
MiaMia	

=== Tunisian ===
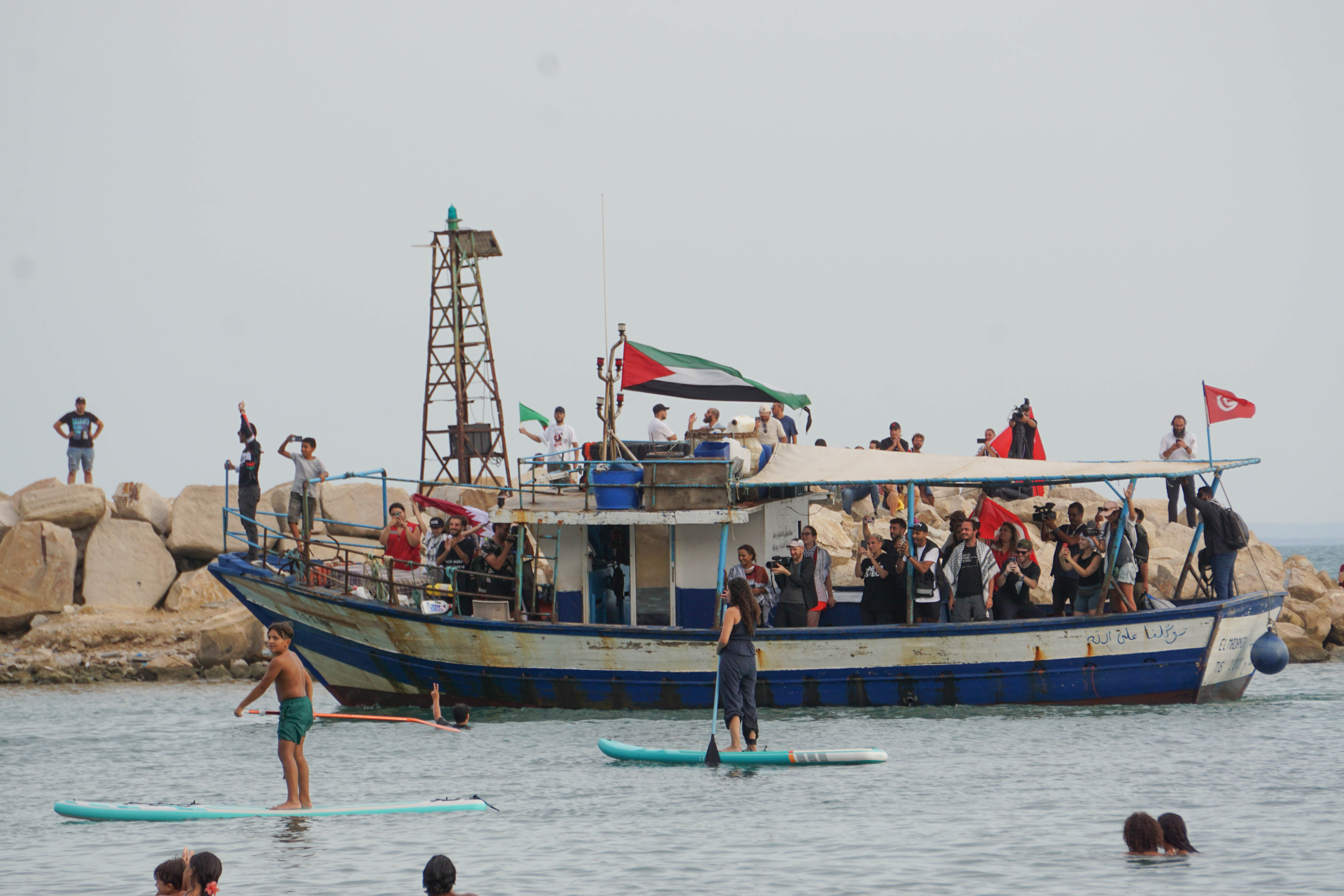
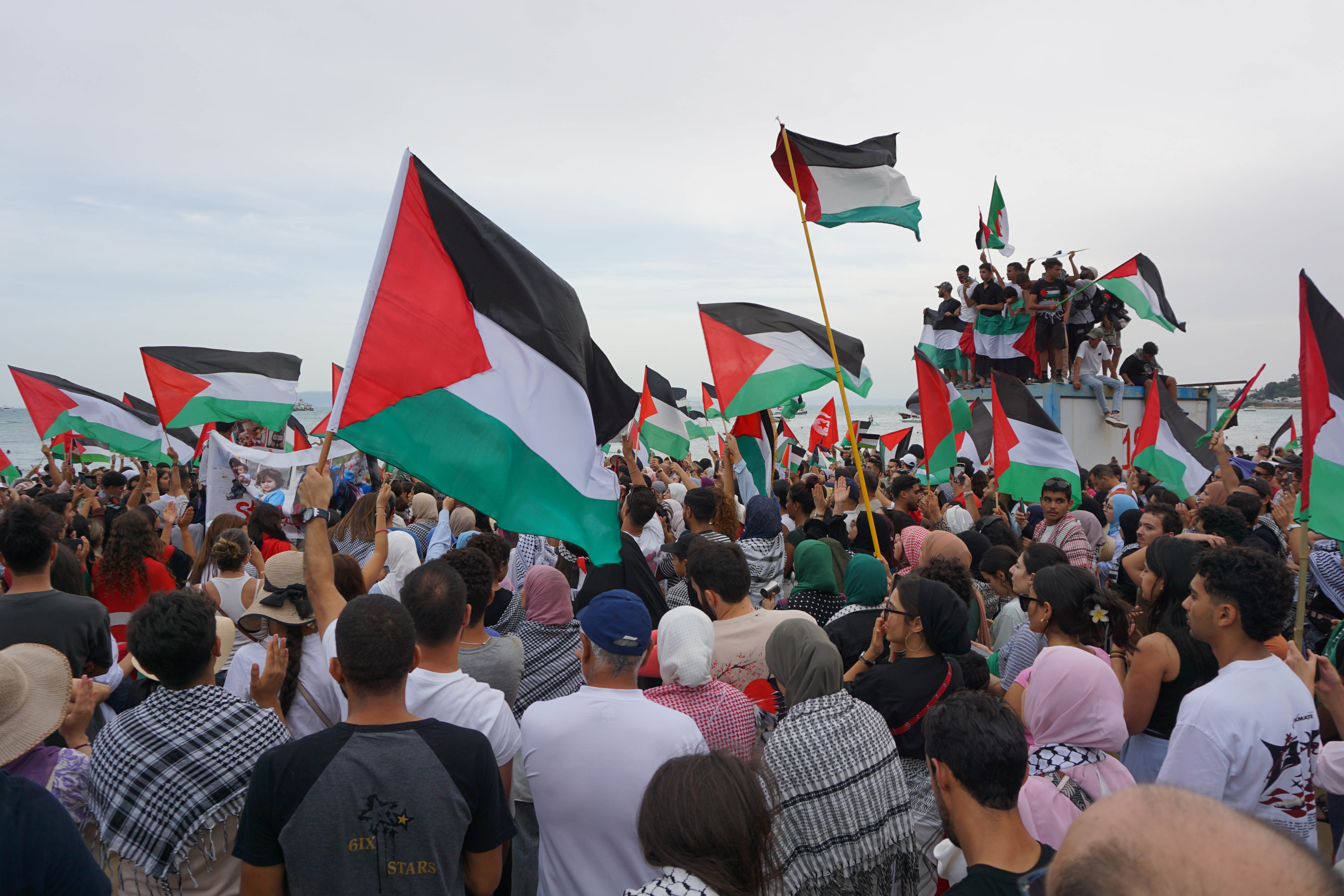
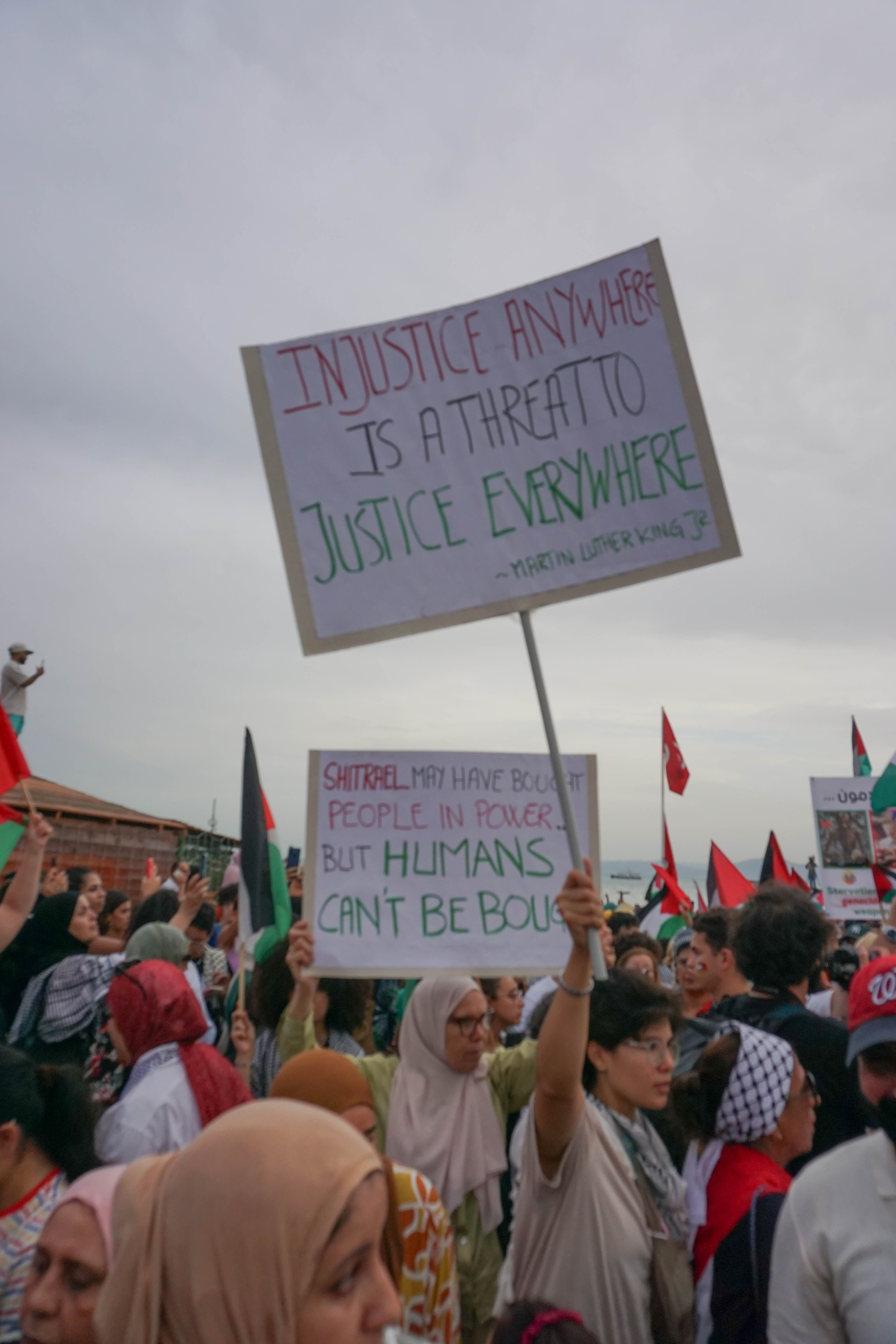
Hundreds of Tunisians gathered in Sidi Bou Said near Tunis to welcome the Global Sumud Flotilla

On 3 September 2025, the first Tunisian vessels from the southern ports of Djerba and Zarzis started to relocate to the port of Tunis, in order to start their voyage towards Gaza alongside the rest of the Tunisian convoy, with departure dates postponed soon after. On 8 and 9 September, the lead flotilla ship Family and the Alma were struck by an incendiary device suspected to be a drone attack that caused a small fire. Despite these attacks, organisers affirmed that the convoy to Gaza would continue, while refraining from confirming a date. According to sources interviewed by CBS, the drone attacks were approved by Benjamin Netanyahu. CBS stated that the use of incendiary weapons against civilians was prohibited under international humanitarian law. Two days later, the convoy moved to the larger and better-equipped port of Bizerte ahead of its final planned departure. On 12 September, the intended departure date was set for the following day.

Vessels of the Tunisian convoy
Boat	MMSI
Mia Mia	
Mijita	
Soltana	
Allakatalla	
Meteque	
Alaeddine	
Florida	
1x	
Mawwal Libya	
Tiko	
Yamen	
Kamar	

=== Greek ===
A departure from Syros was initially supposed to occur on 8 September, but it was reportedly delayed to 11 September at first, and afterwards to an unspecified later date. Ultimately the ships departed from Syros on 14 September.

Vessels of the Greek convoy
Boat	MMSI
Oxygen (sometimes Oxygono)	
Ilektra	
Ahed Tamimi	
Pavlos Fyssas	
Vangelis Pissias	
Mohammad Bhar	
Free Willy	
Capten Nikos	237944100

=== Algerian ===
An Algerian convoy of four ships took part in the Global Sumud Flotilla.

Vessels of the Algerian convoy
Boat	MMSI
Deir Yassine (Mali)	
Amsterdam	
Essia	
Tika Bab El Maghariba	

=== Libyan ===
Ships from Libya, including the Omar Al-Mukhtar ship (named after the Libyan anticolonial hero and revolutionary Omar al-Mukhtar) also declared that they would join the rest of the flotilla carrying Libyan, US, Canadian and British nationals from the port of Tripoli.

Vessels of the Libyan convoy
Boat	MMSI
Omar Al-Mukhtar	

== Merging of the convoys ==
=== Arrival in Italy ===
On 17 September, the 24 vessels from the combined Spanish and Tunisian convoys approached the southern tip of Sicily, where 17 more boats in the Italian fleet were waiting at Portopalo di Capo Passero. When stationed in Portopalo, local sailors and citizens helped the flotilla with its maintenance. On the morning of 19 September, the convoy departed heading towards Greece, while a further six vessels in the Greek convoy were underway from Syros towards a rendezvous point further east, before also stopping in Adamantas, Milos. The following day and upon departure from Portopalo di Capo Passero, a boat of the flotilla experienced significant mechanical issues 20 nautical miles (37 km) away from the coast.

On the night of 21 September, during their voyage towards Greek waters, the Flotilla spotted three drones in the proximity of the Flotilla. A message to the families of the participants was sent reassuring them of their safety soon after. The next day, the Greek convoy departed from Milos and started to head towards Crete, which the rest of the flotilla had started to approach, stating that they intend to arrive in Gaza on 29 September. One drone was spotted following the Flotilla during the day. As the boats approached Crete, first reports of internal strife in the flotilla started to surface. Il Fatto Quotidiano reported that the Maghreb Sumud Flotilla portion of the convoy openly protested numerous times the presence of LGBTQ+ people on the boats.

=== Arrival in Greece ===
On 23 September, the first boats from the Greek convoy reached the shores of Crete. Later that night, around 15 drones circled low above the Alma ship for several hours in an interval of every 10 minutes. The following night, numerous ships including Zefiro were damaged by drones.

In the morning of 24 September, the Greek part of the convoy docked in Xerokampos. At 13:00, the Italian NGO Emergency, which had joined the Flotilla back in Catania, photographed an Israeli Lockheed C-130H Hercules flying low in the proximity of the Flotilla, raising several suspicions. The plane, marked with the number "435", was reportedly the same that was used in the Entebbe raid in 1976. The communications of the Flotilla were repeatedly sabotaged through the use of ABBA music, played at a very loud volume, in several ships.

During the night between 24 and 25 September, the Flotilla warned its participants that it had received a notice from some unnamed governments of an imminent Israeli attack. It was reported that during the night there was "moderate drone activity". After the report, on 25 September, the Flotilla once again stated that they had reliable intel which suggested that Israel would be attacking the Flotilla in the next 48 hours with potentially lethal weaponry. On the same day, the Flotilla finally fully united with the Greek convoy.

== Attacks on vessels ==
=== Familia Madeira and Alma (8 and 9 September) ===
On the night between 8 and 9 September 2025, GSF member Yasemin Acar reported that a drone had struck the main ship of the convoy, the Portuguese Familia Madeira (known among participants as the Family Boat), ahead of its departure from Tunis, briefly setting it on fire. The vessel reportedly carried the members who had taken part in the June mission, including Acar herself, Thunberg and Ávila. The attack happened after Portuguese lawmaker Mariana Mortágua had been on board the previous night and GSF activists believe the attack was timed to wait until the elected official had left.

Shortly after, members of the flotilla posted a video from security cameras showing a vessel being set ablaze by something falling from above. CNN described the video as depicting "an incendiary object fall from the sky", that exploded upon impact. El País reported that, according to an investigation, "the drone launched a projectile, igniting the flames, which were extinguished minutes later". France24 reported "an improvised incendiary dropped from a commercial or retail drone", was the likely outcome based on expert and video analysis. Bellingcat declared that the object "must have been deployed from an aerial platform" and that background sound analysis appeared to be "consistent with that of a drone". Armament Research Services director described the sound in videos as "a flying object such as a UAV or light aircraft", but that it remained inconclusive.

The night after the fire on the Familia Madeira, a drone attack on another GSF vessel in Sidi Bou Said, the British-flagged Alma, was reported by the crew. No one was injured. Organizers described an incendiary device dropped onto vessel similar to the previous attack. A video of the incident was again authenticated by BBC Verify; a weapons expert described the recovered device as "clearly some kind of grenade ... most likely delivered by drone" and as "common but not exclusive to some models of Israeli hand grenades". Bellingcat reported the likelihood of "improvised incendiary munitions" being used in both attacks, based on expert opinion from analysis of videos and images, with the devices recovered appearing the same.

On 3 October 2025, CBS News, citing two American intelligence officials brief on the matter, reported that the two attacks had been directly ordered by Israeli prime minister Benjamin Netanyahu and carried out via incendiary devices dropped by drones launched from a submarine. Use of incendiary devices against civilians and civilian objects is disallowed under international humanitarian law and the rules of war.

=== Multiple vessels struck (23 and 24 September) ===
On the night of 23 and 24 September, the Zefiro boat, approaching Crete, was struck by drones and damaged. This came after the participants heard significant explosions during the night. Soon after, a German activist on board, Yasemin Acar, reported that at least 5 vessels were struck in a very short period of time. It was later stated that up to 11 ships were hit, notably including those carrying Italian politicians from the Five Star Movement (M5S) and Greens and Left Alliance (AVS). GSF crew sighted 15–16 drones, the same number sighted the prior day in the morning. Aside from Italian ships, Polish and English ships were also hit. Unlike previous incidents, members of the flotilla reported that strikes on 24 September included the use of sound bombs and sting substances. According to Al Jazeera, the incident would be "in keeping with many of [Israel's] suspected overseas operations".

=== Response to the attacks ===
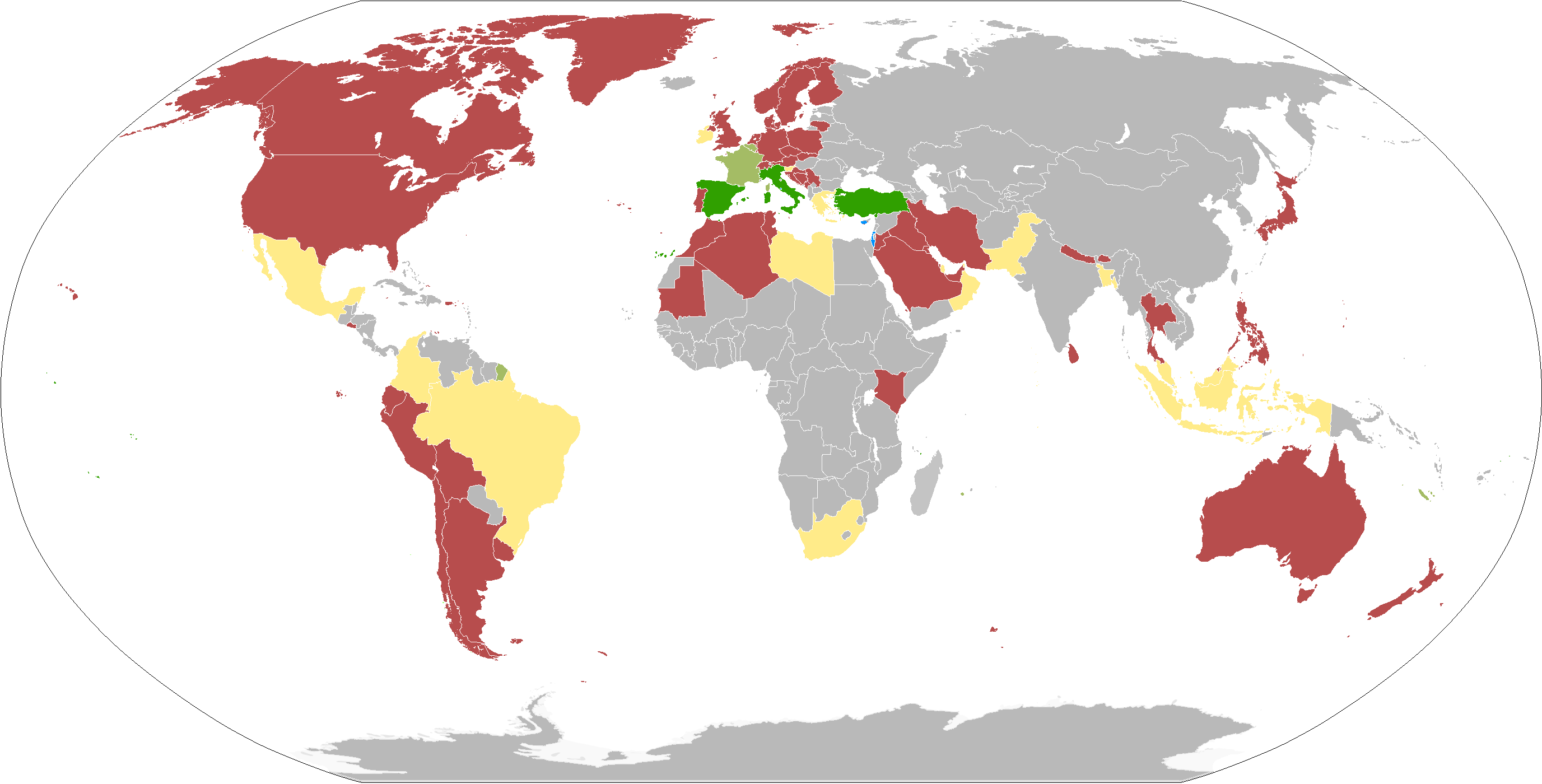
Nations that directly assisted the flotilla to guarantee the safety of their citizens Nations that relied on the direct actions of other nations or entities as to guarantee their citizens' safety on the Flotilla Nations that officially stated there would be some protection, or in case of significant attacks on their citizens, accountability Nations that offered no safety guarantees for their citizens on board Nations that offered an alternative port to Gaza (within and outside their border) in exchange of security guarantees Nations that have none of their citizens on board

==== Familia Madeira and Alma ====
In response to the Familia Madeira attack, the Tunisian National Guard said it had not detected any drones in the area and that the fire started amongst the life jackets on board the ship, suggesting that a cigarette could have been responsible for the fire. Expert analysis reported by BBC Verify stated that the video "casts serious doubt on the Tunisian authorities' version of events". GSF subsequently called for the evacuation of flotilla ships, however some participants and volunteers decided to remain in order to protect the vessels. According to organisers, the Portuguese ship sustained damage to the main deck as well as the lower-deck. A GSF spokesperson held Israel responsible for the incident, and the UN Special Rapporteur on the occupied Palestinian territories, Francesca Albanese, who was herself in Tunis to salute the convoy, speculated that Israel could be responsible, declaring that, "If confirmed, it is an attack against Tunisian sovereignty." Soon after, various sources questioned where the drones originally departed from for the Familia Madeira and Alma attacks in Tunisia, with suggestions including Malta, Greece (namely Crete) or Italy (specifically from Sigonella, where in the previous days Israeli planes had made a landing).

On 11 September, Italian Foreign Minister Antonio Tajani called on Israel to "respect the rights of its citizens involved," reporting to parliament that the flotilla would be monitored, while providing diplomatic support to the 57 Italian citizens participating in the flotilla. The Unione Sindacale di Base (USB) of Italy stated that, in response to both the Alma and Familia Madeira attacks, it would declare a general strike on 22 September, blocking ports, highways, and stations in co-operation with the Autonomous Collective of Port Workers of Genoa. Soon after the strikes and the protests occurred successfully, involving over 70 Italian cities, the Flotilla thanked Italian strikers and protesters for their support through a statement by Yassine Lafram, the president of the Union of Islamic Communities and Organisations in Italy.

==== Further strikes and naval vessels dispatched ====
After the attacks on the Flotilla on 24 September, Francesca Albanese called for immediate international protection to be declared. Matteo Salvini instead stated that despite there is a need to "protect everyone," it is clear that there "are inherent dangers in getting closer to a war zone." Guido Crosetto, the Italian Italian minister of defence, stated that he would personally send one frigate of the Italian Navy, the Virginio Fasan, which was already near the location of the incident, in northern Crete, to offer any kind of assistance to the Flotilla, later replacing the ship with another frigate, the Alpino, for the same purpose. Crosetto requested that the flotilla remain in international waters, rather than attempt to break the Israeli blockade, suggesting an alternative proposal to provide aid to Gaza. Spanish Prime Minister Pedro Sánchez announced that his country would dispatch a naval vessel, the Furor, to assist the Flotilla, similarly to Italy. The ships are intended to act as support in case of a rescue mission, according to Sánchez. Based on maritime law, the naval vessels deployed are restricted to supporting the flotilla in international waters. The flotilla otherwise remains protected under the UN Convention on the Law of the Sea in territorial waters if deemed non-threatening.

The CGIL announced an immediate protest in Piazza di Monte Citorio in Rome (where the Chamber of Deputies is located) and suggested a general strike similar to the one on 22 September might take place in the future, which was later confirmed by the USB, scheduled as early as 26 September. In Greece, the New Left party condemned the government's complicity in allowing the convoy to be hit in the Greek search and rescue area and thus through its inaction, violating its own international obligations. In France, Mathilde Panot called Macron to protect the French participants on board, and the General Confederation of Labour of France called an immediate protest in Place du Capitole in Toulouse. Hundreds of people protested on 25 September in Tunis. Around 20 people protested against the attacks on the flotilla in Vilnius on 26 September in front of the Ministry of Foreign Affairs.

== Reactions during the voyage ==
=== International ===
In Italy, among the people gathered in Genoa on the flotilla's departure was mayor Silvia Salis, who drew ties between Gaza and Genoa as a city decorated for its resistance during World War II. Other politicians voiced their support for the initiative, including former prime minister Giuseppe Conte, who stated that the initiative was an "extraordinary reaction from 'below' to international indifference" on the topic. Italian organizations such as Giustizia Insieme, ANPI, CGIL and FLAI, as well as political parties like the Five Star Movement (M5S), the Communist Refoundation Party (PRC) and Possibile, supported the initiative. Politicians who sailed on the flotilla include M5S senator Marco Croatti, Greens and Left Alliance (AVS) MEP Benedetta Scuderi, PD deputy Arturo Scotto, and PD MEP Annalisa Corrado.

On 3 September 2025, upon reports that an Israeli KC-130H military plane had made a round trip from Nevatim Airbase to Naval Air Station Sigonella, Sicily, AVS deputy and Green Europe spokesperson Angelo Bonelli requested that the government clarify whether the aircraft was "spying the Global Sumud Flotilla [...] or loading war material." The Italian Army Staff replied that it was a "technical landing" for "logistical support" from the US Army, "in full compliance with national laws and international agreements." The next day, questioned by opposition leader Elly Schlein, Italian Prime Minister Giorgia Meloni confirmed that, like Spain, Italy would guarantee the safety of the flotilla's Italian participants; however, she discouraged Italians from taking part in the initiative, suggesting they use "safer and already existing means" to send humanitarian aid to Gaza and labelling the flotilla as "unnecessarily dangerous". Her reaction was met with criticism from some of the Italian participants, who highlighted the death hazard posed by the airdrops used by the Italian government that far.

In Spain, former mayor of Barcelona Ada Colau expressed her support for the initiative and chose to also embark, whilst another Spanish politician and MEP, Jaume Asens, stated he planned to be aboard one of the ships but only for a "few miles", stating his support for the cause. Spanish foreign minister José Manuel Albares stated that Spain would deploy "all necessary protection" so as to secure the safety of all Spanish participants and politicians on board if needed.

Portuguese representation included Mariana Mortágua, activist Miguel Duarte and the actress Sofia Aparício. Mortágua expected her parliamentary immunity to provide legal protection; however, Portuguese foreign minister Paulo Rangel said that she would not have diplomatic immunity and Portugal would not provide protection to the flotilla under international law, apart from consular protection.

In France, the Association France Palestine Solidarité published a "call for arms" as towards French citizens to join the flotilla's voyage.

In South Africa, public support has been observed, including the participation of some individuals such as local members of Jews for a Free Palestine.

President of Colombia Gustavo Petro issued an official statement of support and solidarity with the flotilla upon its departure.

An EU Commission spokesperson commented that they did not stand with the flotilla as they believed such initiatives could "worsen the situation," suggesting, like Giorgia Meloni, that it would be best to use "pre-existing humanitarian means".

On 16 September, foreign ministers of 16 countries that represent flotilla participants released a joint statement expressing security concerns, and declared that "any violation of international law and human rights of the participants in the Flotilla, including attacks against the vessels in international waters or illegal detention, will lead to accountability."

On 25 September, the Greek foreign minister, Giorgos Gerapetritis, assured the safety of the flotilla in Greek waters and noted that Israel had been notified that Greek citizens were participating in the flotilla.

On 27 September, Mosab Hassan Yousef, son of Hamas co-founder Hassan Yousef who acted as a double agent for the Shin Bet security agency, suggested that Israelis should create a "counter-flotilla" as a sign of protest against the Sumud Flotilla and to celebrate its (hinted at) "neutralization [of the Flotilla] by the Israeli Navy".

=== Israeli ===
Israeli minister of national security Itamar Ben-Gvir presented a plan of action on how to stop and react to the Global Sumud Flotilla arrival. According to him, despite the initiative's humanitarian nature, it still was to be considered a threat to "undermine Israel's sovereignty and support Hamas in Gaza." Thus, he proposed that members be sent to Ketziot and Damon prisons and treated as terrorists. The GSF issued an official response, describing Ben-Gvir's words as an act of intimidation and a smear campaign constituting "a blatant violation of international humanitarian law and the Geneva Conventions". Israel Hayom reported that among drafting plans to arrest Thunberg, the minister also intended to seize the flotilla vessels and convert them into a police fleet. On 1 September 2025, a few hours before the flotilla departed from Barcelona for its second time, the Israeli Navy conducted maritime drills in conjunction with the Gaza Division. The Times of Israel and Al Jazeera both noted that the navy troops practised "a variety of combat scenarios". This was suggested by Al Jazeera to be a training exercise for a planned assault on the flotilla, while The Times of Israel wrote that there was no evidence to connect the drill with the flotilla.

On 10 September 2025, the Israeli Ministry for Diaspora Affairs and Combating Antisemitism declared that the flotilla had ties with Hamas and the Muslim Brotherhood and was a cover-up operation to sustain "terror networks". On 22 September, Israel's foreign ministry officially stated that Israel was going to "stop the Flotilla" due to the Ministry for Diaspora Affairs and Combating Antisemitism's verdict regarding the flotilla's ties to Hamas and the Muslim Brotherhood. They also stated that if the Flotilla was "truly an humanitarian convoy" they were free to dock in the port of Ashkelon, where Israel would transfer the humanitarian aid to the Gaza Strip. On 24 September, Israel's foreign ministry, after the Flotilla's refusal to dock in Ashkelon, told the flotilla that, if the Flotilla "truly was a humanitarian convoy" and "did not trust Israel," then they were "free" to dock in any other neighbouring country. On 25 September, the Israeli Navy stated they were ready to intercept the Flotilla once it entered the "Israeli maritime borders", including with the use of elite forces such as Shayetet 13.

On 19 September 2025, a group of 200 to 250 Israeli Jews and Israeli Arabs gathered near the border of the Gaza Strip to denounce the Gaza War, the Israeli blockade and support the Sumud Flotilla. The event was organized by Radical Bloc, a local radical left organization, and a contingent of the Hadash party, based in Jaffa, Tel Aviv, which in past days had already peacefully demonstrated their support for the Flotilla.

On 26 September, Stefano Rebora, the president of the Genoese non-profit Music for Peace, denounced that the Israeli Coordinator of Government Activities in the Territories (COGAT) had imposed the removal of "biscuits, jam, honey and other highly nutritional foods" from the aid parcels they had sent, and that the Italian government and the Jordan Hashemite Charity Organization (JHCO) had complied.

Similarly to what proposed by Mosab Hassan Yousef on 27 September, Israeli influencer Natalie Dadon and Emily Damari, a woman who had previously been kidnapped by Hamas during the October 7 attacks, stated on 29 September that they were organizing a "white and blue" counter-flotilla against the Sumud Flotilla.

==== Israel's claims of Hamas's involvement ====
On 30 September, the Israeli foreign ministry said that the Israel Defense Forces (IDF) had found "in a Hamas outpost in the Gaza Strip" a 2021 letter signed by the late Hamas leader Ismail Haniyeh endorsing the Palestinian Conference for Palestinians Abroad (PCPA), as well as a document listing the names of PCPA operatives, "some of whom are high-ranking, well-known Hamas operatives."

=== Palestinian ===
The Al Mezan Center for Human Rights, based in Omar Mukhtar Street, Gaza, called for support and solidarity with the flotilla, asking the international community to guarantee the protection of the vessels and its sailors.

The Palestinian embassy in Sweden published a press release in support of the flotilla.

The Gaza Tribes Union and the Follow-Up Committee of National and Islamic Forces also praised the flotilla a few days after its departure. The Palestinian Alternative Revolutionary Path Movement issued a militant salute to port workers in Genoa and Athens for their statements in solidarity with the flotilla, and joined their threats to ignite a global workers' strike.

== Final leg to Gaza ==
From 27 September onwards it was reported that the Spanish, Italian, Greek and Turkish governments were all monitoring the Flotilla at the same time, with Turkey reportedly using drones to do so; the Turkish monitoring effort was confirmed by president Recep Tayyip Erdoğan's office. The following day, the flotilla departed on route to Gaza having waited for naval support to arrive. On 29 September, one of the vessels broke down in international waters between Crete, Cyprus and Egypt and started taking water in, due to a technical malfunction; Turkey and the NGO Emergency sent aid to evacuate the activists onto another ship.

On 30 September, it was announced that the Italian Navy would stop escorting the Flotilla at the end of the very same day once it had reached a distance of 150 nautical miles (280 km) from Gaza alongside the NGO Emergency. At the same time, the Turkish Naval Forces and the Ministry of National Defense of Turkey confirmed that they would continue to secure the Flotilla's safety "if needed". On the same day, the Spanish government also confirmed that its navy would not escort the Flotilla once it reaches a distance of 120 nautical miles (220 km) from Gaza. On 1 October, the Turkish Ministry of National Defense reported that 11 members of the Flotilla were evacuated after they requested assistance while Israeli vessels approached using "dangerous and intimidatory maneuvers".

=== Interception by Israel ===
The FFC, along with Thousand Madleens to Gaza (TMTG), announced that a vessel dedicated to media and healthcare professionals would depart on 1 October, in response to Israel's killing of journalists and medics in Gaza. On the early hours of the same day, the Flotilla was circled by an Israeli warship and various unidentified drones. The warship's reported attempts to stop the Flotilla, by intercepting and jamming the communications of Alma (which were compromised for 5 minutes), failed. Thereafter, the warship approached the Sirius, failing to intercept it too, before retreating. At around 10:20 UTC, after the flotilla reached within 120 nautical miles of Gaza, two Israeli tugboats were reportedly spotted by the Grande Blu ship.

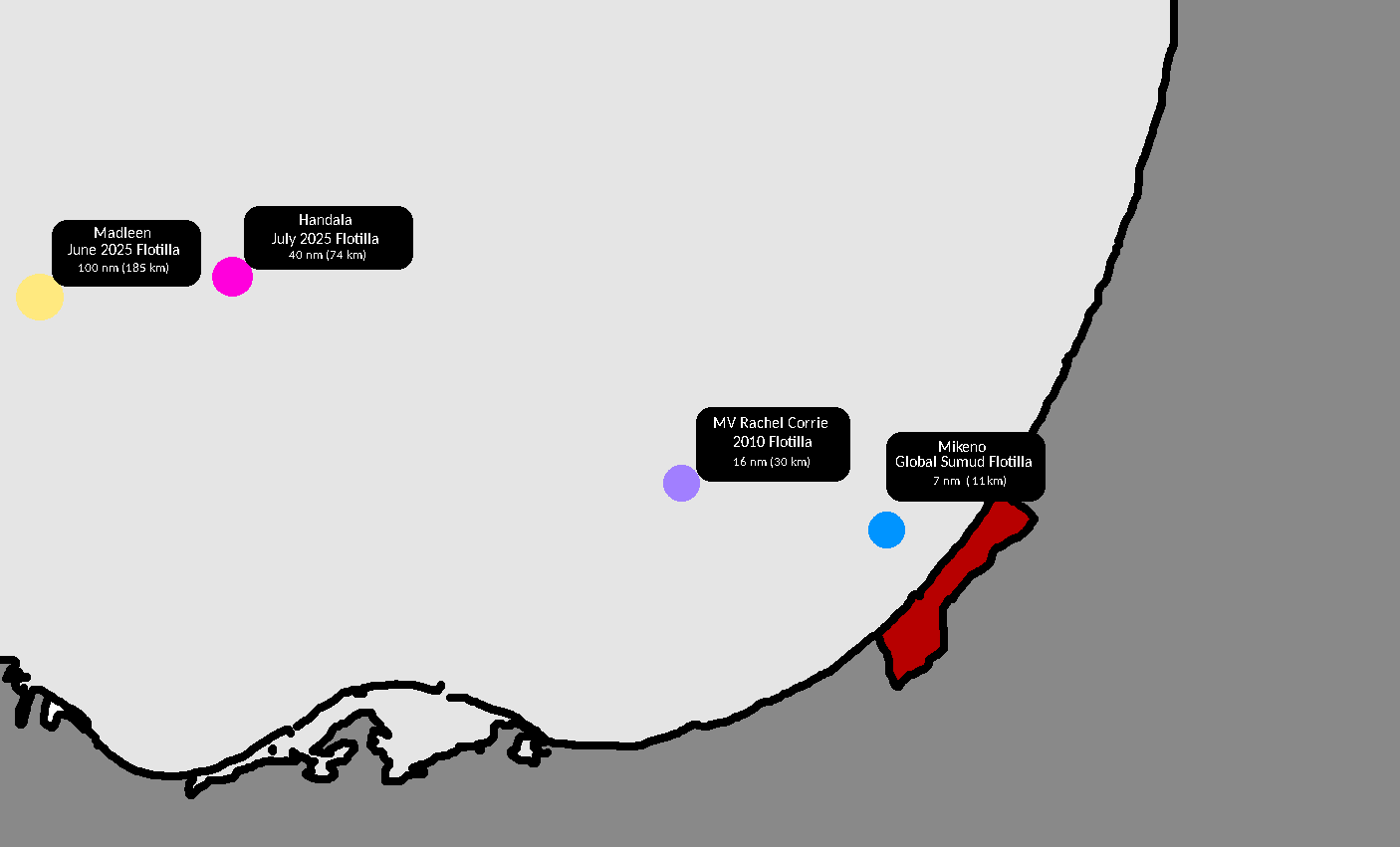
A map illustrating the locations where various vessels of the Flotillas between 2010 and 2025 were intercepted from the Israeli Navy and the IDF. (The location for Mikeno is for the last signal, not interception.)

Later that day, at around 16:00 UTC, an emergency signal was sent to the Turkish Navy, allowing 11 individuals to be evacuated at around 75 nautical miles (139 km) from Gaza. The reasons of the emergency call have not been specified. At around 16:55 UTC it was reported by Italy's Democratic Party (PD) MP Arturo Scotto and by an organizer that more than 20 unidentified ships were approaching, being located at around 5 nautical miles (9.3 km) from the Flotilla and getting closer. At around 17:00 UTC, fighter jets of the Royal Air Force (RAF) were reported to have departed from the Akrotiri and Dhekelia bases in Cyprus towards the location of the Flotilla. At 17:25 UTC, Israel sent its first signal to halt all operations to the Flotilla, and at 17:30 UTC, it was reported that the Flotilla expected to be intercepted by the Israeli Navy in the following hour. Around that time, Alma was approached by two rigid inflatable boats (RIB).

It was later confirmed at 17:45 UTC that interception had officially begun. Despite this, at around 18:00 UTC it was announced that the mission would continue and that the boats that were not intercepted would still attempt to break the blockade. Italian minister of defence Crosetto stated that the intercepted participants would be sent to the port of Ashdod. Soon after, rockets from the Gaza Strip attempted to strike the city of Ashdod, with all the rockets being intercepted. At 18:45 UTC it was reported that Israeli forces used water cannons against the Yulara ship and various explosions were also heard – at the time of the incident the Flotilla was 65 nautical miles (120 km) from Gaza; the Israelis were later reported to have used water cannons on the Meteque ship at around 21:10 UTC. Around that time, it was reported that the total number of intercepted ships of the Flotilla was six. It was reported that another three ships were stopped by the time 22:20 UTC. At around 23:00 UTC the Flotilla reported that the Israeli Navy attempted to sink one of the Flotilla's ships, namely the Maria Cristina. By 23:55 UTC 12 vessels were reported to be intercepted. By 00:40 UTC, 2 October, the vessels that were intercepted were 13. At 01:00 UTC the Flotilla stated that 30 ships were still heading towards Gaza, and that the Flotilla was roughly located around 46 nautical miles (85 km) miles from Gaza. As the morning approached by the time 05:45 UTC, 20 boats had been intercepted. By 07:10 UTC, 23 boats were still sailing towards Gaza according to its own tracker.

By 8:25 UTC only 5 vessels were still en-route: Fair Lady, Marinette, Mikeno and the legal support team heading towards Cyprus. The ship that had got the closest to Gaza, Mikeno, reached 7 nautical miles (13 km) from Gaza before communications were lost. The IDF denied that the ship ever got close to the coast. The GSF also confirmed that it had lost contact with the Mikeno hours beforehand, so pending confirmation from the crew, the tracker location within Gaza's territorial waters could be the result of human or technical error. If the Mikeno ship is confirmed to have reached 7 nautical miles from Gaza, the GSF would be the flotilla that has come the closest to the Gaza coast since the implementation of the Israeli blockade. Travelling at a speed of 7 knots, the ship would have reached Gaza within an hour.

By 12:00 UTC, the GSF confirmed they had lost all contacts with all the ships in the mission aside from the Marinette, which was still sailing. The ship had been forced by weather conditions to return to Barcelona earlier in the voyage and had been sailing separately from the rest of the ships that had already been intercepted. On 3 October, at around 07:00 UTC the Marinette was intercepted.

After the first boats were seized, the Israeli Foreign Ministry said that no humanitarian supplies had been found on board, and presented a video showing the empty interior of one of them as evidence. GFS organizers described the claims as "another entry in a long record of lies" and a "systematic smear campaign being waged against the flotilla". They cited videos and images taken during their journey as evidence to the contrary, and in turn called Israel out for "weaponizing hunger, blocking aid, bombing food distribution centers, and condemning families to death by starvation," accusing media outlets of shielding the Israeli narrative.

=== Response to the interception ===
==== Worldwide protests and strikes ====
In the evening of Israel intercepting the flotilla, spontaneous protests occurred in various places around Europe. In Italy there were protests involving thousands of participants; hundreds protested at the Termini station in Rome and other protests were triggered in Bari, Bologna, Genoa, Milan, Palermo and other cities. With protests spreading across the country, a university building in Turin was occupied by students and activists occupied railway tracks at Torino Porta Nuova as well as in Pisa and Naples. Italian unions, including CGIL, USB and others, called for a general strike on 3 October in response to the interception.

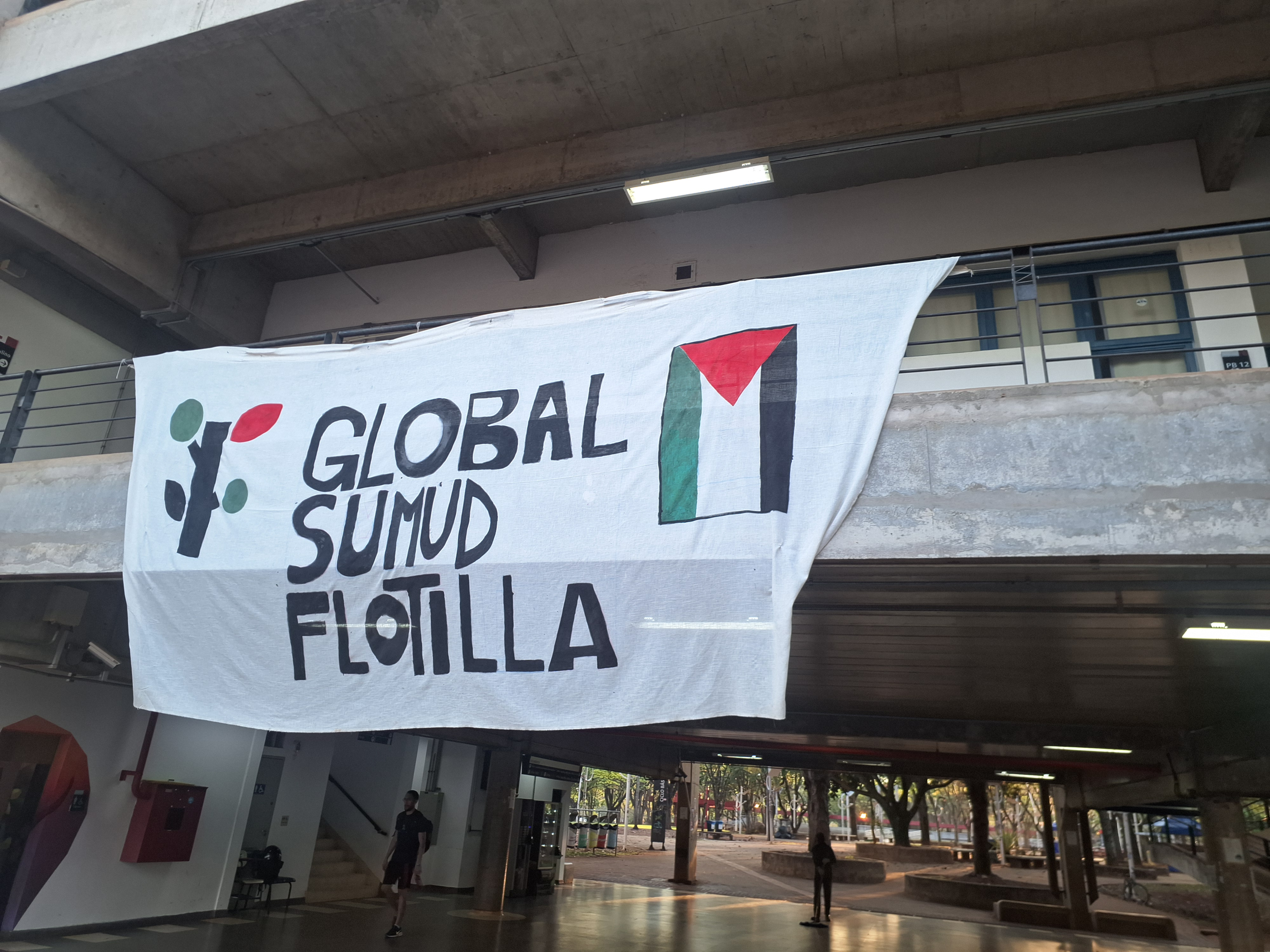
Demonstration of support for the Sumud Global Fleet at the State University of Campinas (Unicamp) on 3 October 2025.

Elsewhere protesters mobilised in support of the flotilla at the Central Station in Berlin, Germany, where a Jewish man was arrested in solidarity with the flotilla; hundreds protested in front of the US consulate in Istanbul, Turkey; in Barcelona, Spain, people protested outside the Israeli consulate. In Brussels, Belgium, protesters marched to the Belgian foreign ministry. In Tripoli, Libya, a crowd gathered in front of Algeria Square Mosque. Protests also took place in Nouakchott, Mauritania and in Tunis, Tunisia. Protests also took place in Piccadilly Circus, London, where people used fireworks in solidarity with the flotilla. Protests also took place in Athens, Greece; Buenos Aires, Argentina; Bogotá, Colombia; Dhaka, Bangladesh; Dublin, Ireland; Kuala Lumpur and Malacca City, Malaysia; Geneva, Switzerland. Caracas, Venezuela; Brasília and Rio de Janeiro, Brazil. Paris saw approximately 1,000 protesters at Place de la Republique, while in Marseille, about 100 demonstrators were arrested after attempting to block access to Eurolinks, a weapons manufacturer accused of selling military components to Israel. Protests organized by the US Campaign for Palestinian Rights also took place in the United States of America, in Seattle (Washington), Los Angeles (California), Chicago (Illinois), Macon (Georgia) and New York City (New York). On 2 October, simultaneous protests were called across the main cities of Spain, including Madrid, Bilbao, Seville, Barcelona, Zaragoza or A Coruña, with ten of thousands attending. Student protests were also called.

In Australia, Green Left announced that a protest organized by Justice for Palestine would take place on 3 October in Brisbane, to protest the interception.

After the boarding of the Flotilla, over 45 civilian ships departed from Arsuz, Hatay and protested the Flotilla's interception by chanting slogans and waving Palestinian and Turkish flags.

==== Condemnations from organizations and state actors ====
The Palestinian Foreign Ministry's spokesperson condemned the flotilla's interception as a violation of international law, and stated that Israel did not have authority or sovereignty over Palestinian territorial waters. Hamas denounced the flotilla's interception as a "criminal act" and called for public protests against Israel's actions.

The Turkish Ministry of Foreign Affairs and the Iranian Ministry of Foreign Affairs stated that the Israeli interception was a "terroristic act", adding that Israel's actions also demonstrated that "the fascist and militarist policies pursued by the genocidal Netanyahu government ... are not limited to Palestinians." President Recep Tayyip Erdoğan said Israel was engaged in "banditry" for targeting the flotilla, reiterating his country's support for "all passengers of hope aboard the flotilla".

Malaysian Prime Minister Anwar Ibrahim condemned the interception, stating that Malaysia would "use legitimate and lawful means at our disposal to ensure that Israel is held to account."

The President of Colombia, Gustavo Petro, expelled all Israeli diplomats within the country following the interceptions and ended Colombia's free trade agreement with Israel.

Yolanda Díaz, the Spanish Minister of Labour, stated that the interceptions were a crime against international law, stating the EU should cut all relations with Israel. This came after the statement of the Spanish Ministry of Foreign Affairs asking for the rights of the citizens on board to be respected. The Spanish government also summoned Israel's representative in the country.

Foreign Minister of Venezuela Yván Gil said on Telegram that Israel's move to stop the boats from getting to Gaza "exposes, once again, the criminal nature of the Zionist regime," adding that "the blockade of humanitarian aid is a tool of deliberate war, the continuation of genocide by other means, seeing to annihilate the population by starvation to complement their indiscriminate bombings."

Irish Foreign Minister Simon Harris called the Israeli action "very concerning", describing the flotilla as a "peaceful mission to shine a light on a horrific humanitarian catastrophe." The Ministry said that its embassy in Tel Aviv was speaking with Israeli authorities, further stating that their focus now is on "assisting citizens immediately impacted and their families. This will be the priority for our team over the coming hours."

South African president Cyril Ramaphosa condemned the interception, saying that it "reinforces Israel's continued violation of international law and infliction of suffering, including starvation, on the Palestinian people."

Pakistani prime minister Shehbaz Sharif called the interception a "dastardly attack" and stated "This barbarity must end. Peace must be given a chance and humanitarian aid must reach those in need."

The Foreign Minister of Belgium, Maxime Prévot, urged the Israeli government to respect international law in a statement on X.

The French La France Insoumise party accused Israel of carrying out an act of "piracy" against the Flotilla. Party leader Jean-Luc Mélenchon called France's foreign minister, Jean-Noël Barrot, an "incompetent fool" and accusing him of siding with Netanyahu, saying on X "He brings shame to our country."

The Council on American–Islamic Relations said Israel's move on the flotilla show it would "kidnap humanitarian activists and engage in piracy in international waters."

== Arrest, detention and deportations ==
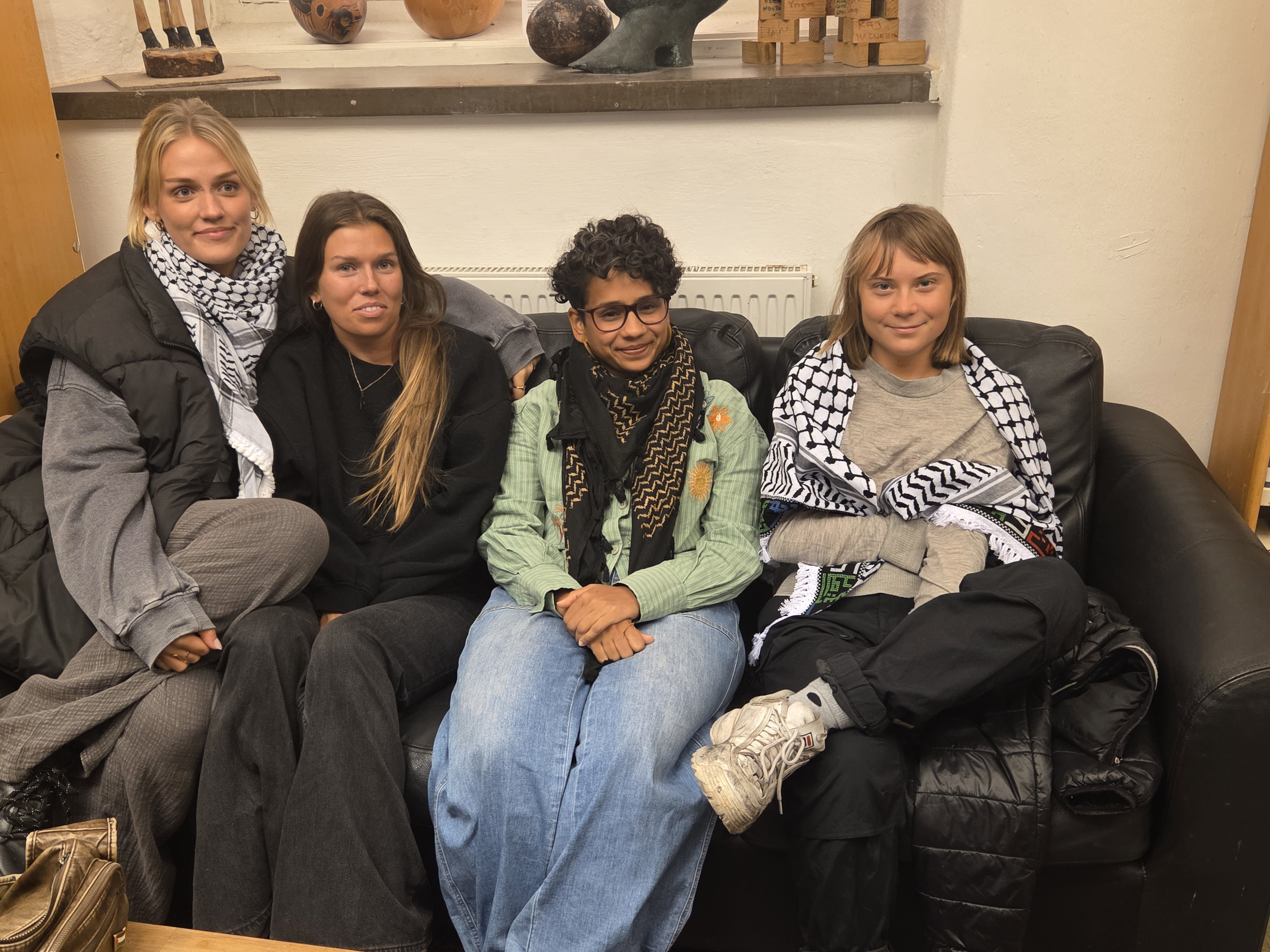
Some of the Swedish participants in the flotilla after coming home

After the interception, GSF activists were arrested and transferred to Ktzi'ot Prison in the Negev desert, where severe abuses against Palestinian inmates had been previously reported by human rights groups such as B'Tselem.

On 3 October 2025, four Italian parliamentarians who had been detained (namely Annalisa Corrado, Marco Croatti, Arturo Scotto and Benedetta Scuderi) left Israel from Ben Gurion Airport after their diplomatic immunity was recognized by the Israeli government. They were the first members of the flotilla to be released and leave the country. The parliamentarians reported that, during the flight, the pilot announced on the public address system: "There are four people with us whom we must remind that Am Yisrael Chai." The announcement incited some passengers to insult the parliamentarians, while one Jewish Israeli passenger reportedly thanked them.

Also on 3 October, Swiss diplomats visited the nineteen Swiss nationals from the flotilla who were being detained. The Swiss foreign ministry said Israeli security officials interrupted the visit due to "various incidents" and that it was planning to file a formal diplomatic protest over the matter.

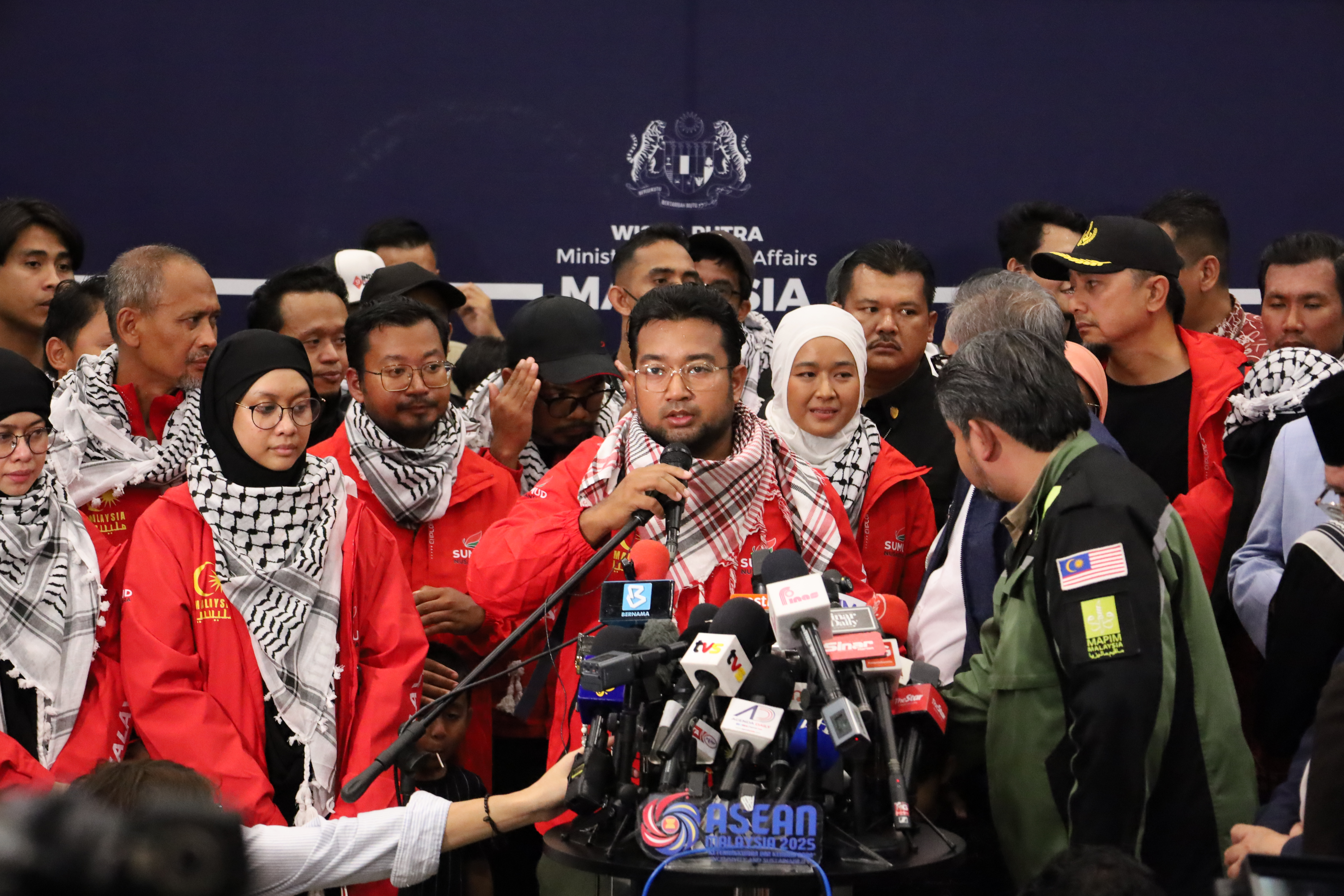
Volunteers representing Sumud Nusantara held a press conference at Kuala Lumpur International Airport upon returning to Malaysia.

On 4 October, Israel deported to Turkey 137 of the GSF activists, flying them on Turkish Airlines. The deported activists include 36 Turkish citizens, and nationals from the US, the UAE, Algeria, Morocco, Italy, Kuwait, Libya, Malaysia, Mauritania, Switzerland, Tunisia and Jordan.

By 5 October 42 detainees had gone on a hunger strike to protest their arrest and Israel's "campaign of total starvation" in the Gaza Strip. On the same day, flotilla participant Reyes Rigo Serviá, a Spanish activist, reportedly bit a nurse after a check-up, leading to an extension of her arrest. She was scheduled to have been deported by the end of the following day. On 5 October, Israel deported to Spain 29 participants from Spain, Portugal and the Netherlands. On 6 October, Israel deported 171 additional activists to Greece and Slovakia. The group included Greta Thunberg along with activists from Greece, Italy, France, Ireland, Sweden, Poland, Germany, Bulgaria, Lithuania, Austria, Luxembourg, Finland, Denmark, Slovakia, Switzerland, Norway, the UK, Serbia, and the United States.

The next day, seven Australian participants were deported to Jordan, and by the end of the day the GSF updated their website to show only six participants still being held in detention: Serviá, who was accused of biting a prison official, two Moroccans, and three Norwegians. By 8 October, three New Zealand participants had been deported to Jordan as part of a group of 131 flotilla participants. By 10 October, the three New Zealanders had returned to Auckland.

=== Reports of mistreatment during detention ===
The legal center Adalah reported that some participants were kicked when trying to sleep, pushed around and some got constraint with cables behind their back for a few hours. Furthermore, the Flotilla legal team stated that the prisoners were forced to "kneel with their hands tied for at least 5 hours" and were later approached by Minister of Security Itamar Ben-Gvir "with the clear intent of humiliating and intimidating them". The prisoners also reported being "filmed in a degrading manner".

Italian Ministry of Foreign Affairs Antonio Tajani, upon sending some officials to visit the prisoners, described their conditions as "particularly dire". Italian MP and Flotilla member Arturo Scotto compared the methods of the Israeli police to those of Pinochet's Chile and of the Italian authories during the 2001 G8 summit incidents in Genoa.

The Swedish embassy in Israel reported that Greta Thunberg, according to her own account, was dehydrated after receiving insufficient amounts of food and water, had developed seemingly bedbug-related rashes, and had been forced to sit on hard surfaces for prolonged periods. Speaking to CNN upon landing in Turkey, recently freed activists added that Thunberg had been subjected to humiliating treatments, which include dragging her by her hair, making her crawl, and forcing her to kiss and wear the Israeli flag. One released activist compared her mistreatment to Nazi tortures. Thunberg told Swedish newspaper Aftonbladet that she had been repeatedly kicked, stripped naked and filmed, deprived of water and sleep, and that Israeli guards threatened to gas the detained activists. Several Swedish members of the flotilla criticized the Ministry for Foreign Affairs for providing insufficient support and downplaying the abuse.

Other mistreatments reported by activists after their release include being held in overcrowded cages; physical injuries; theft of personal belongings; intimidation with dogs and weaponry; being denied medical care including insulin, HIV medication, and EpiPens; being denied menstrual products; lack of clean drinking water and food; forcible removal of hijabs; inhumane treatment, torture and abuse; being made to drink toilet water; and being forced to watch footage of the October 7 attacks. Italian journalist Saverio Tommasi reported he felt they were being treated "like monkeys".

The Israeli Ministry of Foreign Affairs has dismissed these reports and testimonies as "brazen lies" and "baseless allegations". However, without addressing any specific reports of mistreatment, Ben-Gvir stated that he was "proud" of the harsh conditions the flotilla members were being put through, referring to them as "terrorists".

=== Legal cases ===
In November 2025, in a legal case filed by the Istanbul Bar Association against 37 Israeli officials in relation to the Gaza genocide, David Saar Salama, an Israeli naval commander, was indicted under universal jurisdiction, accused of having violated Turkish law and United Nations Convention on the Law of the Sea in relation to the interception of the flotilla and the detention and torturing of the flotilla participants.

In November 2025, Israel's prosecution filed a request to confiscate 50 vessels from the flotilla, reiterating the claim that some were owned by Hamas members and alleging that Israeli courts have the authority, according to international law, to seize vessels that try to violate their naval blockade.

== Subsequent flotilla voyages ==
A new flotilla of 9 ships, organised by the Freedom Flotilla Coalition and Thousand Madleens to Gaza, sailed towards Gaza during late September/early October 2025. The flotilla included about 150 participants altogether. One of the ships was the 68-metre-long Conscience, which was hit by drones in May 2025 near Malta while en route to Gaza carrying aid.

Conscience left the port of Otranto on 30 September or 1 October, carrying about a hundred activists, including doctors, nurses, other health workers, journalists, lawyers, Turkish members of parliament, and a Buddhist monk. On 3 October, the nine ship flotilla was near the coast of Crete. On 7 October, Italian MP Marco Croatti, member of the Five Star Movement (MV5S) and participant of the Global Sumud Flotilla asked the Italian government to protect the Italian participants of the initiative.

On 8 October 2025, the Israeli military attacked, intercepted and boarded all nine boats about 120 nautical miles from Gaza, in international waters, and detained the passengers. The boarding of one of the boats was live-streamed, showing the moment when a soldier damaged a camera by hitting it with a machine gun. This was the second interception of its kind within one week.

=== 2026 Global Sumud Flotilla ===
In December 2025, the Global Sumud Flotilla announced their interest in organizing a new flotilla that would take place in the spring of 2026, this time with at least 100 ships, with 3,000 participants (1,000 of which to be medics that would later stay in the Gaza Strip) from at the very least 100 countries.

Beginning on April 10, boats set out from Marseille and Naples to join others from Barcelona and form a flotilla of over 50 boats aiming to break the blockade.

In the early hours of April 30, interceptions by the IDF began off Crete.

The Israeli military seized 22 ships belonging to the Sumud Flotilla Global Flotilla. On board the aid vessels, which were headed for Gaza, were more than 160 activists. The seizure took place in international waters near Greece, after which Israeli forces transferred the individuals to the Greek island of Crete. According to reports, of the boats that had set sail from Barcelona, Spain, as part of the flotilla, 22 were intercepted in the Mediterranean Sea by armed groups using drones and communication jamming technology. The remaining 47 boats continued sailing. The incident drew a range of reactions. In an interview with Al Jazeera on Wednesday, Sumud Flotilla Global Flotilla spokesperson Gor Tzabar described the Israeli attack on the ships as "a direct and illegal attack on civilian and unarmed boats in international waters." He condemned Israel’s actions and characterized the detention of activists as a kidnapping on the high seas. Authorities in several countries condemned the seizure of the Gaza-bound boats as a violation of international law. Turkey called the event an "act of piracy." Spain also labeled the seizure "illegal," while Germany and Italy expressed "grave concern" and called for the release of those detained.

Several people were detained, including Pablo Giachello, an Argentine provincial deputy.

In May 2026, after Israeli forces intercepted the Global Sumud Flotilla, Itamar Ben-Gvir released videos showing him taunting detained activists. The footage showed activists kneeling with their hands tied behind their backs, while Ben-Gvir called for them to be imprisoned for a long period. Multiple flotilla activists alleged sexual abuse, including rape, while in detention, which Israeli authorities denied.

=== 2026 Nuestra América Flotilla ===
In February 2026, it was announced that the Nuestra América Flotilla would attempt to break the United States embargo against Cuba. The organizers of the flotilla include several members of the Global Sumud Flotilla.

== See also ==
- Global March to Gaza – 2025 international march to Rafah border crossing
- July 2025 Gaza Freedom Flotilla – Attempt to break the Israeli blockade of the Gaza Strip
- Soumoud Convoy – 2025 attempt by land to break the Gaza Strip blockade
