= Pablo Giachello =

Argentine politician (born c. 1986)

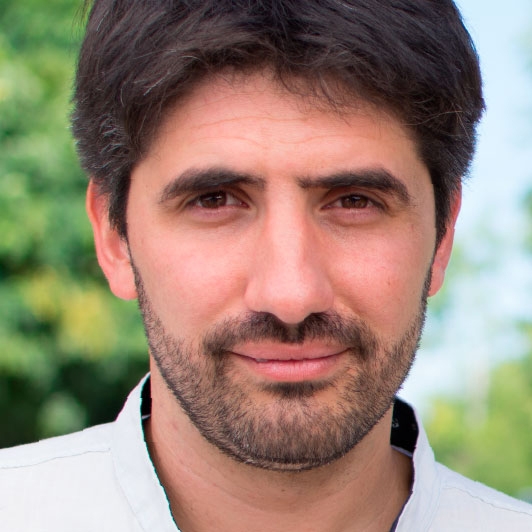
- Pablo Giachello in 2019
- Born: Pablo Giachello
- Occupation: Political activist
- Known for: Gaza humanitarian missions
- Political party: Workers' Party

Pablo Giachello (born c. 1986) is an activist in the Workers' Party (Argentina) and a provincial deputy in Buenos Aires Province.

He took part in the Global Sumud Flotilla in 2026, and was one of a number of people in the flotilla who was captured by the Israelis off the coast of Greece.
