= San Giovanni li Cuti =

San Giovanni li Cuti is a small seaside village in the eastern part of the city of Catania, with one of the most famous beaches of the city.

It has been part of the II Circoscrizione (Second District) since 2013, resulting from the aggregation of the former II and IV Municipalities, thus also including the districts of Picanello-Ognina/Barriera-Canalicchio, Villaggio Cardinale Dusmet, and Guardia.

Historic sites include the Church of San Giuseppe in Ognina, Via Grasso Finocchiaro. A t the east end of the village is a large war memorial.

In 2025, Porto di San Giovanni li Cuti was the departure point for one of the convoys participating in the Global Sumud Flotilla.

== Origins of the name ==
The title of San Giovanni refers to a church dedicated to St. John the Baptist, now perhaps no longer existing, which was part of the parish of Santa Maria della Guardia, in the district of Guardia.

In Sicilian, the term "li cuti" is used to indicate formations of lava origin or rocks subjected to the erosive action of the sea.

== Geological composition ==
San Giovanni li Cuti is located in an area covered by various lava flows, with specific events in 1169, 1329, and 1381, the latter being the year in which part of the ancient Porto Ulisse was also covered; this stretch of coast is known as the Scogliera (the Cliff).

The beach is made up of black volcanic sand, and access to the sea is via lava rocks.
