= Benedetta Scuderi =

Italian politician (born 1991)

Benedetta Scuderi MEP
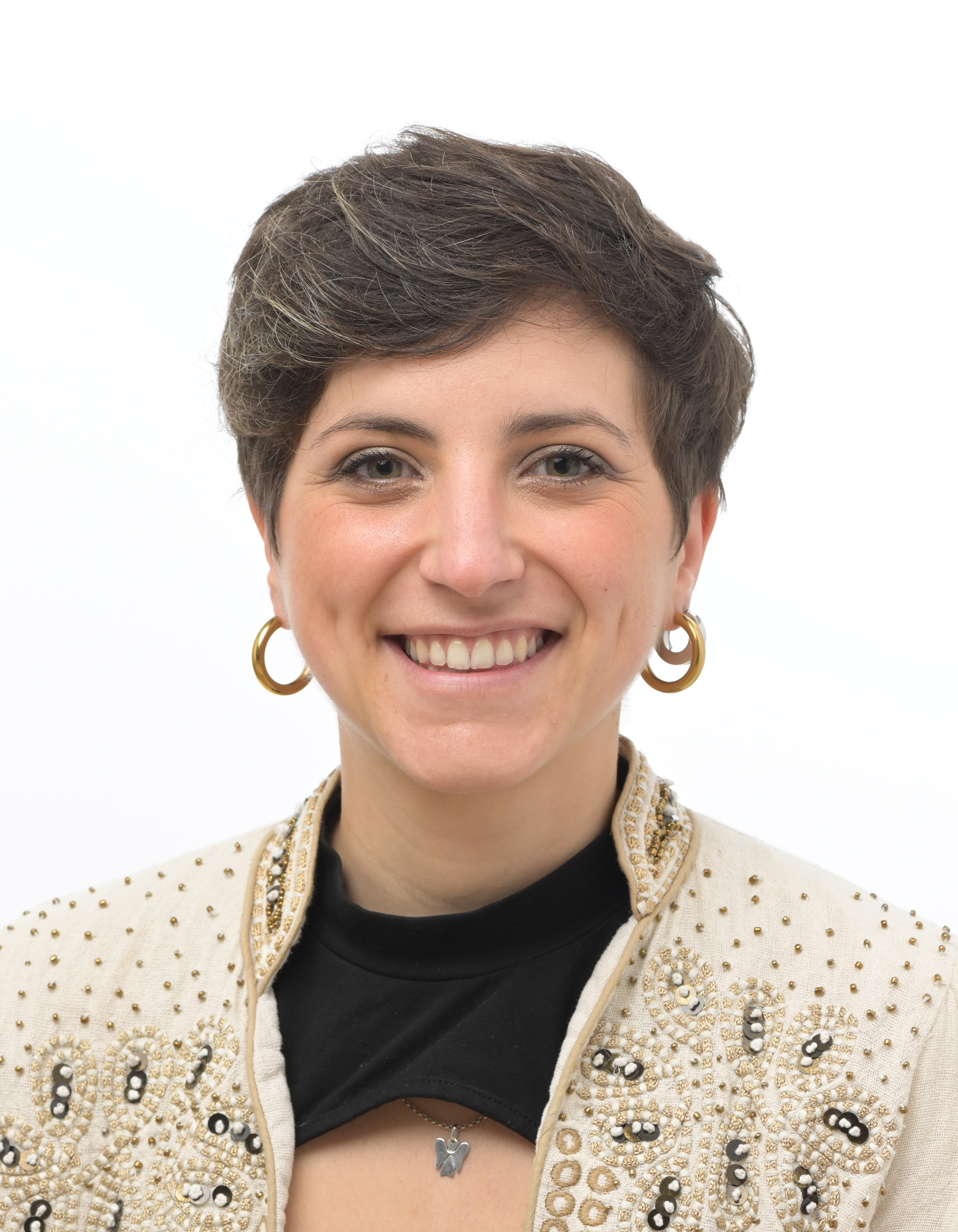

Member of the European Parliament
- Incumbent
- Assumed office 16 July 2024
- Constituency: North-West Italy

Personal details
- Born: 8 September 1991 (age 35) Agropoli, Italy
- Party: Green Europe (since 2021); Federation of the Greens (2019–2021)
- Other political affiliations: European Green Party
- Education: Bocconi University; University College London

Benedetta Scuderi (born 8 September 1991) is an Italian politician of Green Europe who was elected member of the European Parliament in 2024. She has served as co-spokesperson of the Federation of Young European Greens from 2022 to 2024.

== Early life and career ==
Scuderi was born in Agropoli in the province of Salerno. She graduated with honors in Law from Roma Tre University, holds a Master's Degree in sustainability and energy from Bocconi University, and a Master's Degree in public policy from University College London.

After working for Libera she joined Greens in 2019, and was later a co-founder of Green Europe's youth wing.

On 1 October 2025, she was detained by Israel alongside three other Italian lawmakers while participating in the Global Sumud Flotilla which aimed to carry aid to the Gaza Strip; the group subsequently filed a criminal complaint with the Public Prosecutor's Office in Rome.
