= Marco Croatti =

Italian politician (born 1972)

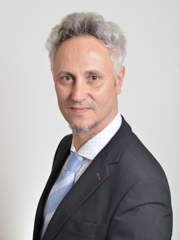
- Croatti in 2018

Member of the Senate of the Republic
- Incumbent
- Assumed office 23 March 2018
- Constituency: Emilia-Romagna – P01 (2018–2022); Emilia-Romagna – P02 (2022–present)

Personal details
- Born: 17 September 1972 (age 53)
- Party: Five Star Movement

Marco Croatti (born 17 September 1972) is an Italian politician serving as a member of the Senate since 2018. He has served as secretary of the Senate since 2022. He represents the Five Star Movement, of which he is regional coordinator in Emilia-Romagna together with Gabriele Lanzi.

On 1 October 2025, he was detained by Israel alongside three other Italian lawmakers while participating in the Global Sumud Flotilla which aimed to carry aid to the Gaza Strip; the group subsequently filed a criminal complaint with the Public Prosecutor's Office in Rome.
