= Sumud Nusantara =

Civilian convoy taking aid to the Gaza Strip

- Formation: 25 July 2025; 15 months ago
- Type: Civil society; Humanitarian coalition
- Purpose: Breaking the Israeli blockade; delivering humanitarian aid to the Gaza Strip; ending genocide in Gaza
- Headquarters: Sumud Nusantara Command Centre, MAPIM Central Warehouse, Sepang, Selangor, Malaysia
- Director: Nadir Al-Nuri
- Affiliations: Global Sumud Flotilla
- Website: sumudnusantara.com

Sumud Nusantara is a regional solidarity movement from Southeast Asia formed in 2025 to represent the Global Sumud Flotilla (GSF) convoy efforts. The movement joined the maritime humanitarian aid mission aiming to break the Israeli blockade of the Gaza Strip. It consists of civil organizations and youth movements from Malaysia and eight other countries. It is named from ṣumūd (Arabic for 'resilience') and Nusantara (Kawi for 'outer islands', a name now usually referring to the Malay Archipelago).

== Aims ==
The movement is said to be driven as "the common civil voice who reluctantly became the spectators for the thousands of innocent Gaza citizen who gradually face death by famine due to the aid blockade and border closure."

== Involvement ==
Together with the Global Movement to Gaza, Freedom Flotilla Coalition, and Maghreb Sumud Convoy, the movement formed a steering committee to form the Global Sumud Flotilla.

The participants of the convoy came from nine countries, Malaysia, Indonesia, Thailand, Pakistan, Bangladesh, Sri Lanka, Philippines, Maldives, and Bhutan.

The Malaysian Consultative Council of Islamic Organization (MAPIM) also launched the Sumud Nusantara Command Centre at the MAPIM Central Warehouse, Sepang, responsible for coordinating communication for the Sumud Flotilla mission which involves various countries and humanitarian organizations from the region.

== Responses ==
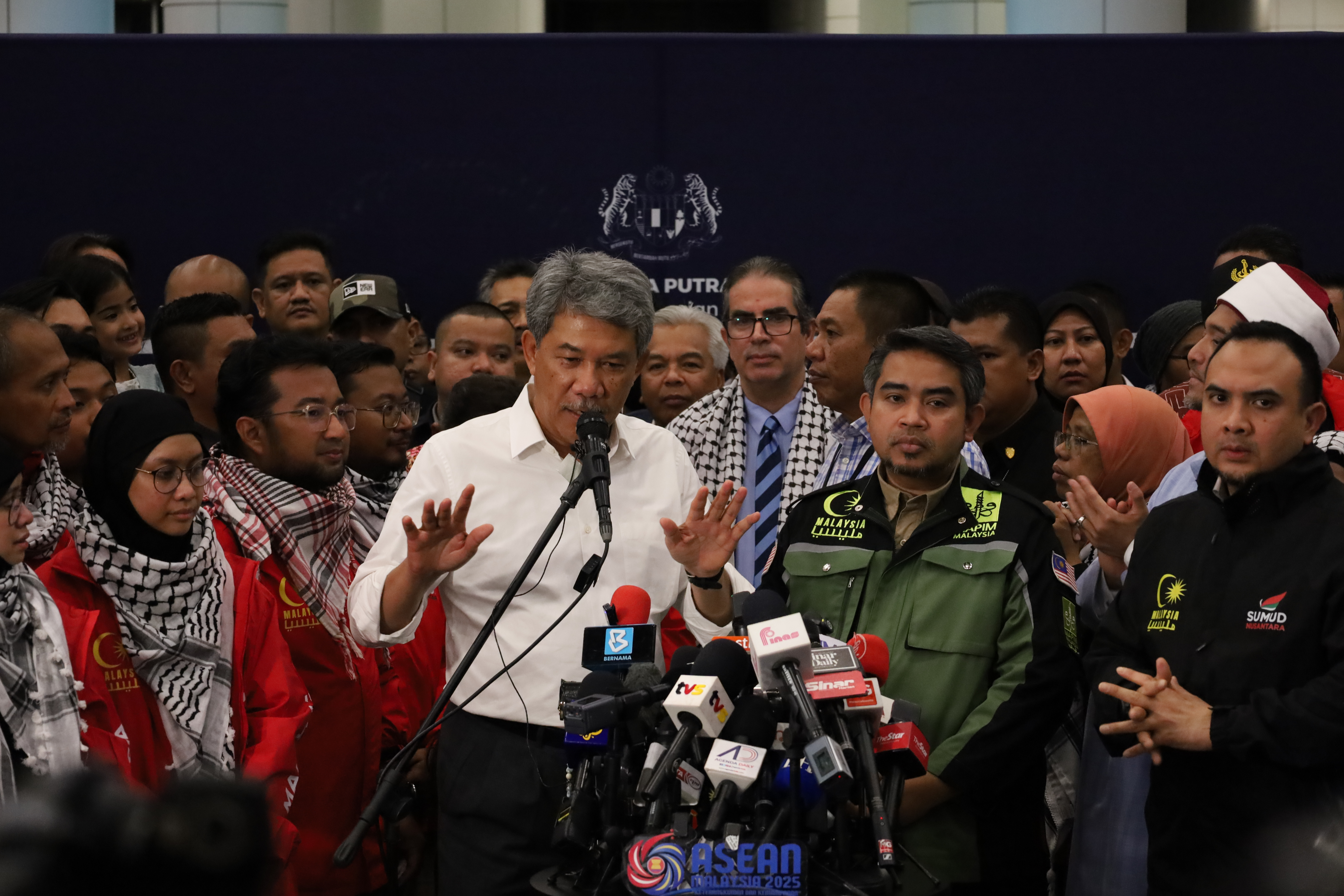
Malaysian Minister of Foreign Affairs, Mohamad Hasan speaking at a press conference upon the volunteers' return to Malaysia on 7 October 2025.

=== Malaysia ===
The Malaysian government stated their commitment to help all Sumud Nusantara and GSF participants who join the mission. Prime Minister Anwar Ibrahim is also the patron of Sumud Nusantara, and launched the flag-off for Sumud Nusantara at the Merdeka Square, Kuala Lumpur.

=== Indonesia ===
The Indonesia delegation, named the Indonesian Global Peace Convoy (IGPC), is a part of Sumud Nusantara and consists of 26 volunteers, activists, and journalists. Deputy Foreign Minister, Anis Matta, expressed support for forms of activity towards Palestinian independence, including IGPC's activities.
