= Kleoniki Alexopoulou =

Greek historian (born 1984)

- Κλεονίκη Αλεξοπούλου
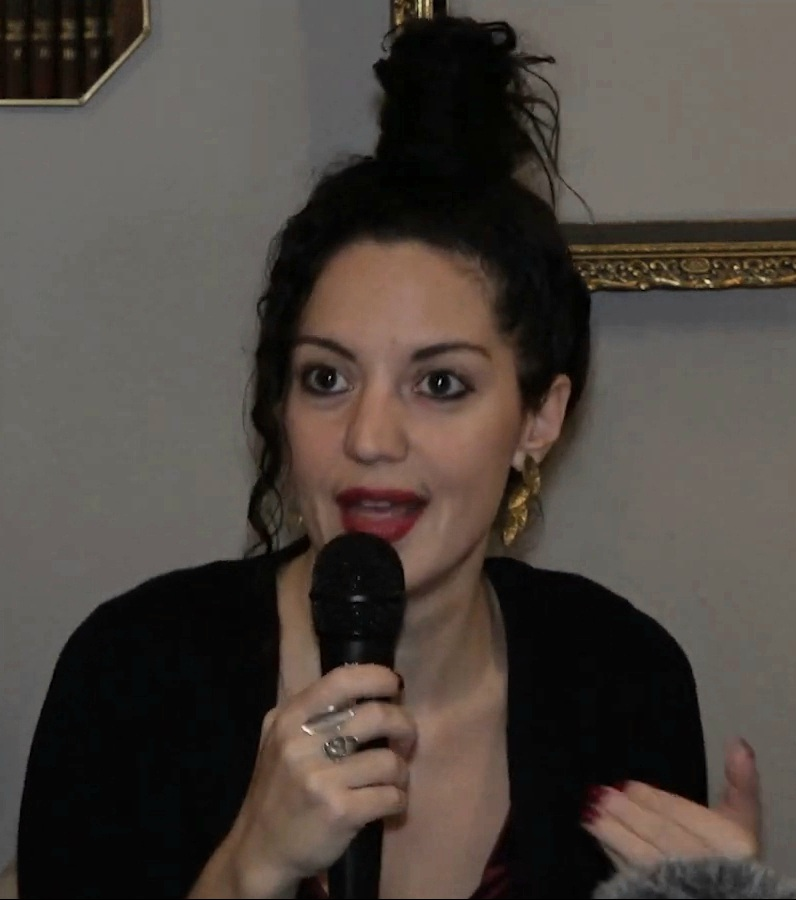
- Alexopoulou in December 2022
- Born: 19 October 1984 (age 41); Athens, Greece
- Occupations: Historian; academic

Academic background
- Education: Panteion University; University of Athens; Utrecht University; Leiden University; Wageningen University

Academic work
- Discipline: History
- Sub-discipline: Economic history; social history; colonialism; Global South
- Institutions: Panteion University; Wageningen University; PIIRS; NOVA University Lisbon; University of Tübingen; University of Bologna

Kleoniki Alexopoulou (Greek: Κλεονίκη Αλεξοπούλου; born 19 October 1984) is a Greek historian specializing in economic and social history, colonialism, and the Global South. She has taught at Panteion University in Athens – as well as several other European institutions – and has served as an Academic Fellow at the Research Centre for the Humanities in Athens.

After graduating in Political Science and Sociology at Panteion University and the University of Athens, and in International Development at Utrecht University, in 2018 she completed a PhD on the fiscal regimes of Portuguese colonies (1850–1975) at Wageningen University. Her academic work includes a co-authored article with Jörg Baten in the European Review of Economic History, which examines elite violence and numeracy in Africa from 1400 to 1950, a paper on numeracy levels in Ottoman Turkey and Ottoman Greece, as well as research on fiscal and labour systems in colonial Africa. In 2024–25, Alexopoulou was selected as a Fung Global Fellow at the Princeton Institute for International and Regional Studies (PIIRS), where she focused on the theme of "colonial residues".

In 2025, she was part of the steering committee of the Global Sumud Flotilla, an international civil society initiative aimed at challenging the Israeli naval blockade of the Gaza Strip and establishing a humanitarian corridor.
