= Nadir Al-Nuri =

Malaysian humanitarian activist

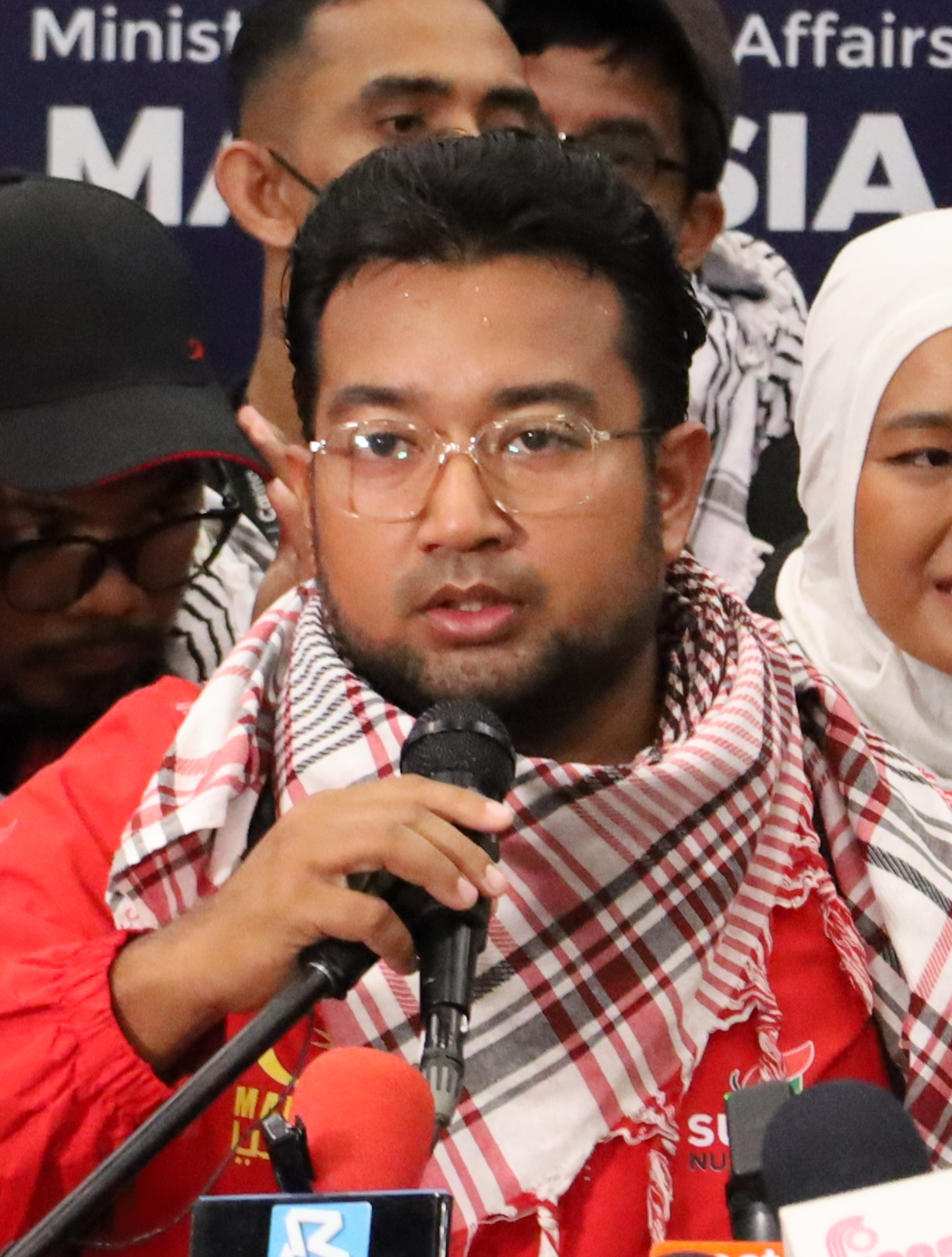
- Born: Muhammad Nadir Al-Nuri bin Kamaruzaman; 1987 (age 38–39); Scotland
- Education: Universiti Malaysia Sabah; Islamic University of Gaza
- Organization(s): Cinta Gaza Malaysia; Sumud Nusantara
- Spouse: Reem Al-Minawi

Muhammad Nadir Al-Nuri bin Kamaruzaman (born 1987), also known as Nadir Al-Nuri, is a humanitarian activist from Malaysia who previously stayed in Gaza Strip, Palestine. He is the founder and chief executive officer for a non-profit organization, Cinta Gaza Malaysia (CGM). In 2021, He become a co-founder for a humanitarian coalition in Malaysia, named MyAqsa Defenders. He also was a columnist for newspaper and portal, Harian Metro. In 2025, he became a steering committee for Global Sumud Flotilla, and be the director-general for its Southeast Asia chapter, Sumud Nusantara.

== Life and education background ==
Nadir was born at Scotland on 1987 when his father continued his doctoral study there. Nadir studied at Hulu Langat High Religious School and Bestari High Religious School both in Selangor, Malaysia.Nadir continued his study in foundation level at University of Malaya, before continued his bachelor level in Universiti Malaysia Sabah (UMS) in marine science for four years. Then, he took Arabic language diploma at Damascus, Syria before he continued his study in syariah studies at the Islamic University of Gaza in 2013. He stayed in Gaza, Palestine since 2013 until he came back to Malaysia in 2023.

== Gaza flotilla ==
Nadir joined an international humanitarian initiative, named Global Sumud Flotilla, becoming a member of the steering committee. He also became the director-general for its Southeast Asia chapter, Sumud Nusantara.

== Bibliography ==
- Nadir al-Nuri (2023). Anak Melayu di Palestin: Sedekad di Penjara Terbesar Dunia. Bangi: Cinta Gaza Malaysia. ISBN 9786299752905.
- Nadir al-Nuri (2022). Seinci Dari Kematian: Sedekad di Penjara Terbesar Dunia. Bangi: Cinta Gaza Malaysia. ISBN 9786299752905.
- Nadir al-Nuri (2021). Sedekad di Penjara Terbesar Dunia. Palm Strategic Initiative Centre. ISBN 9789672568506.
