= Tadhg Hickey =

Irish comedian

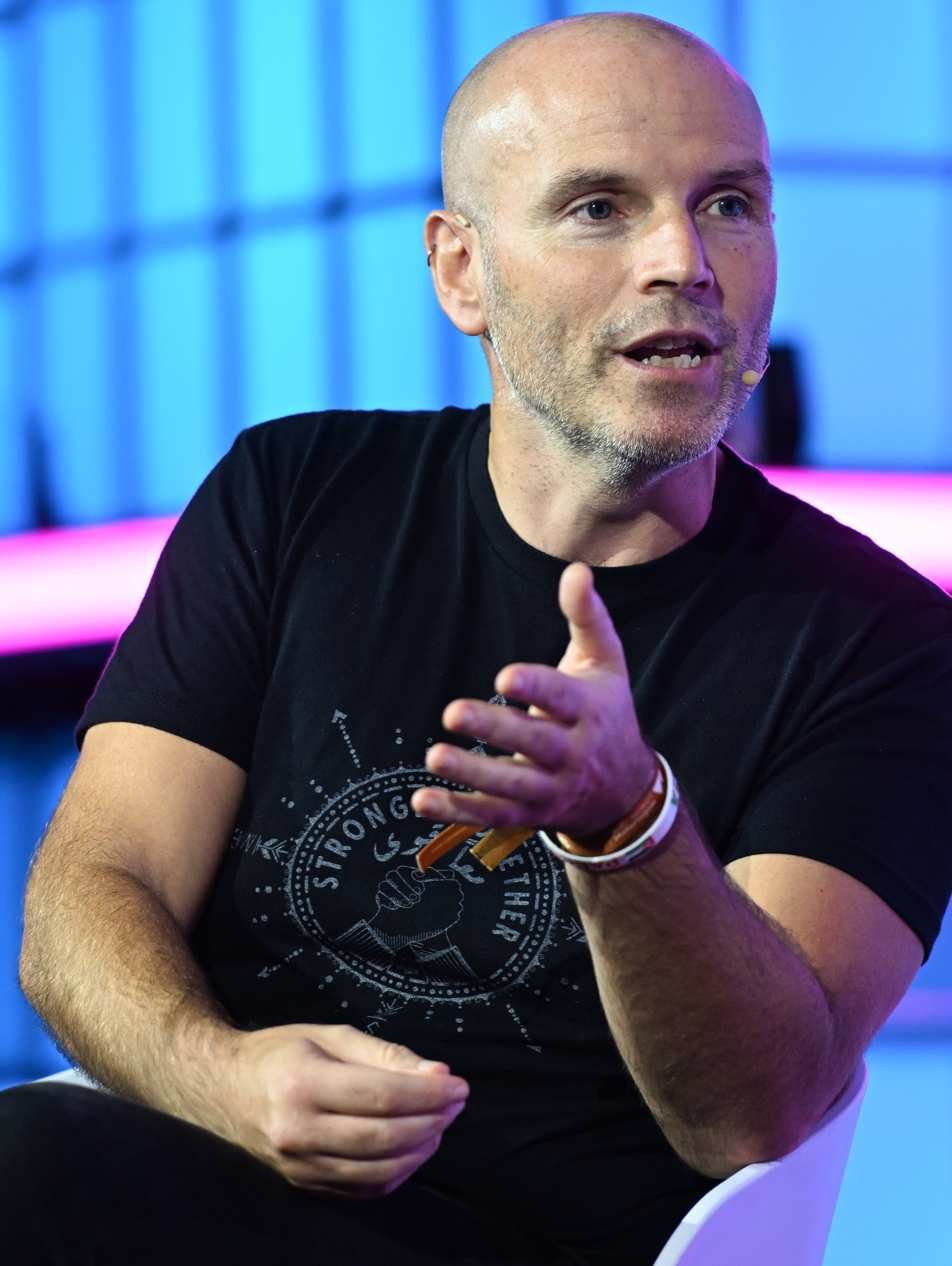
- Hickey in November 2025
- Born: 1982 or 1983 (age 43–44); Cork, Ireland
- Education: University College Cork

Comedy career
- Years active: 2015–present
- Genres: Political satire and stand-up comedy

Tadhg Hickey (/taɪɡ/ TYGHE; born 1982 or 1983) is an Irish comedian, writer, filmmaker and political activist, known for his video shorts on social media, and work in television and theatre. He has gained recognition for his sketches regarding social and political commentary.

== Early life and education ==
Hickey was born in Cork and raised in MacCurtain's Villas in Cork city, Ireland. He grew up in a working-class background, his father working in a car manufacturing plant. He was the first in his family to go to University College Cork, where he studied philosophy. In a 2023 interview he stated that, in his early adult years, he was influenced by people like Ricky Gervais, James Joyce, Kehinde Andrews, Steve Coogan, Claire Keegan, Roy Andersson and John Pilger.

== Comedy ==
Hickey has worked in television and film. Some of these productions, broadcast on RTÉ, included Ronanism (2015), and The School (2017).

Hickey has written several stage plays, including GATMAN and In One Eye, Out the Other, which were performed in theatres such as the Everyman in Cork, Smock Alley in Dublin, and the Playhouse in Derry.

In 2019, he was shortlisted for a "best performer" award at the Dublin Fringe Festival. A short film, written by Hickey and titled Uisce Beatha, won the first runner-up prize at the Ford '8 Minutes' short film competition in 2012.

Hickey has stated that his comedy draws inspiration from numerous sources, including the British version of The Office, J. D. Salinger’s 1951 work The Catcher in the Rye, Claire Keegan's 2021 novel Small Things like These, James Joyce, Kehinde Andrews, Steve Coogan (in particular his Alan Partridge character) and John Pilger.

In autumn 2023, Hickey had been touring with his stand-up show titled The Marxist Terrorist-Supporting Scumbag Tour in the UK and Ireland. This show focused on themes such as dysfunctional families and decolonialism or as he quoted "his raison d'être - trying to break up the United Kingdom through the unusual medium of comedy".

== Political commentary and activism ==
Hickey identifies as an Irish republican. When Irish rugby fans adopted The Cranberries song Zombie during the 2023 Rugby World Cup as an unofficial anthem, Hickey called it a "partitionist anthem" which showed a "complete lack of understanding" from those in the Republic of Ireland "to what was happening to nationalists across the border" in Northern Ireland. Hickey is supportive of Welsh and Scottish independence movements; in October 2023, he stated that Irish, Scottish, and Welsh republicans were "the same movement", arguing that these causes represented a shared anti-imperialist struggle and that civic groups across the three nations should organise together as a left alliance aimed at the eventual breakup of the United Kingdom.

After the 2023 Hamas-led attack on Israel, he increased his focus with multiple sketches about the "hypocrisy" of its coverage by Western media outlets. Hickey's activism on behalf of Palestine led him to accept an invitation to visit Iran where, in May 2024, he accepted an award at the Sobh Media Festival. When in Tehran, he attended the funeral of president Ebrahim Raisi and was filmed chanting 'death to Israel' in Farsi. Hickey said that he had been taught the chant by someone he met on the street and did so without any knowledge of Farsi.

As of mid-2024, Hickey's political satire videos on social media had more than 100 million views globally.

In 2021, Hickey raised over €30,000 for Aida Palestinian Refugee Camp and he also participated in fundraisers and a 24-hour fast organised to mark International Day of Solidarity with the Palestinian People. In October 2024, Hickey was one of the many Irish artists that lead protests against the use of Shannon Airport and Irish airspace for the transport of weapons in the on-going Israeli-Palestinian conflict.

In February 2025, Hickey took part in a trip to Beirut alongside other international influencers to attend the funeral of Hezbollah leader Hassan Nasrallah, tour southern Lebanon, and participate in a conference titled "Global Awakening and Palestine", described as a forum for coordinating pro-Iran and pro-Hezbollah narratives. During the visit he publicly praised Nasrallah and spoke of what he called a "media revolution", stating that people were no longer looking to outlets such as CNN and the BBC but instead turning to "independent media".

In August 2025, Hickey took part in the Global Sumud Flotilla, a civilian-led attempt to break the Israeli blockade of the Gaza Strip. On 2 October 2025, he released a pre-recorded video where he anticipated his capture by Israeli forces and stated that: "If you're watching this video, I have been kidnapped by the IDF in international waters, which is completely illegal, and taken to Israel against my will", adding a request that people "put pressure on the Irish government to end its complicity in the genocide in Gaza and to get me home". Hickey was one of 16 Irish people released on 6 October 2025.

== Personal life ==
Hickey has two daughters and is a supporter of Celtic F.C. A recovering alcoholic, he has written a book about his experiences of this addiction. In a 2022 interview, he stated that he "replaced that addiction [to alcohol] with an addiction to work and social media".

== Bibliography ==
- Hickey, Tadhg (2023). A Portrait of the Piss Artist as a young man. London, England. ISBN 9781867564072. OCLC 1401073518.
