= Army Staff (Italy) =

The Army Staff (Stato maggiore dell'Esercito or SME) is the army staff for the Italian Army.

With the creation of the posts of Chief of the Defence Staff and the Defence Staff, the Army Staff has shifted away from the army's political definition to focus on study, research, development and general organization.
