= Adamas, Milos =

Adamantas Αδάμαντας
- Community
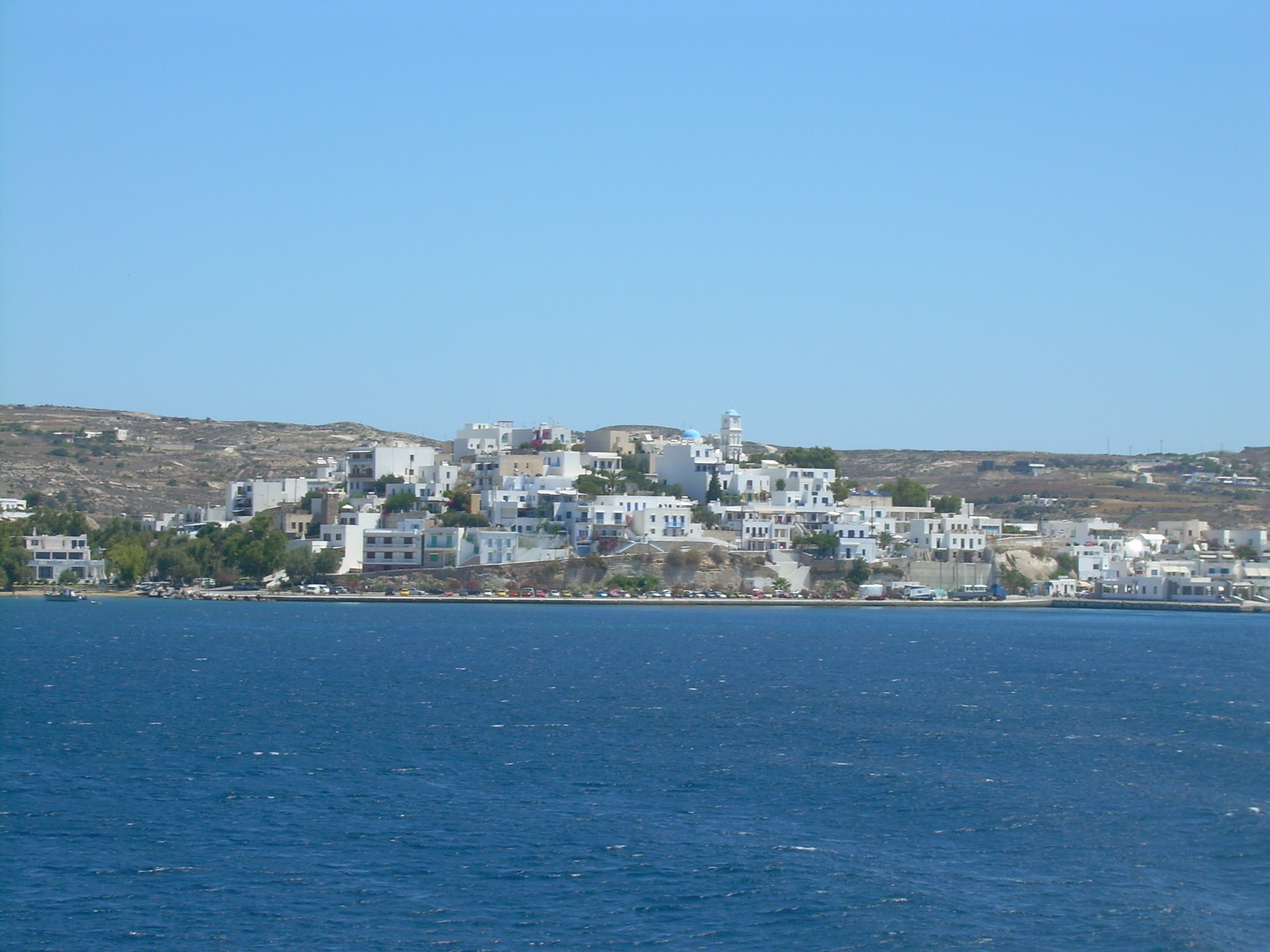

- Location within Greece
- Coordinates: 36°43.5′N 24°26.7′E
- Country: Greece
- Administrative region: South Aegean
- Regional unit: Milos
- Municipality: Milos

Population (2021)
  - Community: 1,268
- Time zone: UTC+2 (EET)
  - Summer (DST): UTC+3 (EEST)
- Vehicle registration: EM

Adamas (Greek: Αδάμαντας, older form Αδάμας, from the Greek αδάμας adamas 'diamond') is the harbour town of Milos island. It has a population of 1,268 people (2021).

Highlights include the French cemetery, used in the years of the Crimean war; the 600-year-old church of the Holy Trinity; the Milos Mining Museum; and the Maritime Museum.

Adamantas is the cultural and commercial centre of the island.

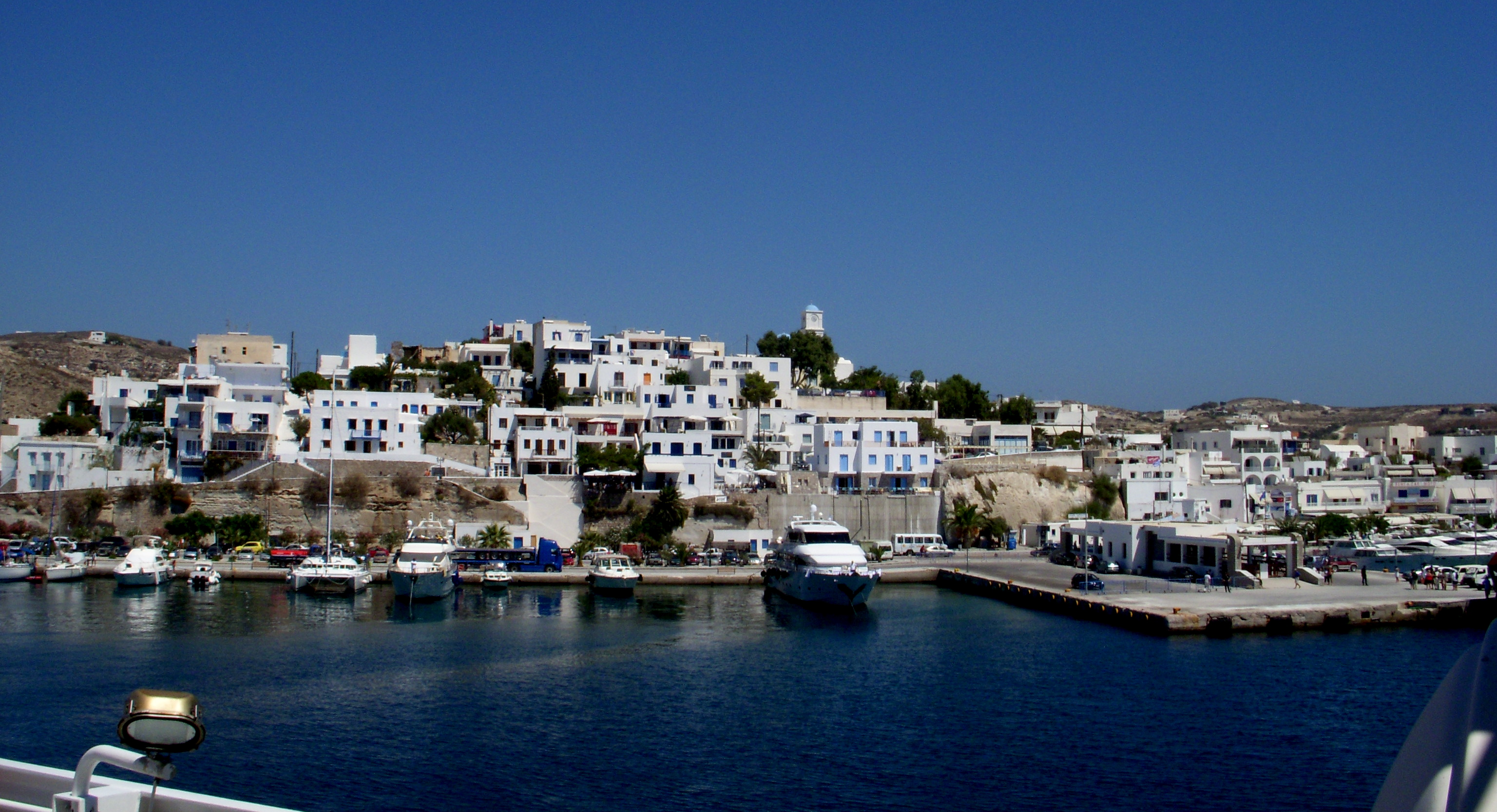
