= Rahma Zein =

Egyptian Journalist

- Occupations: Media personality, Journalist
- Known for: Activism

Rahma Zein is an Egyptian journalist known for her viral confrontation with CNN reporter Clarissa Ward, at the Rafah Border Crossing on October 20, 2023. She accused Ward of biased reporting that she believed was legitimizing the ongoing Israeli invasion of the Gaza Strip. She has also made numerous appearances on broadcasts following the Israeli invasion of Gaza, with her interview on Piers Morgan Uncensored drawing international attention.

== Personal life ==
Zein comes from a prominent Egyptian media family. Her grandfather, Mohsen Mohamed, was the Editor in Chief of Al Gomhuria during President Anwar Al Sadat’s rule, and her grandmother, Hend Abu El Seoud, held the position of Vice President of Egyptian State Television. Her mother, Mervat Mohsen, was a reporter who interviewed notable figures such as American President Bill Clinton and Secretary of State Condoleezza Rice.

== See also ==
- Mass media in Egypt
- Israeli-Palestinian conflict
