= List of participants in the 2010 Gaza Freedom Flotilla =

There were 688 participants on the 2010 Gaza Freedom Flotilla from 41 nations. The flotilla was raided and captured by Israeli naval forces on 31 May 2010, when nine participants were killed and seven IDF commandos were injured.

Notable flotilla passengers included Mairead Corrigan, Nobel Peace Prize winner, Denis Halliday, former UN Assistant Secretary-General, Edward Peck, former U.S. Ambassador to Iraq, Fehmi Bülent Yıldırım, the İHH president, Haneen Zoabi, an Israeli-Arab member of Knesset, Raed Salah, the leader of the northern branch of the Islamic Movement in Israel, Hilarion Capucci, a retired titular archbishop previously convicted by Israel of smuggling arms to the Palestine Liberation Army.

== Nationalities ==
These are the nationalities participated:

| Nationality | No. of participants |
|---|---|
| Algeria | 28 |
| Australia | 3 |
| Azerbaijan | 2 |
| Bahrain | 4 |
| Belgium | 5 |
| Bosnia | 1 |
| Brazil | 1 |
| Bulgaria | 2 |
| Canada | 2 |
| Cuba | 1 |
| Czech Republic | 4 |
| Egypt | 3 |
| France | 9 |
| Germany | 11 |
| Greece | 38 |
| Indonesia | 12 |
| Ireland | 9 |
| Israel | 4 |
| Italy | 6 |
| Jordan | 30 |
| Kuwait | 18 |
| Lebanon | 3 |
| Republic of Macedonia | 3 |
| Malaysia | 18 |
| Mauritania | 3 |
| Morocco | 7 |
| Netherlands | 2 |
| New Zealand | 1 |
| Norway | 3 |
| Oman | 1 |
| Pakistan | 3 |
| Qatar | 1 |
| Serbia | 2 |
| South Africa | 1 |
| Sweden | 11 |
| Syria | 3 |
| Turkey | 380 |
| United Kingdom | 31 |
| United States | 11 |
| Yemen | 4 |

== Gaza flotilla participants killed in the raid ==
| Name | Nationality | Age | Known for | Ship |
|---|---|---|---|---|
| İbrahim Bilgen | Turkey | 61 | Turkish politician and candidate for mayor of Siirt. | MV Mavi Marmara |
| Çetin Topçuoğlu | Turkey | 53 | Former National level Turkish taekwondo athlete and national coach. Before departing, he left a letter hinting that he expected to die a martyr, and called on others to aspire to a similar death. | MV Mavi Marmara |
| Furkan Doğan | United States | 18 | American of Turkish origin traveling with a US passport, high-school student, living in Turkey. His father says that he only holds American citizenship, contrary to some media reports. | MV Mavi Marmara |
| Cengiz Akyüz | Turkey | 41 | from Iskenderun, port city of southern Turkey. | MV Mavi Marmara |
| Ali Heyder Bengi | Turkey | 39 | a Kurdish man from Diyarbakir, chairman of Aydınlık Yarınlar İçin Hak ve Özgürlükler Eğitim Kültür ve Dayanışma Derneği (AYDER), graduate of Al-Azhar University, owner of a telephone repair shop, married and father of four children. In his funeral in Diyarbakır people shouted "Sehidin Namirin" slogan in Kurdish. His wife said in an interview that he had wanted to reach Palestine for many years, and that he "had an intense desire to die as a shaheed." | MV Mavi Marmara |
| Cevdet Kılıçlar | Turkey | 38 | a journalist born in the central Turkish town of Kayseri, Anatolian said. He was also employed by the İHH in Istanbul. In a recorded statement found aboard the Mavi Marmara, Kılıçlar praised militants in Afghanistan and expressed a desire to meet a "happy ending" like the "shaheeds" killed in Afghanistan. | MV Mavi Marmara |
| Cengiz Songür | Turkey | 47 | from İzmir. He left a will prior to his departure. | MV Mavi Marmara |
| Fahri Yaldız | Turkey | 43 | a firefighter and father of four from the southern town of Adıyaman, Anatolian reported. His brother Habip told the agency that Fahri had long wanted to die fighting in Israel to become a "martyr." Killed by the IDF in the raid. Prior to his departure, he announced that he was going to die as a shaheed. | MV Mavi Marmara |
| Necdet Yıldırım | Turkey | 32 | originally from Malatya, worked for the İHH. | MV Mavi Marmara |

== People on board the raided Gaza flotilla ships, excluding those killed ==
| Name | Nationality | Known for | Ship |
|---|---|---|---|
| Fehmi Bülent Yıldırım | Turkey | İHH president | MV Mavi Marmara |
| Erdinç Tekir | Turkey | An Abkhaz descent Turkish IHH activist and hijacker convicted for the Black Sea hostage crisis. | MV Mavi Marmara |
| Uğur Süleyman Sönmez | Turkey | a 46-year-old Turkish citizen from Ankara, neighbor of Recep Tayyip Erdoğan. Sönmez was shot in the raid. On 23 May 2014, he died in hospital after being in a coma for four years. | MV Mavi Marmara |
| Jerry Campbell | Australia | Australian activist | MV Mavi Marmara |
| Kate Geraghty | Australia | The Sydney Morning Herald photographer | Challenger 1 |
| Paul McGeough | Australia | The Sydney Morning Herald journalist | Challenger 1 |
| Ahmed Talib | Australia | Australian activist | MV Mavi Marmara |
| Maryam Talib | Australia | 19-year-old student of Journalism at Griffith University, Australia. | MV Mavi Marmara |
| Iara Lee | Brazil | Brazilian filmmaker | MV Mavi Marmara |
| Svetoslav Ivanov | Bulgaria | BTV reporter | MV Mavi Marmara |
| Naim Elghandour | Egypt/Greece | Exiled Egyptian with Greek passport, was cook on the Eleftheri Mesogeios | Eleftheri Mesogeios |
| Annette Groth | Germany | Member of the German Bundestag | MV Mavi Marmara |
| Inge Höger | Germany | Member of the German Bundestag | MV Mavi Marmara |
| Norman Paech | Germany | Former member of the German Bundestag | MV Mavi Marmara |
| Haneen Zoubi | Israel | Israeli-Arab member of Knesset, representing the Balad party. She is the first woman to be elected to the Knesset on an Arab party's list. | MV Mavi Marmara |
| Raed Salah | Israel | Leader of the northern branch of the Islamic Movement in Israel, previously convicted by Israeli court for raising money for Hamas | MV Mavi Marmara |
| Wael Saqqa | Jordan | Head of the Jordanian delegation and the ex-president of the Jordanian Engineers Association | MV Mavi Marmara |
| Waleed Al-Tabtabaie | Kuwait | Member of Kuwaiti parliament | MV Mavi Marmara |
| Nadeem Ahmed Khan | Pakistan | Human Rights Activist and Chairman Khubaib Foundation | MV Mavi Marmara |
| Talat Hussain | Pakistan | Journalist and executive director AAJ TV | MV Mavi Marmara |
| Hilarion Capucci | Syria | Retired titular archbishop for the Melkite Greek Catholic Church, previously convicted by an Israeli court of using smuggling arms to the Palestine Liberation Army and sentenced to 12 years in prison. | MV Mavi Marmara |
| Jamal Elshayyal | Qatar | News producer for Al Jazeera English | MV Mavi Marmara |
| Edda Manga | Sweden | Swedish historian | MV Mavi Marmara |
| Henning Mankell | Sweden | Swedish author | Eleftheri Mesogeios |
| Dror Feiler | Sweden | Swedish-Israeli artist | Eleftheri Mesogeios |
| Mattias Gardell | Sweden | Swedish historian | MV Mavi Marmara |
| Mehmet Kaplan | Sweden | Turkish-born member of the Parliament of Sweden | Eleftheri Mesogeios |
| Viktoria Sand | Sweden | Swedish physician | Eleftheri Mesogeios |
| Hakan Albayrak | Turkey | Turkish journalist | MV Mavi Marmara |
| Sinan Albayrak | Turkey | Turkish actor | MV Mavi Marmara |
| Elif Akkuş | Turkey | Turkish television journalist reporting the Flotilla raid for TRT | MV Mavi Marmara |
| Mediha Olgun | Turkey | Turkish journalist and author of the book, "Mavi Marmara'da ne oldu" on Gaza Flotilla raid | MV Mavi Marmara |
| Ya'akov Bolinet Alniak | Turkey | Wrote a book about the raid, joined the Islamic State of Iraq and the Levant army and was killed in American airstrikes on ISIS in September 2014. | MV Mavi Marmara |
| Hassan Ghani | United Kingdom | Scottish journalist and documentary maker Press TV reporter | MV Mavi Marmara |
| Theresa McDermott | United Kingdom | Scottish activist found in Ramleh prison four days after an attempted Gaza aid mission in 2009 | Challenger 1 |
| Ismail Patel | United Kingdom | Friends of Al-Aqsa | MV Mavi Marmara |
| Fatimah Mahmadi | United States | Member of the organization Viva Palestina which the IDF claims attempted to smuggle forbidden electronic components into the Gaza Strip. | MV Mavi Marmara |
| Huwaida Arraf | United States | Co-founder of the International Solidarity Movement | Challenger 1 |
| Joe Meadors | United States | A survivor of the USS Liberty incident | Sfendoni |
| Kenneth O'Keefe | United States and United Kingdom | Former U.S. Marine and currently a peace and justice activist. The Israeli Defense Force (IDF) claimed that O'Keefe was linked to terrorist organizations, that he was an extremist who whose goal was to reach Gaza in order to help train and establish Hamas commando units. | MV Mavi Marmara |
| Edward Peck | United States | Former U.S. Ambassador to Iraq and Mauritania | Sfendoni |
| Ann Wright | United States | Former U.S. Army colonel and former US diplomat. In 2003 she resigned her State Department post to protest the war in Iraq | Challenger 1 |
| Scott Hamann | United States | Video producer | Challenger 1 |
| Petr Zavadil | Czech Republic | Czech TV reporter | Sfendoni |
| Jan Línek | Czech Republic | Czech TV cameraman | Sfendoni |
| Mario Damolin | Germany | German journalist and author | Eleftheri Mesogeios |
| Matthias Jochheim | Germany | German IPPW representative | MV Mavi Marmara |
| Nadel El Sakka | Germany | Representative of the Palestinian community in Germany | MV Mavi Marmara |
| Aris Chatzistefanou | Greece | Skai 100.3 journalist | MV Mavi Marmara |
| Michalis Grigoropoulos | Greece | Greek activist | Eleftheri Mesogeios | |
| Katerina Kitidi | Greece | TVXS.gr news website journalist | Sfendoni |
| Manolis Matchioulakis | Greece | Solar energy expert from Athens | |
| Aris Papadokostopoulos | Greece | Captain of the Eleftheri Mesogeios | Eleftheri Mesogeios |
| Vangelis Pissias | Greece | Sixty-three-year-old professor of water engineering at Technical University of Athens | Eleftheri Mesogeios |
| Maria Psara | Greece | Ethnos (see List of Greek newspapers) journalist | MV Mavi Marmara |
| Giorgos Klontzas | Greece | professional diver and pilot | Challenger 2 |
| Zaharias Stilianakis | Greece | Captain of the Eleftheri Mesogeios | Eleftheri Mesogeios |
| Abbas Nasser | Lebanon | Aljazeera news journalist | MV Mavi Marmara |
| Lubna Masarwa | State of Palestine | activist | MV Mavi Marmara |
| Ewa Jasiewicz | Poland | activist and freelance journalist | Challenger 1 |
| Yasser Muhammad Sabag | Syria, Bosnia | According to Serbian news sources, a Syrian intelligence officer serving as the liaison officer between Damascus and Tehran's intelligence networks in the Balkans. In the past, Sabag was in charge of intelligence in the Abu Nidal militant organization. | MV Mavi Marmara |
| Srđan Stojiljković | Serbia | Serbian Cameraman | MV Mavi Marmara |
| Sümeyye Ertekin | Turkey | Turkish journalist | MV Mavi Marmara |
| Ayşe Sarıoğlu | Turkey | Turkish journalist, joined Flotilla Free Media after the Gaza flotilla raid | MV Mavi Marmara |
| Mustafa Özcan | Turkey | Turkish journalist | MV Mavi Marmara |
| Ümit Sönmez | Turkey | Turkish journalist | MV Mavi Marmara |
| Murat Palavar | Turkey | Turkish journalist | MV Mavi Marmara |
| Ali Ekber Yaratılmış | Turkey | Former Turkish taekwondo athlete and national referee. He was wounded in the raid but not dead contrary to the Israeli sources' claim. | MV Mavi Marmara |
| Çigdem Topçuoğlu | Turkey | wife of Çetin Topçuoglu, was also aboard the Mavi Marmara, but survived | MV Mavi Marmara |
| Ahmet Varol | Turkey | Journalist and author | MV Mavi Marmara |
| Ibrahim Sediyani | Turkey | Journalist and author | MV Mavi Marmara |
| Rıdvan Kaya | Turkey | Author | MV Mavi Marmara |
| Ramazan Kayan | Turkey | Author | MV Mavi Marmara |
| Abbas Al Lawati | Oman | Dubai-based Gulf News journalist | MV Mavi Marmara |
| Bilal Abdul Aziz | Italy | English teacher of Great Britain | |
| Alex Harrison | United Kingdom | a 31-year-old British woman | Challenger 1 |
| Kevin Ovenden | United Kingdom | Viva Palestina charity | MV Mavi Marmara |
| Parveen Yaqub | United Kingdom | 39, from Huddersfield, a council worker | MV Mavi Marmara. |
| Denis Healey | United Kingdom | captain of Challenger 1, skippered one of the previous flotillas | Challenger 1 |
| Gehad Sukker | United Kingdom | a pizza shop manager from Altrincham in Cheshire | MV Mavi Marmara |
| David Schermerhorn | United States | 80, an American film producer | Challenger 1 |
| Gene St. Onge | United States | Oakland, CA-based civil/structural engineer, who is working with Palestinian engineers to rebuild housing destroyed in Israel's 2009 invasion of Gaza | Sfendoni |
| Paul Larudee | United States | El Cerrito, CA, a piano tuner and FPM co-founder, who also co-founded The Free Gaza Movement, the movement that first broke the siege of Gaza in 2008 | Sfendoni |
| Janet Kobren | United States | American Jewish, retired math teacher and co-founder of the California-based Free Palestine Movement | Sfendoni |
| Kathy Sheetz | United States | a retired nurse from Richmond, CA, and Woods Hole, MA | Challenger 1 |
| Khalid Turaani | United States | who was founder and executive director of the former American Muslims for Jerusalem and now lives in Dubai. | MV Mavi Marmara |
| Nicola Enchmarch | New Zealand | Humanitarian Aid Worker | MV Mavi Marmara |
| Amin Abu Rashid | Netherlands | He is considered by Israeli intelligence to be the chief Hamas fundraiser in Western Europe, and allegedly had close ties with the senior Hamas commander Mahmoud al-Mabhouh. According to the IHH publications, he lost his hand "in the struggle against the occupation". In interviews, he declared that he was planning to confront the IDF soldiers. | MV Mavi Marmara |
| Valentin Vassilev | Bulgaria | BTV cameraman | MV Mavi Marmara |
| Shane Dillon | Ireland | Crew | Challenger 1 |
| Fintan Lane | Ireland | Irish historian and activist | Challenger 1 |
| Fiachra O Luain | Ireland | Activist | Challenger 1 |
| Ahmad Umimon | France | Alleged by the IDF to be an operative of Hamas | MV Mavi Marmara |
| Marcello Faraggi | Italy | Italian journalist from Brussels | Eleftheri Mesogeios |
| Noorazman Mohd Samsuddin | Malaysia | Malaysia's Haluan Palestin chairperson | MV Mavi Marmara |
| Mohd Arba'ai Shawal | Malaysia | Malaysia's Haluan Palestin activist | MV Mavi Marmara |
| Syed Muhammad Haleem Syed Hassan | Malaysia | Malaysia's Haluan Palestin activist | MV Mavi Marmara |
| Al Hami Husain Suhaimi | Malaysia | Malaysia's Haluan Palestin activist | MV Mavi Marmara |
| Mohd Nizam Mohd Awang | Malaysia | Malaysia's Haluan Palestin activist | MV Mavi Marmara |
| Hasanuddin Mohd Yunus | Malaysia | Malaysia's Aqsa Syarif president | MV Mavi Marmara |
| Selamat Aliman | Malaysia | Malaysia's Aqsa Syarif treasurer | MV Mavi Marmara |
| Jamuliddin Elias | Malaysia | Yayasan Amal Malaysia deputy president | MV Mavi Marmara |
| Abdul Halim Mohd Redzuan | Malaysia | Muslim Care Malaysia activist | MV Mavi Marmara |
| Mustafa Mansur | Malaysia | representative of Malaysia Consultative Council of Islamic Organisation (MAPIM) | MV Mavi Marmara |
| Ashwad Ismail | Malaysia | Malaysia's Astro Awani journalist | MV Mavi Marmara |
| Shamsul Kamal Latif | Malaysia | Malaysia's Astro Awani cameraman | MV Mavi Marmara |

== MV Rachel Corrie Passengers ==
Some people who were on board MV Rachel Corrie are:

| Name | Nationality | Known for |
|---|---|---|
| Mairead Corrigan | United Kingdom | Nobel Peace Prize laureate |
| Denis Halliday | Ireland | UN Assistant Secretary-General |
| Derek Graham | Ireland | Human rights activist now living in Gaza |
| Jenny Graham | Ireland | Human rights activist now living in Gaza |
| Mohd Nizar Zakaria | Malaysia | member of Parliament of Malaysia |
| Shamsul Akmar Musa Kamal | Malaysia | Perdana Global Peace Organisation member |
| Matthias Chang | Malaysia | Perdana Global Peace Organisation member |
| Ahmad Faizal Azumu | Malaysia | Perdana Global Peace Organisation member |
| Halim Mohamed | Malaysia | Malaysia's TV3 journalist |
| Mohd Jufri Judin | Malaysia | Malaysia's TV3 cameraman |

== See also ==
- Gaza journey of MV Rachel Corrie
- List of participants of Freedom Flotilla II
- List of participants of the Global Sumud Flotilla
