= List of participants of the 2025 Global Sumud Flotilla =

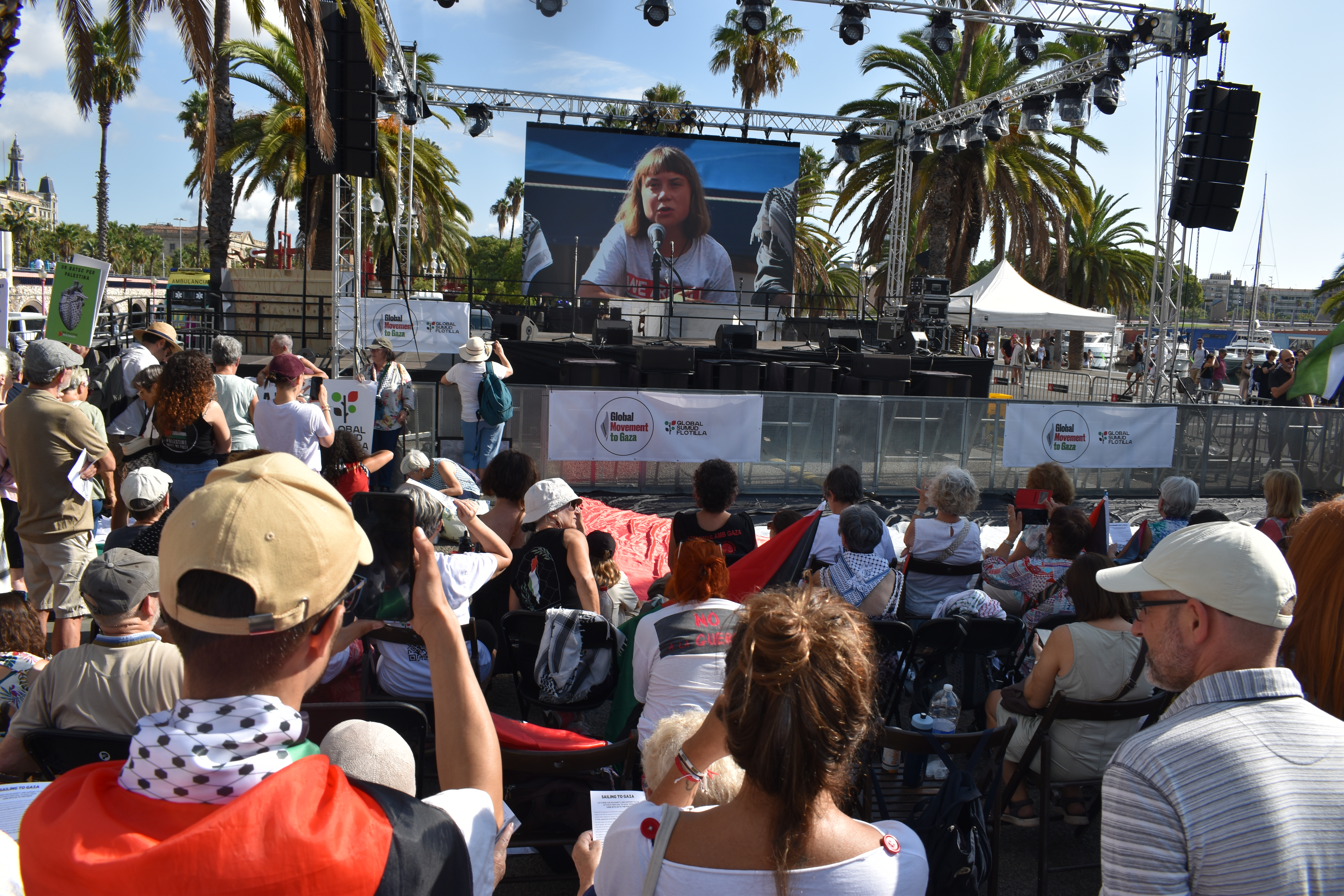
Greta Thunberg, a member of the steering committee, addressing supporters of the flotilla convoy in Barcelona, 31 August 2025

The 2025 Global Sumud Flotilla consisted of 500 participants on more than 40 ships from more than 44 countries, making it the largest civilian-led convoy of its kind in history.

== Organizers and steering committee ==
Member	Notes
Greta Thunberg	Swedish climate activist, resigned on or before September 17, 2025
Ada Colau	former Mayor of Barcelona
Mariana Mortágua	Portuguese Left Bloc parliamentarian
Bruno Gilga	Brazilian activist (Movimento Revolucionário de Trabalhadores)
Susan Sarandon	American actress and activist
Mandla Mandela	Grandson of Nelson Mandela
Thiago Ávila	Brazilian activist, member of the steering committee
Kleoniki Alexopoulou	Greek historian, member of the steering committee
Nadir Al-Nuri	Malaysian activist, member of the steering committee

== Number of participants per country ==
Unless otherwise indicated, the numbers are from the website of the Global Sumud Flotilla:

Nationality	No. of participants
Turkey	50
Spain	49
Italy	45
France	34
Tunisia	34
Greece	28
Malaysia	23
United States	22
Switzerland	19
Algeria	17
Ireland	16
Brazil	15
Germany	15
United Kingdom	13
Netherlands	10
Sweden	9
Australia	6
Pakistan	6
Mexico	6
Norway	6
South Africa	6
Finland	5
Morocco	5 (Note: The Global Sumud Flotilla lists 6 Moroccans, but one of them, Yassine Benjelloun, is listed elsewhere as French, and says in the video that he is French. He is therefore counted in this table as French.)
Poland	4
Portugal	4
Austria	4
Belgium	4
Argentina	3
Kuwait	3
New Zealand	3
Bahrain	2
Colombia	2
Uruguay	2
Bangladesh	1
Bulgaria	1
Czech Republic	1
Denmark	1
Japan	1
Lithuania	1
Luxembourg	1
Mauritania	1
Oman	1
Serbia	1
Slovakia	1
Total	~500

== Participants by nationality ==
All of the flotilla volunteers were released from Israeli custody as of 12 October 2025.

Country	Name	Notes	Vessel	Ref
Argentina	Maria Celeste Fierro	Buenos Aires legislator	Adara	
Argentina	Carlos Antonio Bertola		Estrella	
Argentina	Jorge Ezequiel Peressini	Córdoba deputy	Sirius	
Australia	Bianca Pullman		Florida	
Australia	Surya McEwen	activist	Miamia	
Australia	Abubakir Rafiq		Spectre	
Australia	Hamish Paterson		Wahoo	
Australia	Juliet Lamont	Documentary filmmaker	Wahoo	
Austria	Julian Scheutter		Seulle	
Austria	Erol Buyuk		Grande Blu	
Austria	Maria-Sophie Hehle		Free Willy	
Austria	Ashraf Abdelrahman		Maria Cristina	
Bahrain	Mohamed Abdulla Mohamed Husain Mohamed		Yulara	
Bahrain	Sami Abulaziz Hasan Ebrahim		Meteque	
Bangladesh	Shahidul Alam	Photojournalist		
Belgium	Navid Lari		Catalina	
Belgium	Saddie Choua		Estrella	
Belgium	Alexis Deswaef		Jeannot III	
Belgium	Latifa Khlifi		Spectre	
Brazil	Thiago Ávila	activist, steering committee member	Alma	
Brazil	Mariana Conti	City councilor (Campinas, São Paulo), participant	Sirius	
Brazil	Bruno Gilga Rocha	coordinator / spokesperson of Brazilian delegation	Sirius	
Brazil	Lucas Farias Gusmão	activist / delegation member	Yulara	
Brazil	João Aguiar	activist	Mikeno	
Brazil	Mohamad El Kadri	activist	Spectre	
Brazil	Magno Carvalho Costa	activist	Sirius	
Brazil	Ariadne Telles	participant	Adara	
Brazil	Lisiane Proença	activist	Sirius	
Brazil	Carina Faggiani	participant		
Brazil	Victor Nascimento Peixoto	delegation member	Adara	
Brazil	Giovanna Vial	participant		
Brazil	Luizianne Lins	federal lawmaker	Grande Blu	
Brazil	Miguel Bastos Viveiros De Castro		Catalina	
Brazil	Gabrielle da Silva Tolotti	president of PSOL-RS	Spectre	
Bulgaria	Vasil Dimitrov		Grande Blu	
Colombia	Manuela Bedoya	Activist		
Colombia	Luna Barreto	Activist		
Croatia	Morana Miljanović		Shireen	
Czech Republic	Sarka Prikylova		Aurora	
Denmark	Julia Nina Petersen		Nina	
Finland	Shifa Abdi		Florida	
Finland	Kata-Riina Tikka		Inana	
Finland	Iida-Liina Hakkinen		Ohwayla	
Finland	Kaba Assefa		Shireen	
Finland	Juho Henrik Pirhonen		Sirius	
France	Adèle Haenel	Actress & activist		
France	Emma Fourreau	Member of European Parliament/activist		
France	Fiona Mischel			
France	François Piquemal	Deputy of France Insoumise		
France	Rima Hassan	Member of European Parliament		
France	Yassine Benjelloun (Note: The Global Sumud Flotilla lists him as Moroccan, but in the video he says (in French) that he is French. TRT World lists him as French.)			
Germany	Yasemin Acar	Activist		
Germany	Judith Scheytt	Activist		
Germany	Enissa Amani	Comedian and activist		
Greece	Evangelos Apostolakis			
Greece	Georgios Apostolopoulos			
Greece	Kleoniki Giannakitsa			
Greece	Maria Dipla			
Greece	Ploutarchos Vergis			
Greece	Theopisti Perka			
Greece	Vasieleios Rongas			
Ireland	Chris Andrews	senator for Sinn Féin	Spectre	
Ireland	Liam Cunningham	Actor		
Ireland	Naoise Dolan	novelist		
Ireland	Tadhg Hickey	Comedian	Meteque	
Ireland	Colm Byrne		Hio	
Ireland	Cormac O'Daly		Yulara	
Ireland	Tara O'Grady		Alma	
Ireland	Caitríona Graham		Aurora	
Ireland	Louise Heaney		Dir Yassine	
Ireland	Thomas McCune		Sirius	
Ireland	Dairmuod Mac Dubhghlais		Sirius	
Ireland	Sarah Clancy		Spectre	
Ireland	Donna Marie Schwarz	Trade unionist and member of Fórsa	Amsterdam	
Ireland	Patrick O’Donovan		Fair Lady	
Ireland	Mary Almai (Maureen)		Paola I	
Ireland	Tara Rose Sheehy		Ohwayla	
Italy	Marco Croatti	Senator Five Star Movement		
Italy	Benedetta Scuderi	MEP (Green/Left Alliance)		
Italy	Arturo Scotto	Deputy (PD)		
Italy	Annalisa Corrado	MEP		
Italy	Fabrizio De Luca			‌
Italy	Paolo De Montis			‌
Italy	Ruggero Zeni			‌
Italy	Silvia Severini			‌
Italy	Barbara Schiavulli			‌
Italy	Carlo Biasioli			
Italy	Jose Nivoi			‌
Italy	Lorenzo D'Agostino			
Italy	Emanuela Pala			‌
Italy	Luca Poggi			‌
Italy	Adriano Veneziani			‌
Italy	Alessandro Mantovani			‌
Italy	Cesare Tofani			‌
Italy	Dario Crippa			‌
Italy	Giorgio Patti			‌
Italy	Pietro Queirolo Palmas			
Italy	Manuel Pietrangeli			‌
Italy	Antonio La Piccirella			
Japan	Mikako Yasumura		Meteque	
Jordan	Abdulla Ghabbash		Alma	
Jordan	Samia Abdallah		Sirius	
Jordan	Abdel Rahman Ghazal		Spectre	
Kuwait	Mohammad Jamal		Allakatalla (Pseudonym:Yafa)	
Kuwait	Abdullah Al Mutawa		Spectre	
Kuwait	Khalid Alabduljader		Spectre	
Libya	Omar al-Hassi	Former Libyan prime minister		
Lithuania	Aleksandras Chichlovskis		Catalina	
Luxembourg	Nora Rosa Huberty		Miamia	
Malaysia	Nadir Al-Nuri	Steering committee member, Director-General of Sumud Nusantara / organiser from "Cinta Gaza Malaysia"	Jong	
Malaysia	Zainal Rashid Ahmad	Journalist and author	Fair Lady	
Malaysia	Zizi Kirana	Singer	Huga	
Malaysia	Serieffa Mushtafa Albakry	Journalist from TV Alhijrah	Jong	
Malaysia	Mazian Seman	Camerawoman from TV Alhijrah	Jong	
Malaysia	Ariff Budiman		Jong	
Malaysia	Rahmat Ikhsan		Estrella	
Malaysia	Nurhelmi Ghani		Estrella	
Malaysia	Asmawi Mokhtar		Estrella	
Malaysia	Norazman Ishak		Estrella	
Malaysia	Muhammad Abdullah (Ustaz Mad Kechik)		Fair Lady	
Malaysia	Musa Nuwayri		Alma	
Malaysia	Iylia Balqis		Alma	
Malaysia	Sul Aidil		Alma	
Malaysia	Ardell Aryana		Mikeno	
Malaysia	Razali Awang		Inana	
Malaysia	Haikal Abdullah		Sirius	
Malaysia	Muaz Zainal Abiddin		Sirius	
Malaysia	Zulfadhli Khairudin		Sirius	
Malaysia	Rusydi Ramli		Sirius	
Malaysia	Danish Nazram		Grande Blu	
Malaysia	Farah Lee		Grande Blu	
Malaysia	Muhammad Hareez Adzrami (Haroqs)		Free Willy	
Malaysia	Dr. Taufiq Razif		Free Willy	
Malaysia	Haikal Zulkefli		Free Willy	
Malaysia	Heliza Helmi		Hio	
Malaysia	Hazwani Helmi		Hio	
Mauritania	Mohamed Vall Mohmeden		Dir Yassine (Mali)	
Mexico	Ernesto Ledesma	Journalist	Ohwayla	
Mexico	Sol González Eguia	Psychologist	Adara	
Mexico	Carlos Pérez Osorio	Film director	Hio	
Mexico	Arlin Medrano	Journalist	Adara	
Mexico	Diego Vázquez	Artist	Fair Lady	
Mexico	Laura Vélez	Biomedical engineer	Wahoo	
Mexico	Mirian Moreno Sánchez	Geoscientist	Shireen	
New Zealand	Rana Hamida			
New Zealand	Youssef Sammour			
New Zealand	Samuel Leason			
Norway	Eline Norli			
Oman	Omama Mustafa al Lawati			
Pakistan	Mushtaq Ahmad Khan	Former Senator of Pakistan	Allakatalla (Pseudonym:Yafa)	
Pakistan	Syed Uzair Nizami	activist (outsmart IDF arrest/escaped)		
Pakistan	Mazhar Saeed Shah	AJK information minister (Return halfway due to boat technical failure)		
Poland	Omar Faris	Leader, Socio-Cultural Association of Polish Palestinians		
Poland	Franciszek Sterczewski	Polish member of parliament		
Poland	Ewa Jasiewicz	Polish-British citizen, journalist		
Poland	Nina Ptak	Head of the Nomada non-governmental organisation. On 4 October 2025 it was reported that Ptak had begun a hunger strike while in Israeli custody.		
Portugal	Mariana Mortágua	economist and politician		
Portugal	Miguel Duarte			
Portugal	Sofia Aparício	actress		
Serbia	Ognjen Marković	FLU student	Adara	
Slovakia	Peter Švestka			
South Africa	Mandla Mandela	grandson of Nelson Mandela	Alma	
South Africa	Fatima Hendricks		Amsterdam	
South Africa	Zaheera Soomar		Fair Lady	
South Africa	Reaaz Moola		Florida	
South Africa	Zukiswa Wanner		Florida	
South Africa	Carolyn Amanda Shelver		Wahoo	
Spain	Ada Colau	former Mayor of Barcelona/organizer & participant	Sirius	
Spain	Pilar Castillejo	Deputy in the Parliament of Catalonia	Adara	
Spain	Saturnino Mercader	Syndicalist	Adara	
Spain	Serigne Mbayé	Activist, former deputy in the Assembly of Madrid	Sirius	
Spain	Celia Vélez Lucena	teacher, naval engineer	Sirius	
Spain	Simón Francisco Vidal Ferrandis	sailor	Sirius	
Spain	Itziar Moreno Martínez		Sirius	
Spain	Jose Javier Oses Carrasco		Sirius	
Spain	Juan Bordera Romá	deputy in the Parliament of the Valencian Community	Sirius	
Spain	Luay Al Bacha Al Farra	photographer, filmmaker	Sirius	
Spain	Manuel García Morales	journalist	Sirius	
Spain	Sofía Bucho Lahuerta	teacher, social worker	Sirius	
Spain	Sandra Garrido	lawyer	Sirius	
Spain	Alonso Quintero Boza	journalist of al-Jazeera	Alma	
Spain	Francesc Jofra Carrasco	energy consultant	Alma	
Spain	Gulcin Bekar Basaran	Videographer, filmmaker	Alma	
Spain	Laia Rosell Sancho	activist	Alma	
Spain	Adrià Plazas Vidal	physicist, activist	Adara	
Spain	Ana María Alcalde Callejas	social worker, influencer	Adara	
Spain	Ariadna Masmitjà Marín	activist, teacher	Adara	
Spain	Eduard Lucas Camacho	syndicalist	Adara	
Spain	Francisco Rodríguez Martínez	syndicalist	Adara	
Spain	Jordi Coronas Martorell	Barcelona city councillor	Adara	
Spain	Nestor Prieto Amador	journalist	Adara	
Spain	Nicole Montserrat Leon Avilés	artist	Adara	
Spain	Reyes Rigo Cervilla	acupuncture therapist	Adara	
Spain	Carles Lleó Paulo Noguera	sailor	Aurora	
Spain	Lucía Muñoz Dalda	former deputy in the Congress of Deputies, town councillor	Huga	
Spain	Alejandra Martínez Velasco	jurist	Huga	
Spain	Alicia Amparo Armesto Núñez	journalist	Huga	
Spain	Carlos Barron García	journalist from El País	Captain Nikos	
Spain	Ana María Martín López	journalist, professor	Jeannot III	
Spain	Rafael Borrego Peña	lawyer	Jeannot III	
Spain	Manuel López Calvo	sailor	Meteke	
Spain	José Luis Ybot	activist, sound technician	Meteke	
Spain	Abdel Karim El Khamlichi Mohamed		Meteke	
Spain	Goretti Sarasibar	sailor	Estrella y Manuel	
Spain	Santiago Oliver		Estrella y Manuel	
Spain	Sofía Peris Sánchez		Estrella y Manuel	
Spain	Eva Nistal		Catalina	
Spain	Marta Mallach		Catalina	
Spain	Guillem Esteban Valera		Catalina	
Spain	Juan Carlos de la Rubia Panos		Catalina	
Spain	Lluis de Moner Maians		Inana	
Spain	Jesús Manuel Alonso Valera	activist	Inana	
Spain	Daniel Masso Roca		Inana	
Spain	Miguel Zuluaga Uriarte		Inana	
Spain	Anna Ruiz Bernardos		Selvaggia	
Spain	Jimena González	deputy in the Assembly of Madrid, trans activist		
Sweden	Lorena Delgado Varas	Member of the Riksdag	Huga	
Sweden	Greta Thunberg	climate activist/steering committee member		
Sweden	Gustaf Skarsgård	Swedish actor		
Sweden	Irana Wilson			‌
Switzerland	Clément Froidevaux			
Switzerland	Jeremy Chevalley			
Switzerland	Marc Formosa			
Switzerland	Mehmet Türkkan			
Switzerland	Lionel Simonin			
Switzerland	Rahim Mercan			
Switzerland	Stéphane Amiguet			
Switzerland	Tabea Zaugg			
Tunisia	Houssameddine bin Taher			
Turkey	Sema Silkin Ün	Member of Parliament (Future Party, Denizli)		
Turkey	Mehmet Atmaca	Member of Parliament (HÜDA PAR)		
Turkey	Necmettin Çalışkan	Member of Parliament (Felicity Party)		
Turkey	Faruk Dinç	Member of Parliament (HÜDA PAR, Mersin)		
Turkey	Aycin Kantoglu	translator & activist, civil society representative		
Turkey	Ikbal Gurpinar	TV presenter, producer & writer		
Turkey	Abdulsamed Turan			‌
Turkey	Hasmet Yazici			‌
Turkey	Yasar Yavuz			‌
Turkey	Ersin Celik			‌
Turkey	Semanur Yaman			‌
Turkey	Halil Canakci			‌
United Kingdom	Hannah Sharpey-Schafer		Hio	‌
United Kingdom	Jim Hickey		Seulle	
United Kingdom	Sid Khan		Seulle	
United Kingdom	Margaret Pancetta		Seulle	
United Kingdom	Yvonne Ridley		Omar al-Mukhtar	
United States	David Adler	General, Progressive International	Ohwayla	
United States	Carson Amanda Blanton		Paola I	
United States	Jessica Kaye Clotfelter	Veteran, United States Marine Corps	Ohwayla	
United States	Alex Colston	Editor, Drop Site News		
United States	Susan Jernstedt	Veteran, United States Army	Ohwayla	
United States	Chris O'Moore	former Greek-Orthodox priest, musician, artist	-	
United States	Zuleyka Morales Rivera	Veteran, United States Marine Corps	Ohwayla	
United States	Greg Stoker	Veteran, United States Army	Ohwayla	
United States	Philip Tottenham	Veteran, United States Marine Corps	Ohwayla	
United States	Emily Wilder	Reporter, Jewish Currents	The Conscious	
Uruguay	Ana Zugarramurdi Garcia		Jeannot III	
Uruguay	Rodrigo Andres Ciz Mendez		Maria Cristina	

== See also ==
- List of participants in the 2010 Gaza Freedom Flotilla
- List of participants of Freedom Flotilla II
