= Gaza Freedom Flotilla (disambiguation) =

Gaza Freedom Flotilla or simply Gaza Flotilla may refer to:

- 2010 Gaza Freedom Flotilla, intercepted by Israel, 9 of the participants were killed by Israel
  - List of participants of the Gaza flotilla
  - 2010 Gaza flotilla raid, Israeli raid on the flotilla
- Freedom Flotilla II, planned for July 2011 but was unsuccessful
  - List of participants of Freedom Flotilla II
- Freedom Flotilla III, intercepted in 2015
- 2018 Gaza Freedom Flotilla, boarded and seized by the Israeli Navy
- 2024 Gaza Freedom Flotilla, planned for April 2024 but never sailed
- May 2025 drone attack on Gaza Freedom Flotilla, suspected to be by Israel
- June 2025 Gaza Freedom Flotilla, set sail on 1st June 2025, intercepted by Israel
- July 2025 Gaza Freedom Flotilla, set sail on 13 July 2025, intercepted by Israel
- Global Sumud Flotilla, setting sail between 30 August and 4 September 2025

== See also ==
- Freedom Flotilla Coalition, organizer of most of the above flotillas
  - Ship to Gaza (Sweden), Swedish organization co-founder of the Freedom Flotilla Coalition
- Free Gaza Movement sailings of August 2008 and October 2008, December 2008 to February 2009 sailings, June 2009 sailing
- Jewish Boat to Gaza (2010)
- Road to Hope (2010)
- Women's Boat to Gaza (2016)
