= Serigne Mbaye =

Serigne Mbaye may refer to:

- Serigne Mbayé (politician) (born 1975), Senegalese and Spanish politician
- Serigne Mbaye (footballer) (born 1996), Senegalese footballer
