= Hanaa Al-Ramli =

Jordanian-Palestinian engineer

- هناء الرملي
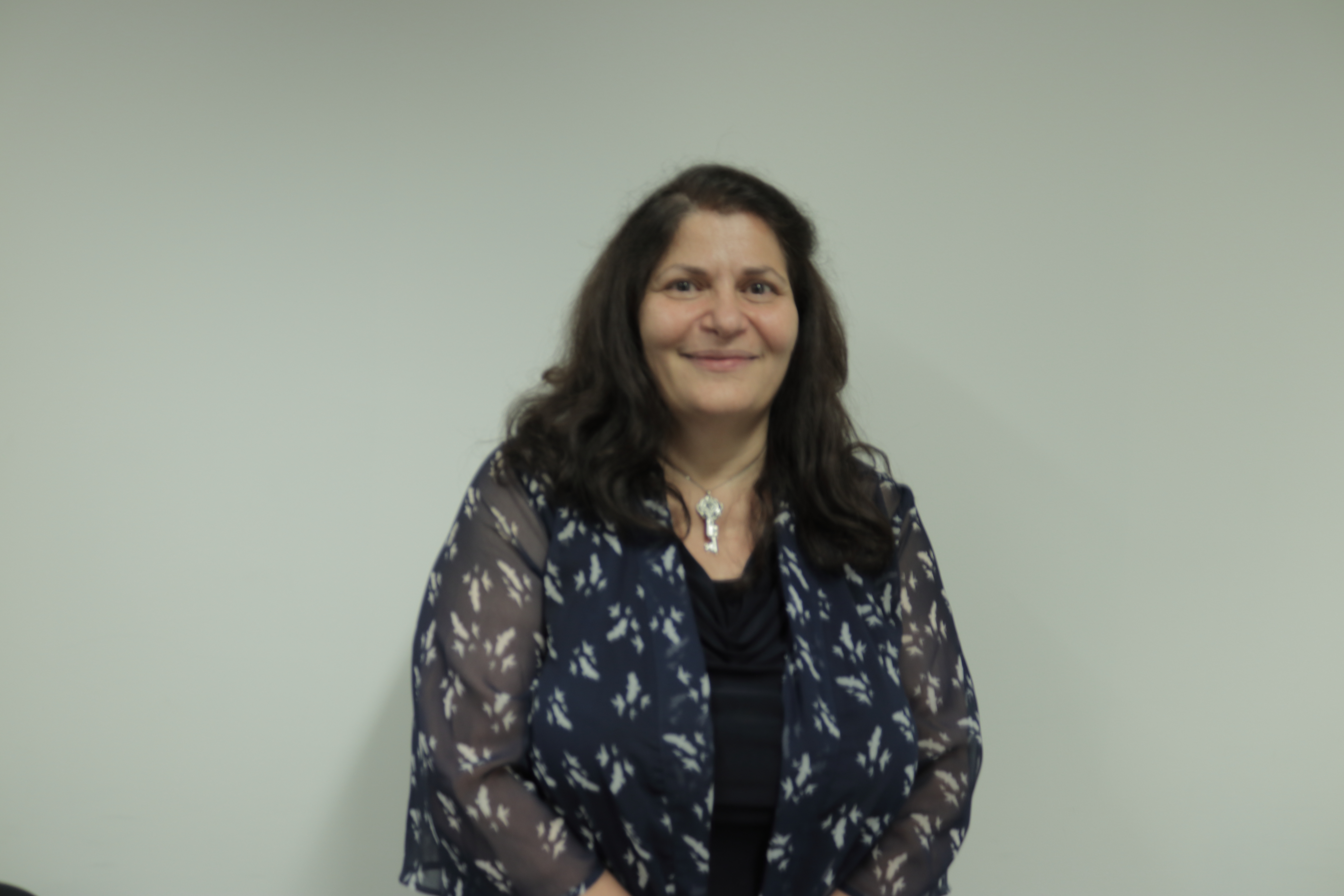
- Born: October 7, 1961 (age 64); Jeddah
- Occupations: Engineer, writer, researcher, lecturer and activist

Hanaa Al-Ramli (Arabic: هناء الرملي; born October 7, 1961) is a Jordanian-Palestinian engineer, writer, researcher, lecturer and activist in Information technology and Internet culture field. She is a consultant in the field of Internet culture education for a number of media channels, radio stations, newspapers and specialized websites.

In 2015, Hanaa wrote Abtal Al-Internet book, which talking about the advantages of the Internet, and then talking about its dangers and disadvantages, and provides guidance and advice for young people, enabling them to protect themselves from cyberharassment and sexually harassed through the Internet.

== Biography ==
On October 7, 1961, Hana was born in Jeddah, Saudi Arabia, to a Palestinian father (Salah al-Din al-Ramli) and a Syrian mother (Nadia Haj Qassem) displaced from the city of Jaffa in Palestine following the 1948 Nakba. Hana graduated from the Civil Engineering Department of Tishreen University in 1983. Hana moved with her family to reside in many Arab countries, and she currently lives between Amman in Jordan and Montreal in Canada.

Hana is considered one of the first Arab writers to have published their articles and thoughts in the Arabic language since 1996 on the Naseej website. She has also published many articles specializing in information technology on several technology websites and Arab and Canadian newspapers since 1996. Hana is considered one of the first women who designed Arab websites that provide public services to users since the beginnings of the Internet. She created the Hana Net Cards website in 2000, and the Palestinian cartoonist Naji Al-Ali's website in 2002.

In 2005, Hana won the Creative Women Award at the Jordanian Engineers Association. In 2007, Hana directed the movie "The Icon," which discusses Handala. This film was shown in many countries, and in 2013 she obtained Hana received an appreciation award and the title of "life changer" from Save the Children. The Swedish Diakonia Foundation and the Swedish media gave her the title of "The Woman Who Fights Poverty with Books" in the same year.

In 2013, Hana was recognized as the most inspiring success story in the world in the field of encouraging reading for her initiative entitled "My Book is Your Book" [20]. As a result, she was a guest speaker on the industry in several lectures in Sweden and at the Gothenburg International Fair for the book. [21] In 2014, Facebook chose her as a social activist and the owner of a significant success story in using Facebook in community work and activating community initiatives. She was also selected to participate in a dialogue between the management of Facebook and Pakistani activist Malala Yousafzai.

Hana also worked on many initiatives, projects, and awareness campaigns in Internet culture. In 2004, she launched the "Community Internet Culture" program to raise awareness of the best ways for the conscious, responsible and civilized use of Internet users of all ages. In 2012 she worked on a project, "The Internet's Sun - Birds of the Sun," which aims to rehabilitate orphaned girls in refugee camps by developing their skills and hobbies and using the Internet as a media platform to convey their voice to the world.

Since 2013, Hana has been working in the field of Internet culture in the "Digital" program on Radio Monte Carlo International, and in 2014 she gave a series of lectures in the Amman Municipality and its centers entitled "The Internet and the Family - More Advantages Fewer Risks."

In 2015, Hana worked on the "Internet Generation, Trust, and Safety" project, which aims to educate children and young people about ways to protect against cyberbullying and online sexual harassment. During the same year, she worked on the "Internet Generation Without Borders" project.
