= Wael Saqqa =

Wael Saqqa (born 22 August 1958) is a Jordanian architect, and Chairman of the Jordan Engineering Association. He is the secretary general of Jordanian Islamic Action Front (IAF).

== Career ==
The Jordan Engineers Association (JEA) established an "international commission" to help rebuild Gaza. A JEA delegation assessed the situation in Gaza.

He is on the Industry advisory board, of the German-Jordanian University. He commented on Royal Dutch Shell planned extraction of oil from oil shale, and water supplies in Jordan.

He is Chairman of the Board of Almehanya Real Estate Investments.

== Gaza flotilla ==
He was one of fifteen Jordanians who were passengers during the 2010 Gaza flotilla raid.
