= List of participants of Freedom Flotilla II =

The Freedom Flotilla II participants had planned to sail on 5 July 2011, but did not. Fewer than a few dozen people were believed to be planning to participate in the flotilla as of 7 July, though initial reports had suggested as many as 1,000 from 22 nations could be involved.

== Organizers ==
- Huwaida Arraf, co-founder of International Solidarity Movement.
- Medea Benjamin, co-founder of Code Pink.
- Amin Abu Rashid, Dutch Palestinian activist reported to be a member of the Al-Aqsa Foundation in Rotterdam.
- Adam Shapiro, co-founder of International Solidarity Movement.

== Notable participants ==
- Chris Andrews, former Fianna Fáil TD; also prevented from taking part in the 2010 Gaza Freedom Flotilla.
- Felim Egan, artist and member of Aosdána; won the 1993 UNESCO prize in Paris, and the 1995 Premiere Prize at Cagnes-sur-Mer.
- Amira Hass, Israeli journalist for Haaretz, Israel's oldest daily newspaper.
- Trevor Hogan, former Irish international rugby player.
- Gerry MacLochlainn, Sinn Féin Councillor in Derry. In 2009, led 2nd convoy into Gaza and co-founded Derry Friends of Palestine. He is a member of the International Steering Committee of Freedom Flotilla 2 – Stay Human and of the Irish Ship to Gaza national committee.
- Henning Mankell, Swedish author who, after participating in the 2010 Gaza Freedom Flotilla aboard the MS Sofia (which was stormed by Israeli troops) and being deported to Sweden, subsequently called for global sanctions against Israel.
- Paul Murphy, Socialist Party, Member of the European Parliament for the Dublin constituency.
- Alice Walker, author, announced that she would join the flotilla and published a letter in support of the flotilla.

== See also ==
- List of participants in the 2010 Gaza Freedom Flotilla
- List of participants of the Global Sumud Flotilla
