= Sindicato Popular de Vendedores Ambulantes =

The Sindicato Popular de Vendedores Ambulantes (Popular Union of Street Vendors) is a workers union representing street vendors (known as manteros) in Spain. The vendors often face precarious economic conditions, lack of access to government services, racist discrimination, and violence at the hands of police.

== History ==
In 2015, the community of street vendors in Barcelona, mostly undocumented west-African immigrants, banded together to unionise, forming the Sindicato Popular de Vendedores Ambulantes.

In 2017, the union launched its own fashion brand, named Top Manta. Its logo was based on both the shape of a blanket, as many manteros lay their wares on blankets, and the shape of a canoe, meant to symbolise the way many of the union's members arrived in Spain.

The union participated in the Food Sovereignty and Small Scale Fisheries Encounter in Barcelona in June 2019.

During the COVID-19 pandemic in Spain, the union organised a network to distribute food and necessities to vulnerable families. The union transformed parts of its Top Manta clothing store into a workshop to make face masks and PPE. However, the union faced attacks from police, with the Guàrdia Urbana de Barcelona threatening anti-racist mutual aid groups with fines up 60 000 €. The pandemic also posed significant difficulties for street vendors, as they were ineligible for social benefits and unable to gain income from selling due to quarantine measures.

In February 2021, the union received a £7500 grant from Black Lives Matter UK, among the first organisations to be granted. In March 2021, Serigne Mbayé, the spokesperson of the union's Madrid branch, announced that he would be running in the 2021 Madrilenian regional election under the Unidas Podemos banner.
