= Drake U'u =

American-Australian basketball player (born 1990)

Personal information
- Born: January 18, 1990 (age 36) Sacramento, California, U.S.
- Listed height: 6 ft 5 in (1.96 m)
- Listed weight: 215 lb (98 kg)

Career information
- High school: Rio Americano (Sacramento, California)
- College: Hartford (2008–2009); Cal Poly (2010–2013)
- NBA draft: 2013: undrafted
- Playing career: 2013–2015
- Position: Shooting guard / point guard
- Number: 22

Career history
- 2013–2015: Perth Wildcats

Career highlights
- NBL champion (2014)

Drake Ellison U'u (born January 18, 1990) is an American-Australian former professional basketball player. He played college basketball for the University of Hartford and California Polytechnic State University, before playing two seasons in the Australian National Basketball League (NBL) with the Perth Wildcats, where he won a championship in 2014. He was part of the Sacramento Kings organization between 2015 and 2020, including serving as the assistant general manager of the Stockton Kings.

== High school career ==
U'u attended Rio Americano High School in Sacramento, California, where he was a three-time first-team All-Capital League honoree. As a senior in 2007–08, he averaged 17.9 points and 5.0 rebounds per game, as he earned Sacramento Bee third-team All-Metro honors after helping the Raiders finish with a 22–6 record. U'u also earned two letters in swimming, with All-America honors in both the 50- and 100-yard freestyle events.

== College career ==
As a freshman for Hartford in 2008–09, U'u appeared in 18 games with five starting assignments and averaged 2.9 points and 1.7 rebounds per game.

In 2009, U'u transferred to California Polytechnic State University and subsequently redshirted the 2009–10 season due to NCAA transfer regulations.

As a redshirted sophomore for Cal Poly in 2010–11, U'u appeared in 18 games and averaged 14.0 minutes per game. He scored a season-high 10 points during a 55–48 victory over Loyola Marymount on November 24, 2010. He finished the season averaging 2.7 points and 2.1 rebounds per game.

As a junior in 2011–12, U'u started during 18 of 26 appearances, averaged 21.2 minutes played and finished sixth among Mustangs with 6.1 points per game; also averaged 3.7 rebounds, 1.3 assists and 1.0 steals per game. He hit three 3-pointers to finish with a season-high 13 points against Mississippi Valley State on November 26, 2011. He later missed Cal Poly's final seven games of the season after injuring his left hand.

As a senior in 2012–13, U'u averaged 5.3 points, 3.2 rebounds and 2.5 assists in 32 games (20 starts). He recorded career highs of 14 points and eight assists against Hawaii on January 24, 2013.

== Professional career ==
In August 2013, U'u arrived in Australia to trial with the Perth Wildcats of the National Basketball League. On September 16, he signed with the Wildcats as an injury replacement for Mathiang Muo, who was ruled out of the 2013–14 season with an Achilles injury. On January 10, 2014, U'u scored 10 of his season-high 13 points in the second quarter of the Wildcats' 102–87 win over the Townsville Crocodiles. He finished the game 4-of-4 from 3-point range. He helped the Wildcats reach the 2014 NBL Grand Final series, where they defeated the Adelaide 36ers 2–1 to win the championship. He came off the bench to score eight points in the deciding game of the grand final series against Adelaide.

On September 17, 2014, U'u re-signed with the Wildcats on a three-year deal. On December 14, 2014, he scored a career-high 20 points on 7-of-7 shooting, including 5-of-5 from 3-point range, in a 97–76 win over the 36ers.

On May 15, 2015, U'u decided not to take the option on his contract which would have allowed him to stay at the Wildcats until 2017. In 61 games for the Wildcats over two seasons, he averaged 2.8 points and 1.2 rebounds per game.

== Front office career ==
In August 2015, U'u joined the Sacramento Kings' front office as manager of player development. In August 2018, he was appointed the assistant general manager of Sacramento's NBA G League affiliate, the Stockton Kings. In September 2020, he was furloughed by the Kings organization following the delayed start to the 2020–21 NBA G League season due to the COVID-19 pandemic. He ultimately did not return to the Kings.

== Career statistics ==
Legend
GP	Games played	GS	Games started	MPG	Minutes per game
FG%	Field goal percentage	3P%	3-point field goal percentage	FT%	Free throw percentage
RPG	Rebounds per game	APG	Assists per game	SPG	Steals per game
BPG	Blocks per game	PPG	Points per game	**Bold**	Career high

=== College ===
Year	Team	GP	GS	MPG	FG%	3P%	FT%	RPG	APG	SPG	BPG	PPG
2008–09	Hartford	18	5	11.1	.290	.140	.500	1.7	.3	.4	.1	2.9
2009–10	Cal Poly	Transfer										
2010–11	Cal Poly	18	1	14.0	.288	.133	.526	2.1	.8	.4	.1	2.7
2011–12	Cal Poly	26	18	21.2	**.438**	.292	**.681**	**3.7**	1.3	**1.0**	**.3**	**6.1**
2012–13	Cal Poly	**32**	**20**	**21.8**	.347	**.300**	.592	3.2	**2.5**	.6	–	5.3
Career		94	44	18.1	.358	.219	.602	2.9	1.4	.6	.1	4.6

== Personal life ==
U'u has a Samoan father, Al, and an Australian mother, Caroline. He was born in the United States and has dual American and Australian citizenship. He has two younger siblings, a sister named Greer and a brother named Parker.
