= Rio Americano High School =

Location
- 4540 American River Drive; Sacramento, California 95864; 38.57787°N 121.35686°W

Information
- Type: Public high school
- Established: 1963
- School district: San Juan Unified School District
- Principal: Cliff Kelly
- Teaching staff: 75.78 (on FTE basis)
- Grades: 9–12
- Enrollment: 1,867 (2023-2024)
- Student to teacher ratio: 24.64
- Campus: Suburban
- Colors: Green and Gold
- Athletics conference: Capital Valley Conference; CIF Sac-Joaquin Section
- Team name: Raiders
- Newspaper: The Mirada
- Communities served: Arden Park, Arden Oaks, Sierra Oaks, Fair Oaks, Carmichael, Gold River, La Sierra
- Website: Rio Americano High School Online

Rio Americano High School, colloquially known as Rio, is a public high school in Arden-Arcade, California, just outside Sacramento, serving students in grades 9 through 12 as part of the San Juan Unified School District. Rio Americano students come from the surrounding areas of Arden Park, Arden Oaks, Sierra Oaks, Fair Oaks, Carmichael, Gold River, and to a much lesser extent, the La Sierra community. In recent years, more students have been transferring from other districts and areas, partly due to the shift of Sacramento High School to a charter school. Rio's two rival schools are Jesuit High School and El Camino Fundamental High School because of the schools' close proximity.

As of the 2022–23 school year, the school had an enrollment of 1,884 students. Cliff Kelly is the principal.

== Awards and recognition ==
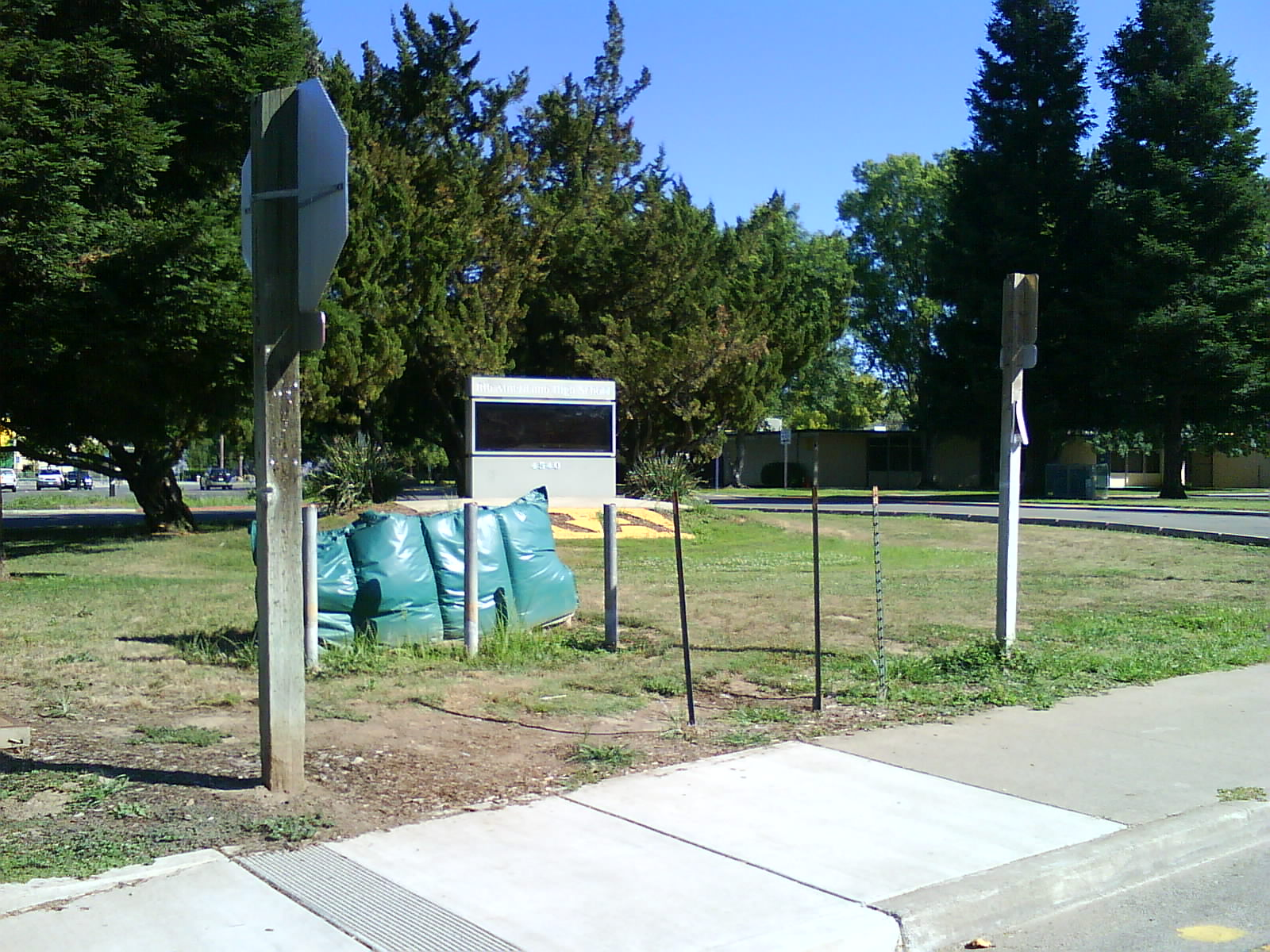
Rio Americano High School, Sacramento, California

During the 1994–96 and 2006–07 school years, Rio Americano High School was recognized with the Blue Ribbon School Award of Excellence by the United States Department of Education, the highest award an American school can receive.

In 2008 Newsweek ranked Rio as number 595 on their list of the top 1,300 public schools in the United States.

In 2013, Rio Americano held an Academic Performance Index (API) of 823.

Rio Americano produces a handful of National Merit commended students and a few National Merit semifinalists each year. Rio students also perform well on Advanced Placement (AP) exams, with over 400 AP exam scores of 3 or better and over 100 AP exam scores of 5 (the highest score possible) in 2009.

== Demographics ==
Demographics	White	Asian	Middle Eastern	African American	Hispanic	American Indian	Filipino	Pacific Islander
Percentage	50%	12%	24%	2%	9%	<1.0%	<1.5%	<0.5%

== Extracurricular activities ==
=== Science Bowl ===
Science Bowl is an academic competition sponsored by the United States Department of Energy that tests students in various categories of Science including Biology, Chemistry, Physics, Space Science, Earth Science, Energy, and Mathematics. Rio won the Sacramento Regional Competition in 1992 and competed in the national tournament in Washington, DC.

== Notable alumni ==
- Barbi Benton (1968) - Former Playboy Playmate and girlfriend of Hugh Hefner
- John Bowker (2001) - outfielder for the Pittsburgh Pirates
- John Daversa - jazz trumpet player and three-time Grammy Award Winner in 2019.
- Channing Dungey (1986) - American television executive and producer, First African-American to serve as president of ABC Entertainment Group.
- Merrin Dungey (1989) - actress
- Patty Fendick (1983) - professional tennis player
- Mike Flanagan (1991) - former center for the Houston Texans and the Green Bay Packers Selected to the Pro Bowl.
- John Ferris (1967) - Winner of two bronze medals in swimming for the U. S. team at the 1968 Summer Olympics.
- Ted Gaines - California State Senator, former state assemblyman
- Taylor Graham (1998) - professional soccer player.
- Alex Heartman (2008) - Actor most notably as the Red Ranger in Power Rangers Samurai
- Jason Kamras (1991) - National Teacher of the Year, 2005
- Jonathan Karsh (1990) - independent film and television producer
- Goodwin Liu (1987) - Supreme Court of California Associate Justice and former UC Berkeley Law Professor
- Linsey Marr (1992) - Environmental Engineering professor at Virginia Tech whose expertise on aerosols and virus transmission made her a frequently cited authority who appeared in major media news programs and columns during the COVID-19 pandemic. Recipient of the MacArthur Foundation Fellows Program "Genius" Grant in 2023.
- Trevor Matich (1979) - 12-year NFL lineman.
- Debbie Meyer (1970) - three-time Olympic gold medalist swimmer at the 1968 Summer Olympics.
- Amobi Okugo (2009) - Major League Soccer player
- Christine O'Moore (1997) - artist, musician, former Orthodox priest and trans woman best known for her humanitarian work and social activism. She was formerly known as Christoforos Schuff.
- Doug Ose (1973) - Former Congressman who represented California's 3rd congressional district from 1998 to 2004.
- Chad Overhauser (1993) - Played offensive line for the Chicago Bears and Houston Texans.
- Susan Pedersen (1971) - four-time Olympic medalist at the 1968 Summer Olympics
- Johnny Rabb (1990) - Professional Touring Drummer. Also plays in a duo named BioDiesel. Has been the drummer for Collective Soul since 2012.
- Charles M. Rice (1970) - virologist, winner of Nobel Prize
- Alexia Roditis (2016) - musician, lead vocalist of the band Destroy Boys
- Christopher F. Rufo (2002) - writer, political commentator, & activist
- Jane Sibbett (1980) - actress best known for playing Carol Willick on Friends
- David Sirlin - video game designer, fighting games player, and writer
- Mark Suster - Venture Capitalist...
- Adrian Tomine (1992)- Cartoonist
- Drake U'u (2008)- Professional basketball player
- W. Craig Vanderwagen, MD (1967) Former Assistant Secretary for Preparedness and Response, US Department of Health and Human Services
- Sasha Victorine (1996) - midfielder for Chivas USA of Major League Soccer
- James Leighman Williams (2003) - Olympic Silver Medalist - Fencing
