= Vito Quiles =

Spanish political influencer (born 2000)

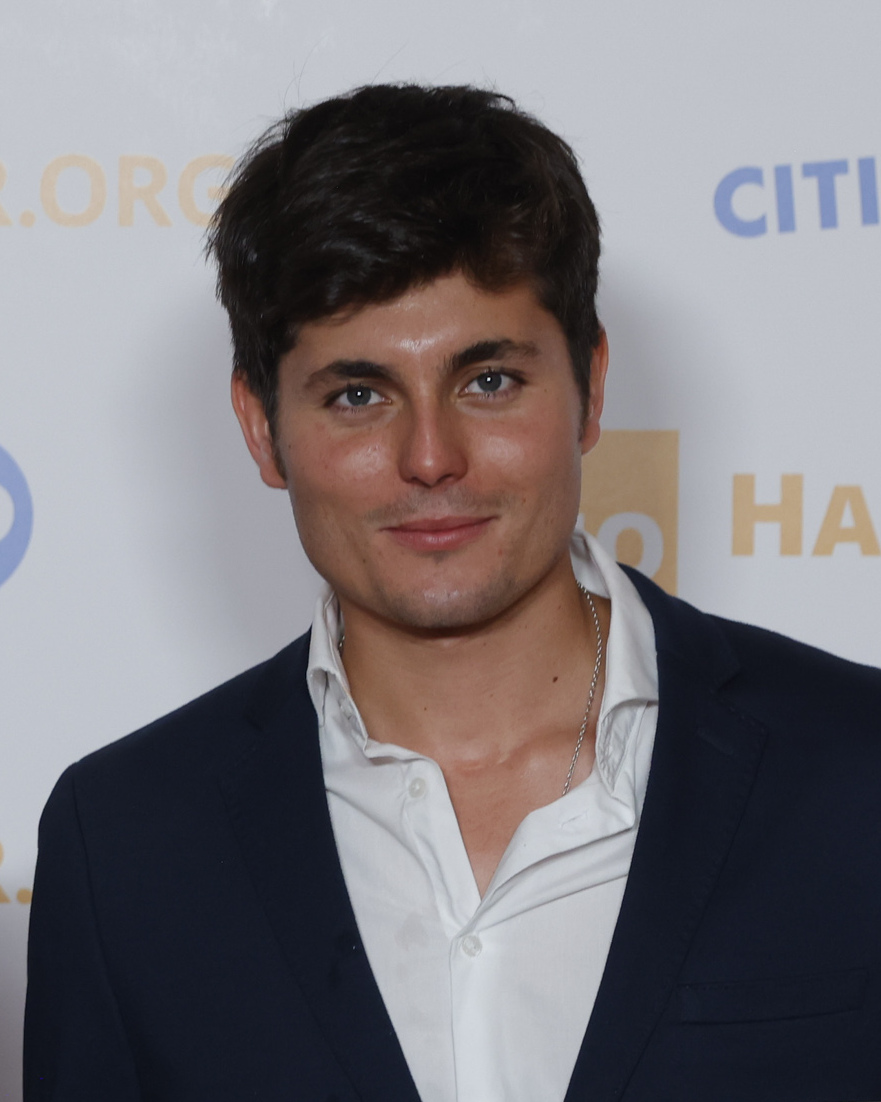
- Quiles in 2025.
- Born: 2000 (age 25–26); Elche, Valencian Community, Spain
- Occupations: Political influencer Activist
- Years active: 2020–present
- Political party: Se Acabó La Fiesta

Vito Zoppellari Quiles (born 2000) is a Spanish far-right political activist and influencer. Having started as a corrrespondent for EDA TV at the Congress of Deputies, he became known on social media for his vox pop interviews. Since 2024, he has been the press officer and a chief spokesman for the Se Acabó La Fiesta party, founded by Alvise Pérez, and was on its list for the 2024 European Parliament election.

== Early life and career ==
Quiles was born in Elche in Alicante to an Italian father, an entrepreneur who ran six businesses, and a Spanish mother. Quiles' maternal grandfather, Vicente Quiles Fuentes, owned a successful cobbler's business and was the last Francoist mayor of Elche. Quiles studied journalism at the Complutense University of Madrid, showing an interest in politics and digital communication, but dropped out before graduating. Quiles started his career on right-wing digital media network EDA TV. Here he started to cover the Congress of Deputies through social media clips of meeting and asking politicians questions. He was named the press officer of the Se Acabó La Fiesta political party when it was founded in 2024.

== Political activism ==
Quiles was arrested in 2023 for pushing a police officer guarding a safety cordon at an unauthorised protest in Madrid. In October 2025, Quiles embarked on a tour of Spanish universities inspired by Charlie Kirk, called "España combativa". His first stop at the Autonomous University of Barcelona was met with counter-protests, and Quiles was not allowed to enter due to not having asked for authorisation.

On 20 October 2025, the three Andalusian universities scheduled on Quiles' tour: Pablo de Olavide University, the University of Granada and the University of Málaga, made a statement that Quiles had not applied for accreditation, contrary to what he had previously suggested. The Pablo de Olavide and Málaga universities later confirmed he had attempted to do so through third parties. His final stop at the University of Navarra, attracted a counter-protest of hundreds, prompting Quiles to suspend his tour indefinitely. Sociologist Ignacia Perugorría suggested that "the conflict, not the speech, is the main event" at Quiles' rallies, suggesting his rallies were "a sham of a rebellion, where the transgression becomes the show and the confrontation becomes viral content."

In February 2026, Quiles appeared at the People's Party campaign for the 2026 Aragonese regional election. On 13 May 2026, his press accreditation for the Congress of Deputies was revoked indefinitely along with that of Vox activist Bertrand Ndongo to "protect the rights of deputies and media representatives" against "repeated altercation and a notable deterioration of harmony".
