= Bertrand Ndongo =

Spanish political activist

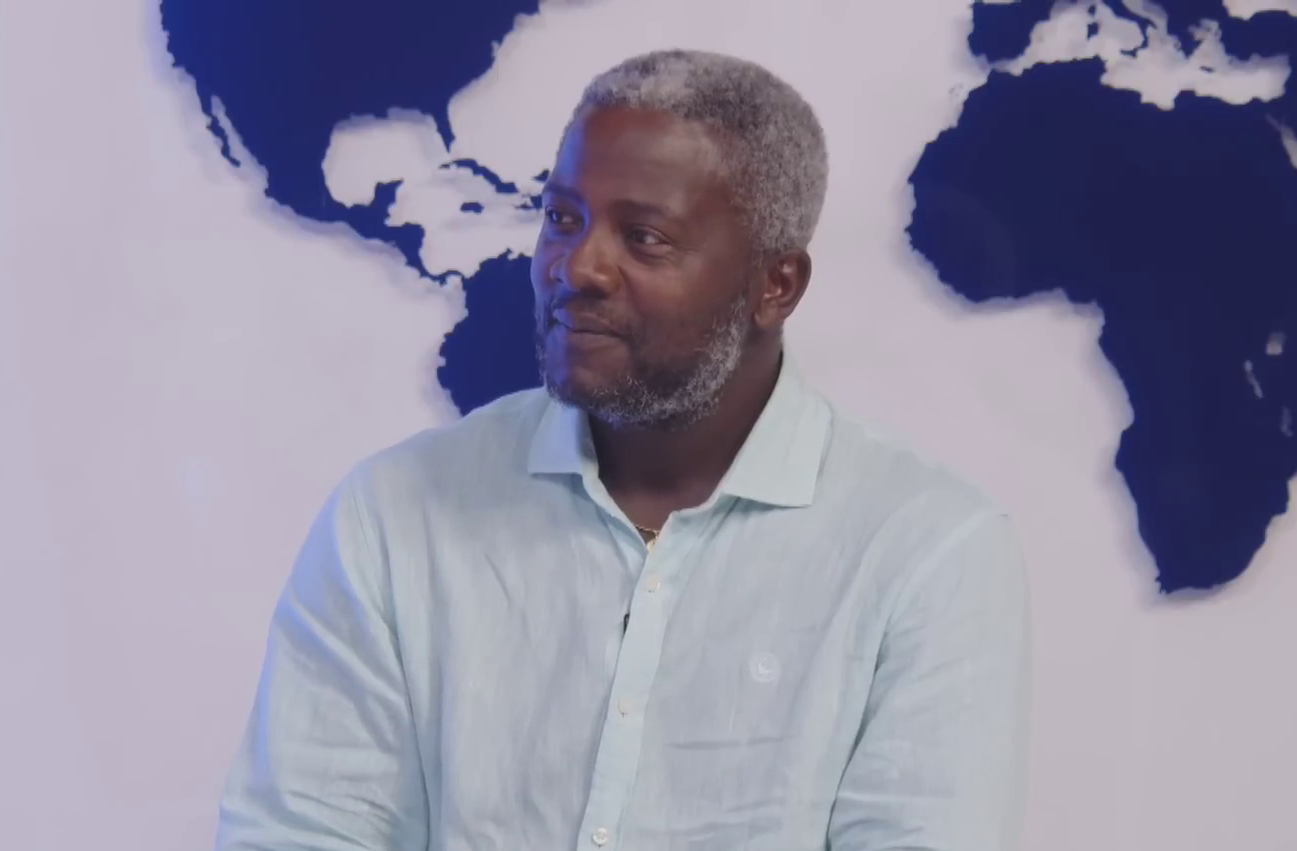
Bertrand Ndongo in 2025.

Yves Bertrand Ndongo (born 1989 or 1990) is a Cameroonian-born activist for the far-right Spanish political party Vox. He has been nicknamed in the media and in self-reference as "El Negro de Vox" (Vox's Black Guy). Since 2019, he has been a consultant to Rocío Monasterio, the party's leader in the Community of Madrid. Ndongo has been banned from Twitter several times for offensive content.

== Biography ==
Ndongo's father was an educated and well-off man who worked for UNICEF. When his mother left the family due to her husband's infidelity, he was raised by relatives and at times by church institutions. While in neighbouring Gabon, he began a relationship with a Spanish missionary. Aged 20 in 2010, he moved to Spain with his pregnant partner and became a cleaner in Alcorcón, Community of Madrid, eventually rising to management. As of 2019, he is a father of three.

Ndongo joined Vox because he considered them to have forthright views that reflected his values. He supports limiting migration to Spain and closing down illegal immigration due to the risks at sea, modern slavery in Libya and the dangerous lives that undocumented people end up in on arrival in Spain.

In early 2019, Ndongo gained attention for appearing on the Espejo Público programme on Antena 3 in which he denied the existence of racism in Spain; he said it was ironic that his opponent Elisa Beni, a white woman, was saying the opposite. He believes that the Spanish Socialist Workers' Party and Podemos exaggerate racism to obtain black people's votes. He supports migrant hawkers being regularised and becoming taxpayers, rather than living off charity.

In December 2019, Ndongo, who had built up a following on YouTube, became a consultant to Rocío Monasterio, Vox's leader in the Community of Madrid. In the same month, he criticised King Felipe VI for lacking "balls" for having made a Christmas speech in which he called for Spain not to fall into the "extremes of the past"; this reaction differed greatly from Vox's official reaction.

Also in December 2019, Ndongo made headlines for his reaction to a gang rape of a minor by players of the Arandina CF football team. He wrote on Twitter "These girls consume alcohol, smoke and upload to Instagram photos of their arses and their thongs, but when things happen later we call them minors", and said "Today I woke up with the sensation that any woman can drop my sons in the shit and ruin their lives whenever she feels like it". He also uploaded audio from the victim. In 2021, this was investigated by the Spanish Data Protection Agency (AEPD).

In February 2020, Ndongo was suspended from Twitter for video clips in which he said that left-wing women are sexually unsatisfied as they lack virile men in their lives. Nine months later, he was suspended again for spreading fake news in which he used an unrelated photograph from Algeria to implicate Arabs in the looting of a Lacoste store in Logroño. In May 2023, his account was suspended again for a post that mocked the disability of Unidas Podemos politician Pablo Echenique; he said that Echenique could not call Vox lazy if he "can't even get his dick out to pee".

In April 2021, Ndongo strongly criticised Vox for their threat to deport Serigne Mbayé, a Madrid deputy for Unidas Podemos who was born in Senegal and naturalised as a Spaniard.

Ndongo was falsely rumoured to have been killed in November 2023 during protests against amnesty for leaders of the 2017 Catalan independence referendum. He replied the next morning in a video beginning "¡El negro está vivo!" (The black guy is alive!) and said that he had received concerned calls and messages about the false news.

During the 2024 Spain floods, Ndongo wrote that 700 parking tickets from an underground car park at a shopping centre in Valencia had not been retrieved, meaning that hundreds of dead bodies were trapped. The claim was false as the car park did not use ticketing.

== See also ==
- Ignacio Garriga, also nicknamed "El Negro de Vox", though not in self-reference
- Vito Quiles
