= Annette Groth =

German politician

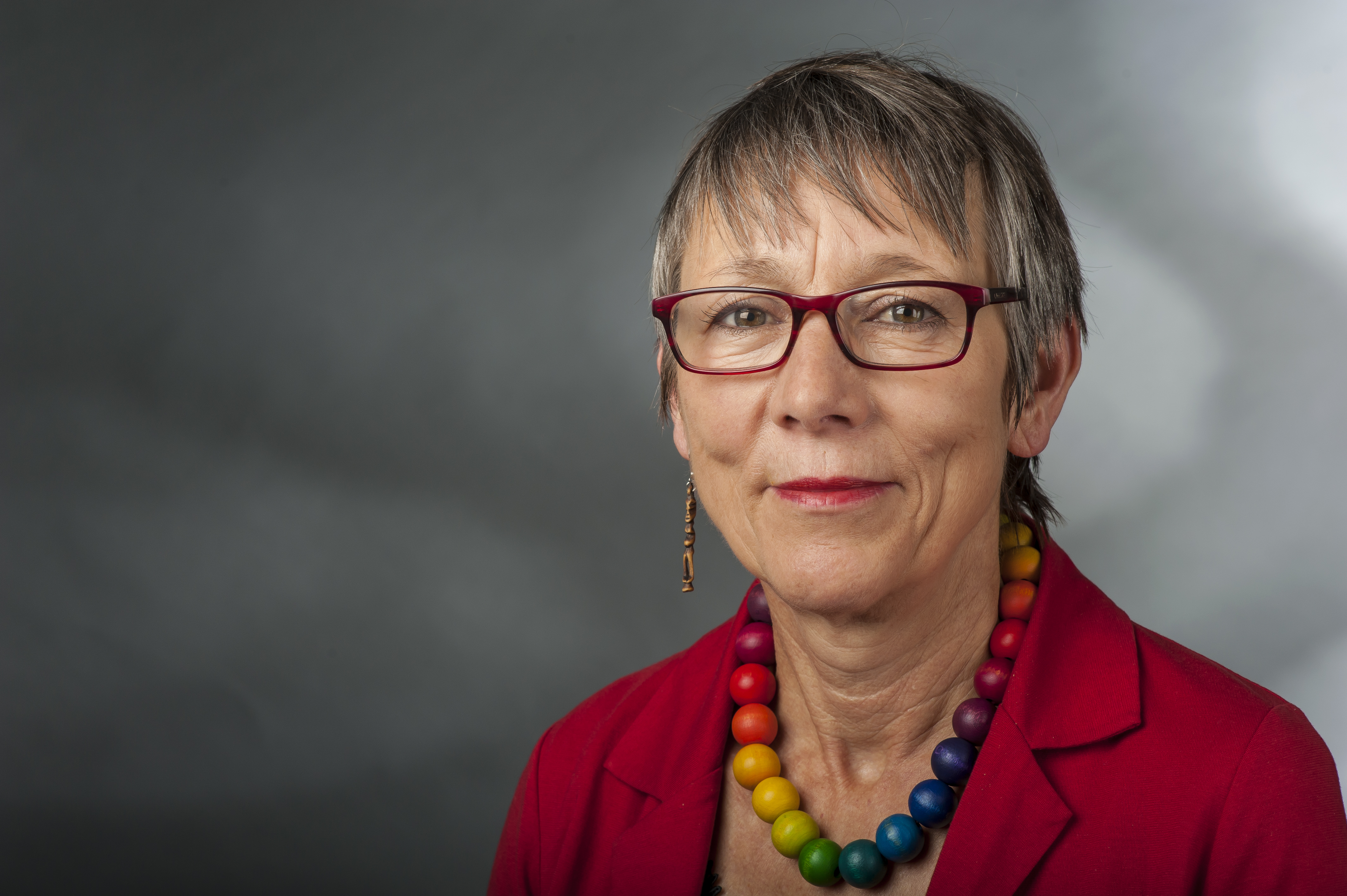

Personal details
- Born: 16 May 1954 (age 72) Bielefeld, West Germany
- Party: The Left
- Education: Free University of Berlin

Annette Groth (born 16 May 1954 in Bielefeld) is a German politician from Baden-Wuerttemberg.

== Career ==
From 1974 to 1979, she studied at the Free University of Berlin, in development sociology, economics and business administration and international politics. She passed her diploma in sociology.

From 1981 to 1984, she worked as a research fellow at the European Research Institute of Ecumenical Research Exchange (ERE) in Rotterdam, on migrant workers in the EC. From 1984 to 1987, she worked in the office of the Protestant Student Community Stuttgart as ecumenical officer. From 1992 to 1997, she was Education Officer at the United Nations High Commissioner for Refugees, UNHCR in Geneva. From 1997 to 1999, she worked as director of the Ecumenical Coalition on Third World Tourism (ECTWT), and editor of the quarterly journal Contours in Barbados. For many years she was active in the work of the EKD, before 2007 Research Assistant of The Left (Germany).

She was a guest lecturer at the University of Lüneburg, and was a research associate at the University of Wuppertal. She speaks English, French, Dutch and Spanish.

In 2014, she was at the center of the so-called "Toiletgate" scandal during which Max Blumenthal and David Sheen, two anti-Israel journalists invited by Groth and her colleagues, chased the then-leader of Die Linke, Gregor Gysi, into the bathroom of the Bundestag; in video footage of the incident, Groth can be seen trying to prevent Sheen from following Gysi into the bathroom. Groth subsequently apologized to Gysi. The same year, the Simon Wiesenthal Center placed Groth and several of her Die Linke colleagues fourth on its "Top 10 Most Anti-Semitic" List.

== Party ==
Since October 2007, she is a member of the Left party in Baden-Württemberg, a member of the AK European integration, the BAG peace and international politics and active in the European Left Party to the feminist structures "EL-Fem". She is also a member of the Forum of the Rosa Luxemburg Foundation of Baden-Wuerttemberg.

Annette Groth is co-founder of the "attacking anti-GATS campaign and the nationwide" Attac EU-AG.

== Member of the Bundestag ==
Groth was a candidate for the 2009 German federal election by the Left Party, for Pforzheim, reaching 6.8 per cent of first votes. She was elected to the 17th Bundestag from Baden-Württemberg of the Left party. For the Left Group, she is the human rights policy officer. She is a member of the Committee for Human Rights and Humanitarian Aid, and the Committee for Economic Cooperation and Development.

== Gaza Flotilla ==
At the end of May 2010, together with Inge Höger and Norman Paech, she accompanied an international convoy from Free Gaza Movement.

It was like war, They had guns, Taser weapons, some type of teargas and other weaponry, compared to two-and-a-half wooden sticks we had between us. To talk of self-defence is ridiculous.

Groth's comments stand in contrast to the United Nations' official report on the incident, the so-called Palmer report; while stating that "the loss of life and injuries resulting from the use of force by Israeli forces during the take-over of the Mavi Marmara was unacceptable," the report observed that the Israeli Defense forces met "organized and violent resistance from a group of passengers". Additionally, The Palmer report "seriously questions the true nature and objectives of the flotilla organizers"; the report concluded that to "deliberately seek to breach a blockade in a convoy with a large number of passengers is in the view of the Panel a dangerous and reckless act."

On 1 June 2010 she spoke at a protest outside the Foreign Ministry in Berlin.

== Statements deemed antisemitic ==
In 2015 at an evangelical church day in Stuttgart, Grothe made the following remarks Gaza Strip:

The water supply in Gaza was destroyed in a very targeted manner. And I have to say that this is also against international law, you can't do that, so I mean, the basis of life in Gaza is almost ... almost ... actually no longer there. Ultimately, Israel is harming itself because all the chemicals – tons! Metric tons! Over thousands of tons! – are now gradually coming into the sea. This is the Mediterranean. It goes on. And there is toxic material in there, you know that too. Yes, well, it is extremely dangerous for everyone else."

Commentators have observed several problems with Groth's assertions: the statement is factually incorrect; it also mirrors long-standing antisemitic tropes that Jews poison wells.
