= Inge Höger =

German politician

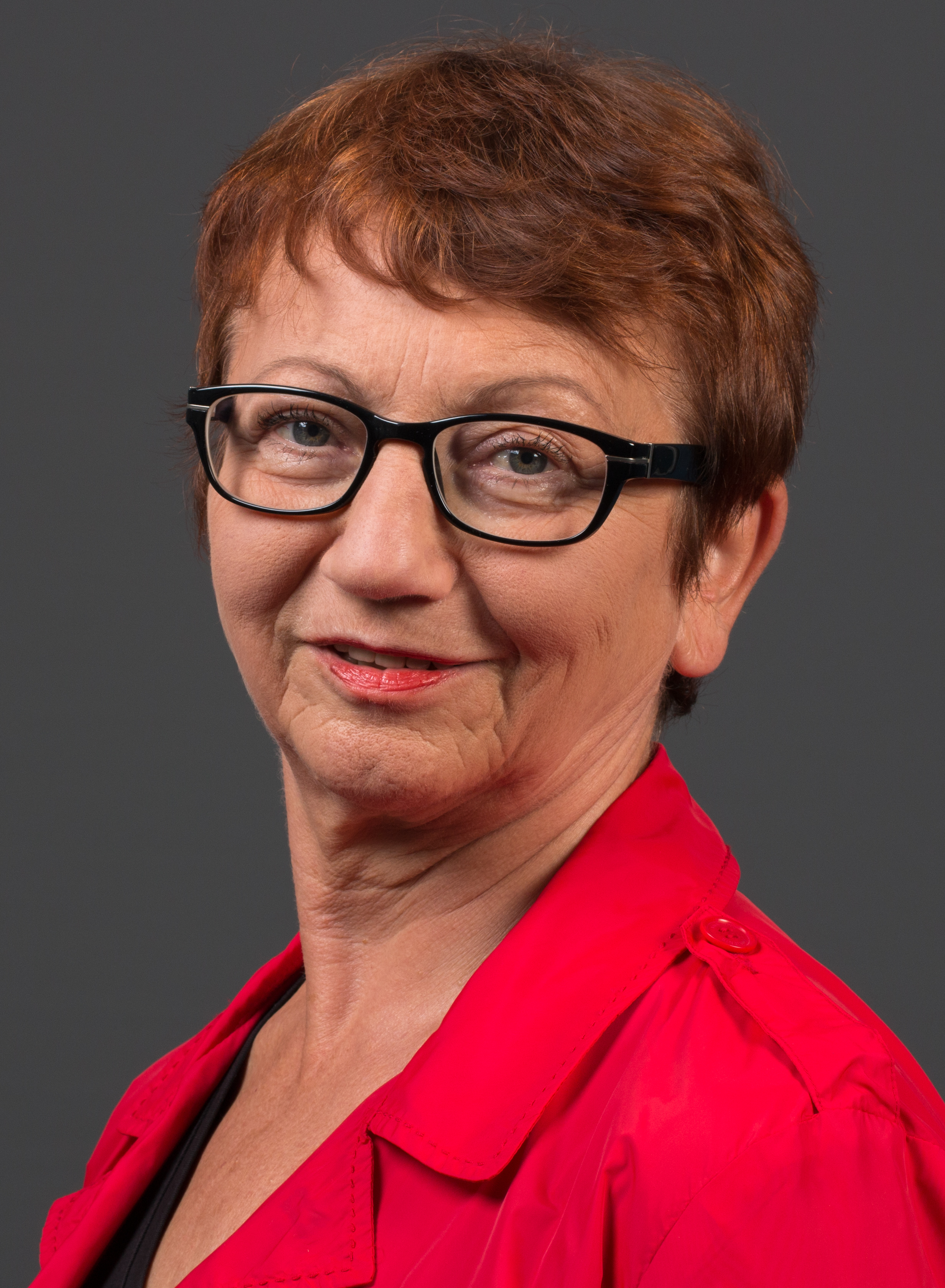

Member of Bundestag
- In office October 22, 2013 – October 24, 2017

Member of Bundestag
- In office October 27, 2009 – October 22, 2013

Member of Bundestag
- In office October 18, 2005 – October 27, 2009

Personal details
- Born: Inge Dora Minna Höger; 29 October 1950 (age 75) Diepholz, Germany
- Party: The Left (since June 16, 2007)
- Education: Bremen University of Applied Sciences
- Website: https://www.inge-hoeger.de/

Inge Dora Minna Höger (born 29 October 1950) is a German politician. From 2005 to 2006, she was a deputy chair of The Left ("Die Linke") parliamentary group in the Bundestag.

== Early life and education ==
After attending elementary school and business school in Rahde, Höger trained as a forwarding agent from 1967 to 1969. She graduated from the Bremen University of Applied Sciences in 1973 with a degree in business administration.

== Career ==
From 1994 onwards, Höger worked in various companies in accounting and worked in the management of AOK ("Allgemeine Ortskrankenkasse") in Herford. From 1993 to 2005, she was chair of the Women's Committee of the DGB. She is also a member of Attac.

Höger became a founding member of the WASG in June 2005 and was also a member of The Left. Since 2006, she has been patron of the WASG-related education community.

Since 2005, Höger has been a member of the Bundestag. At the 2009 election, she unsuccessfully contested the Herford – Minden-Lübbecke II constituency, but was elected from the North Rhine Westphalia land list.

At the end of May 2010, together with Annette Groth and Norman Paech, Höger accompanied a controversial international relief convoy in the Free Gaza Movement. In her descriptions, she said "We felt like we were in a war, like we were being kidnapped.…Nobody had a weapon." She further stated that:

Later, the Israeli soldiers let us go outside, one by one....We were checked and our personal belongings were taken away. Then we were handcuffed with cable retainers and brought to the upper deck....They were obviously looking for weapons. They raided and slashed all the suitcases of all passengers and everything was all over the place.

== Criticism of Israel ==
Höger is noted for her positions against Israeli policies. In 2011, she suggested that Juliano Mer-Khamis and Vittorio Arrigoni, two pro-Palestine activists, may have been killed by Israel. On her website, Höger wrote:

"The question one must pose is: Who profits from this terrible crime? First of all, now two of the activists most 'dangerous' for Israel, because they were the most engaged, wellknown and noted, are eliminated".

Volker Beck, a German Green Party MP and spokesman for the party on human rights, said "Inge Höger's wild conspiracy theory is pure speculation, without any concrete factual basis. ... She employs the centuries-old image of the perfidiously murderous Jews."
