= Norman Paech =

German politician (born 1938)

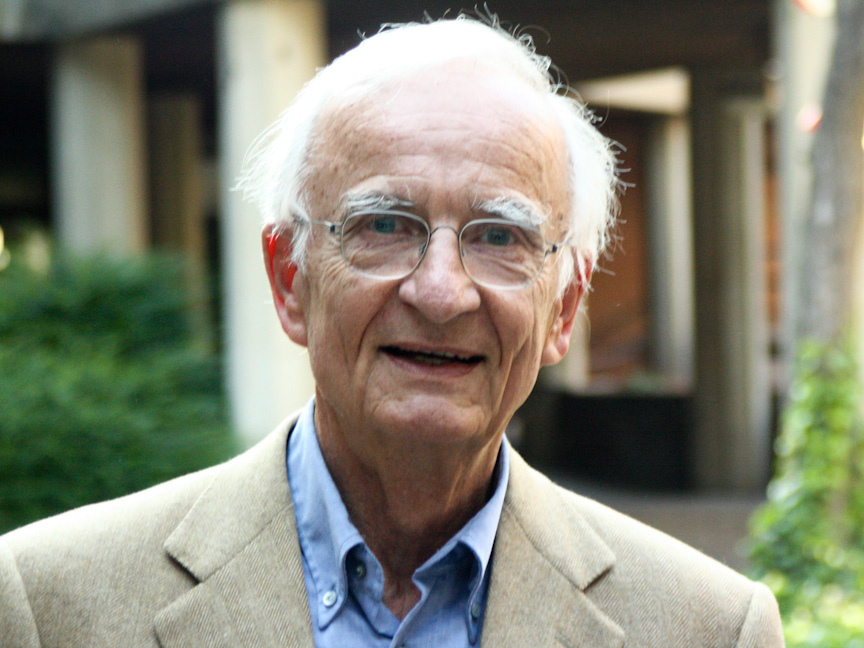
- Paech in 2010

Member of the Bundestag for Hamburg
- In office 2002–2009

Personal details
- Born: 12 April 1938 (age 88) Bremerhaven, Bremen, Germany
- Party: The Left
- Other political affiliations: SPD (1969–2001)

Norman Paech (born 12 April 1938) is a retired German professor and member of the political party The Left.

== Career ==
After taking his Abitur exam in Hamburg, Paech studied history and law at the University of Tübingen, as well as in Munich and Paris. From 1959 he studied law in Hamburg, finishing in 1962 with the first state exam. He then worked as a researcher at the University of Hamburg. In 1965, he obtained a doctorate degree for his thesis Tarifautonomie und staatliche Intervention – Ein Beitrag zum Problem der Zwangsschlichtung von Arbeitsstreitigkeiten ("Collective bargaining and state intervention – A contribution to the problem of compulsory arbitration of labor disputes"). In 1967, he passed the second state exam in law.

After postgraduate studies at the German Development Institute in Berlin, he joined the Federal Ministry of Economic Cooperation in 1968 as a research assistant. In 1972, he joined the research centre of the Federation of German Scientists in Hamburg as a research associate. In 1974, he began teaching political science at the Faculty of Law II at the University of Hamburg.

In 1982, he became a professor of public law at the Hochschule of Economics and Politics (HWP; since 2005 known as the Hamburg University of Economics and Politics). Paech has been professor emeritus since 2005. From 1976 to 1985, he was chairman of the Association of Democratic lawyers and from 1985 to 1993 was chief editor of the legal-political quarterly Democracy and Law. After the Yugoslav Wars, he became a critic of the legal proceedings of the International Criminal Tribunal for the former Yugoslavia; in particular, he criticized the proceedings against former Serbian President Slobodan Milošević.

Paech is a member of the ATTAC scientific advisory board.

== Politics ==
Paech became a member of the SPD in 1969 and, from 1972 to 1973, belonged to the state executive board of the Young Socialists in Hamburg. He resigned from the SPD in 2001, after the party's Red-Green coalition passed a resolution to deploy the Bundeswehr in Afghanistan.

In 2000, following a ruling by the Áreios Págos (Supreme Court of Greece), Paech said that Germany had to compensate the victims of Nazi war crimes in Greece. One event noted at the time, for which German president Johannes Rau laid a memorial wreath, was the Massacre of Kalavryta. Paech had also represented survivors and relatives of the Distomo massacre, saying in 2000, "It is not only the money that the victims are concerned about, but also the German side's acknowledgement of its responsibility for the crimes committed. The SS executioners, who executed 218 villagers (of Distomo) in retaliation against an attack by Greek guerrillas, still celebrate each year in Marktheinfeld (a town in Bavaria) their adventures in Greece and have still not given account for their deeds...."

Paech was also well known for his studies on the Kurdish issue – championing the Kurdish people's right to self-determination and secession from Turkey.

Paech was a member of the 16th German Bundestag (2005–2009), having been elected via the open candidate list of Die Linkspartei.PDS in the federal state of Hamburg. He became an official member of this party in 2007 and was its spokesman on foreign affairs and representative in the Federal Constitutional Court proceedings against the Panavia Tornado missions in Afghanistan.

== Criticism on Israel ==
According to journalist Jan-Philipp Hein, Paech frequently puts Israel near state terrorism and racism, while regarding anti-Israeli terrorism as mere resistance. Paech, however, denied the article's claims of him belittling Palestinian violence.

Paech was among eleven PDS MPs who abstained from voting on the anti-semitism declaration, which was made on the occasion of the 70th Kristallnacht anniversary. Their actions drew criticism from the Union and Green Bundestag fractions. The eleven MPs explained that, while the concerns are justified, the declaration would discredit any criticism on American and Israeli war policies as an act of anti-semitism.

=== Gaza flotilla ===
Together with Inge Höger and Annette Groth, Paech accompanied the international relief convoy to the Gaza Strip in May 2010. After the raid on the convoy, he stated:

The Israeli government justifies the raid because they were attacked. This is absolutely not the case. This was not an act of self-defence... We had not prepared in any way to fight. We didn't even consider it. No violence, no resistance – because we knew very well that we would have absolutely no chance against soldiers like this. This was an attack in international waters on a peaceful mission... This was a clear act of piracy.

— Norman Paech

== Publications ==
- With Gerhard Stuby: International law and power politics in international relations. Bielefeld 2005
- Ed: international law instead of power politics – contributions for Gerhard Stuby. Hamburg 2004
- The social, economic and cultural human rights in the legal system of international economic and trade order. Bonn 2003
- Action field world affairs – international foundations of a global governance. Hamburg 2003
- Democracy – where and how?, Hamburg 2002.
- When it comes to war in Afghanistan, Army deployment and international law. Frankfurt am Main 2001.
- With Gerhard Stuby and Joachim Hösler: International law and power politics in international relations – a study book. Hamburg 2,001
- John Block (ed.): The just war? NATO's new strategy, international law and the Europeanization of the Western Balkans. Bremen 2002
- With Martin Kucha: censuses. 1986
