= Chris O'Moore =

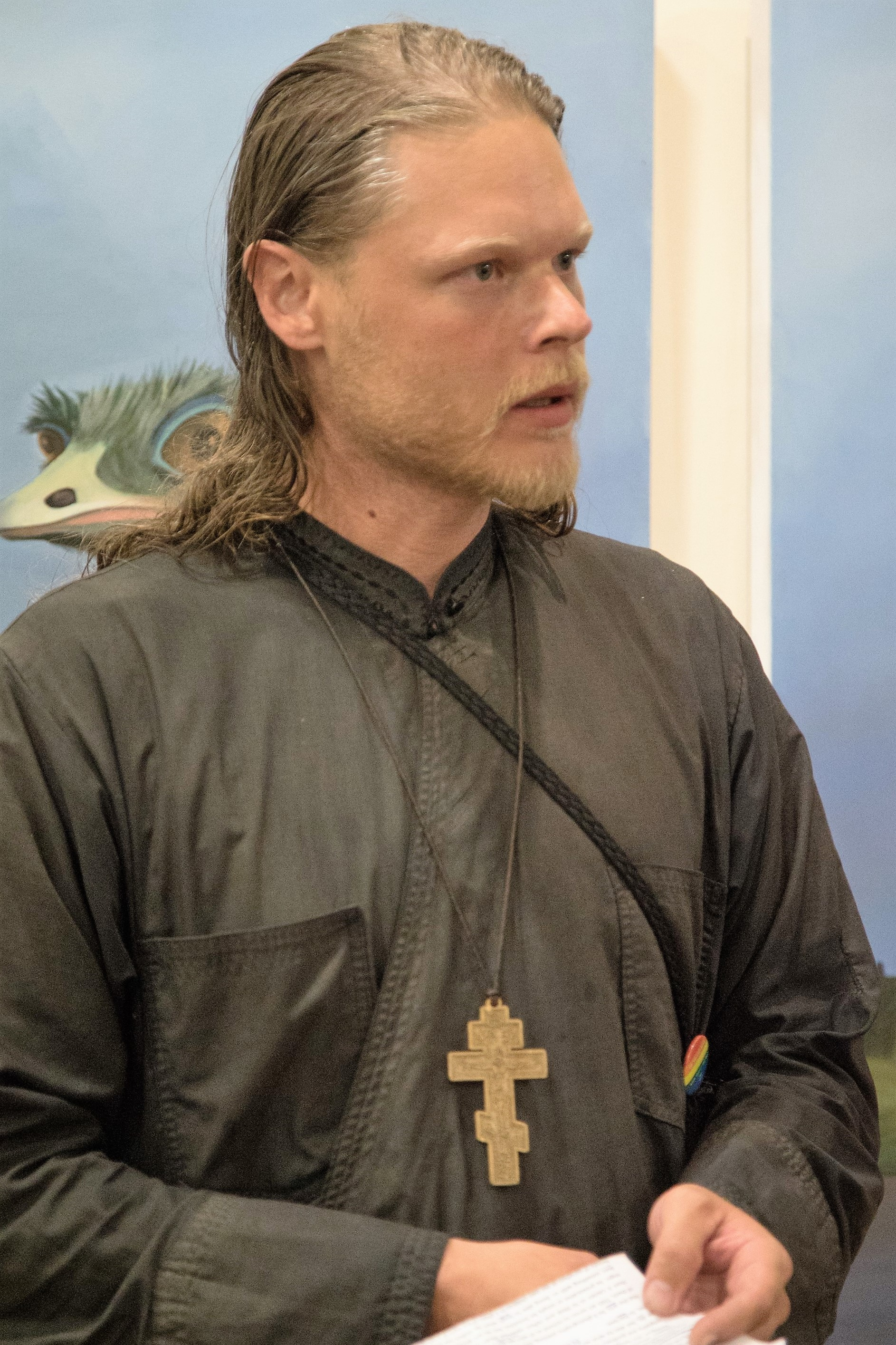
- Chris O'Moore holding the opening of an art exhibition in Mytilene in 2016

Background information
- Born: Christopher Michael Schuff; February 6, 1979 (age 47); Carmichael, Sacramento County, California U.S.
- Origin: Sacramento, California
- Genres: Singer-songwriter; Blues rock; Country; Mariachi
- Occupations: Visual Artist, Composer, Singer-songwriter
- Years active: 1999–present
- Label: CELLAR productions

Chris O'Moore (formerly Christoforos Schuff; born February 6, 1979, in Sacramento, California, as Christopher Michael Schuff) is a former Greek-Orthodox priest, musician and artist recognized for his humanitarian work and social activism. He is known for his writings and discourses on religion and society, social justice, human rights and participation in inter-faith dialogue. O'Moore has appeared in the media regularly, especially in Norway and Greece, since 2006. He lived full-time as a trans woman from 2020, known as "Christine", before detransitioning in 2023. He has been the subject of several documentaries and in various programs in Europe and the United States for his work with refugees.

O'Moore has been described as "unorthodox" (translated) and "colorful in black" (translated), due to his way of life and stances on certain religious and social issues.

== Early life and education ==
O'Moore was born in Carmichael, Sacramento County, California as the child of John W. Schuff and Lynn M. Mapes. O'Moore has one older brother and in her teenage years resided periodically with two foster families. At 17 he was featured in The Sacramento Bee as an up-and-coming magician.

O'Moore was enrolled in two private Christian schools until completing middle school and graduated from Rio Americano High School in 1997. He holds a master's degree in religious studies from the University of Agder in Norway, a graduate diploma in music pedagogy from the Ministry of Education, Research and Religious Affairs of Greece, in addition to undergraduate studies in subjects such as linguistics, history, pedagogy, organic agriculture, gender and equality studies and law. He is a certified teacher (lektor) in Norway. O'Moore is a certified combat medic and has voluntarily done evacuation work on the frontline in Ukraine in 2022 and 2023.

== Religious life ==
O'Moore attended several non-denominational churches in the Sacramento area throughout his childhood and youth. From 2001 O'Moore resided for extended periods of time annually at the Saint Ignatios Monastery (Limonos Monastery) on the Greek Island of Lesvos where he was baptized in 2006. He was ordained a deacon under the Archdiocese of Russian Orthodox churches in Western Europe in Paris in 2007 and a priest in 2008 in Oslo, then a part of the Ecumenical Patriarchate of Constantinople.

O'Moore expressed that he feared being excommunicated or defrocked by the Orthodox church for his positions and beliefs, commenting "I sometimes wonder if I can continue to wear the same dress as priests who have ideas totally opposed to mine."

== Civic engagement ==
He is known for promoting sustainable living and for advocating for fair and equal treatment of often marginalized groups such as immigrants, refugees, the LGBT community, indigenous peoples and the poor. In the Fall of 2010 he allowed a Serbian family from Kosovo to receive church asylum in his home, which also housed a chapel. He started the organization "Filoxenos" in 2013, focusing on work with the Romani people, beggars, immigrants and refugees. He has been noted for his role during the refugee crisis on Lesbos. He has been active in the anti-war movement through his music and art, speeches and writings and he has often ended his appearances with the phrase: "Fuck injustice and God damn the war!". In 2013, O'Moore received the Focus Award (Fokusprisen) from the deacons' association of the Norwegian Church, for his work with homeless Romani immigrants. In 2015 he was given the Bridgebuilder Award (Brobyggerprisen) by the Norwegian Church Academy (Norske kirkeakademier) for his civic engagement for the poor. On MLK Day 2017 he was awarded the MLK Non-Violence Prize (Ikkevoldsprisen), for his participation in non-violent political demonstrations, his "fearless stances" and work with the poor and refugees. He received the LGBT+ Pride Award in 2017 from the National Association for Lesbians, Gays, Bisexuals and Transgender People of Southern Norway. In 2018 he was recognized by "The Gardens of the Righteous" (GARIWO) for his humanitarian work with refugees.

=== Marriage equality ===
O'Moore has supported LGBT rights, same-sex marriage and marriage equality for what he has called "love in all its forms" and the right for "people of age to live consensually in relationship forms of their choosing," including in polyamorous relationships. His position on marriage equality has been criticized as being at odds with much of mainstream Christianity and the doctrine of the Eastern Orthodox Church.

=== Arrest ===
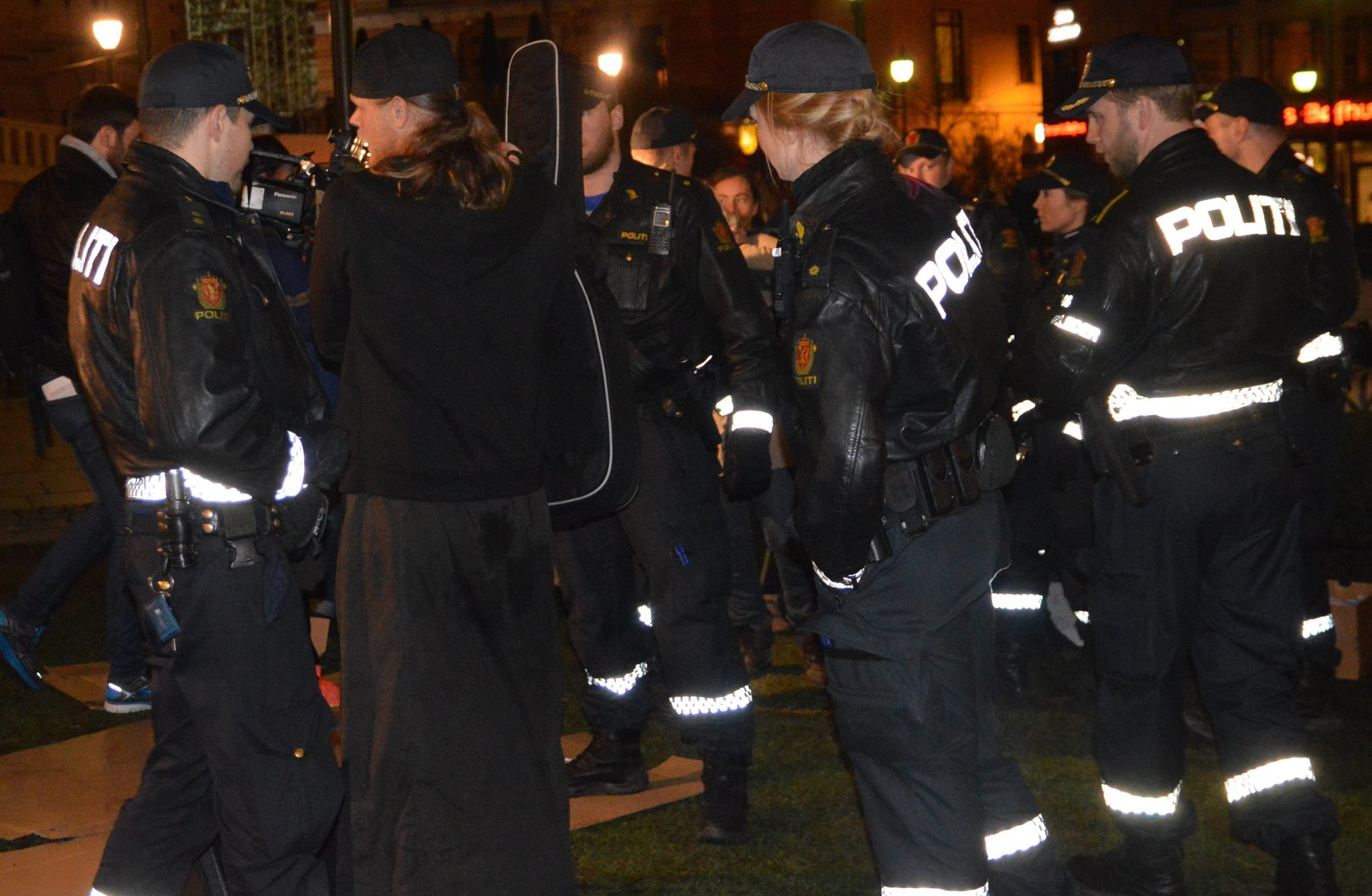
O'Moore being arrested following a demonstration at the Norwegian Parliament – April 2016

On April 10, 2016, O'Moore was arrested for demonstrating without a permit in front of the Norwegian Parliament (Storting) together with five other demonstrators. O'Moore and the other demonstrators submitted peacefully to the arrest. They were released April 11, 2016, charged with holding an unlawful demonstration and for refusing to obey police officer orders. O'Moore was convicted by the District Court of Oslo. For ideological reasons, O'Moore refused to pay the 11,000 Norwegian kroner (NOK) fine. According to O'Moore, the peaceful demonstration was intended to cast light upon the situation of refugees and asylum seekers in Norway and Europe following a law proposal making the criteria for seeking and receiving asylum in Norway much stricter. Several weeks later O'Moore spoke at a parliamentary hearing on this proposal. According to the newspaper Vårt Land, it had been almost thirty years since the last time a priest had been arrested for a political demonstration in Norway. While O'Moore appealed the conviction, citing the right to freedom of speech and the freedom of assembly, as stated in the Universal Declaration of Human Rights, his appeal was rejected.

=== Global Sumud Flotilla ===
O'Moore participated in the Global Sumud Flotilla for Gaza in 2025 and 2026, where he was arrested by the Israeli police and beaten up.

== Music and art ==
O'Moore is well known for his art, performance art, and music, which often express social and political messages. As a musician and singer, O'Moore has used the pseudonyms "justXx" and "King and Pauper" artistically. Previously he periodically appeared with his ex-wife, using the name "Simpleminded". Some of his music is characterized by social political messages, where he periodically uses profanity, such as in his anti-war song "God damn the war"(2010) and several of his raps, including "War and More" (2011). His music has received periodic radio play on NRK.

The art of O'Moore has been featured in a growing number of exhibitions, most recently at Stiklestad National Culture Centre (Stiklestad Nasjonale Kultursenter), Design and Architecture Norway (Design og arkitektur Norge) and Cultural Church Jakob (Kulturkirken Jakob).

O'Moore has also done minor voiceover work for various film projects, such as for the film Yohan: The Child Wanderer and in the documentary "Med rett til å kapre", broadcast on NRK. O'Moore appeared in a cameo role in the series Okkupert, broadcast on TV2 and streamed on Netflix.

== Personal life ==
In 2000, O'Moore married the Norwegian Hildegunn Marie Tønnessen, they moved to Norway shortly thereafter and have three children together. He and his family have previously lived extended periods of time in Greece since 2001. In the Fall of 2017 he filed for separation and the divorce was finalized in 2018. Following the divorce he has had shared custody of their three common children. O'Moore married Helene Harstad on Sicily in May 2019. For ideological reasons, O'Moore has not owned a personal vehicle most of his adult life and has lived for a number years in an off-grid cabin in the forest in Greipstad in Songdalen Municipality in Southern Norway. He currently resides in Kristiansand.

== Health ==
In January 2013 it was revealed in an interview in Fædrelandsvennen that O'Moore had been diagnosed with follicular lymphoma in the Fall of 2012, a form of cancer which, while indolent, is generally considered medically incurable after Stage I.

== Awards and recognition ==
O'Moore has received various awards for his humanitarian work and social activism.

- Focus Award (Civil Service Award) (2013)
- Bridgebuilder Award (2015)
- MLK Non-Violence Award (2017)
- LGBT+ Pride Award (2017)
- The Garden of the Righteous (2018)

== Discography ==
- My Friend – single (2009/2012)
- God damn the war – single (2011)
- War and More – single (2011)
- Christmas Song – single (2011)
- Recuerdo – single (2012)
- Hellige natt – single (2014)
- Que locura – single (2014)
- Para siempre – single (2015), under the pseudonym Chris Padrino
- Om vi gir faen – single (2016)
- Different Worlds – single (2011 / 2016)
- Fuck or fight – single (2018)
- What they say – single (2023)
- As I Be – EP (2023)
- Gamle voner – single (2025)
- Voices from Studio 214 – EP (2025)
- More Voices from Studio 214 – EP (2025)
- Chest of Drawers – single (2025)
- Only Way – single (2025)
- The Epilogue – EP (2025)
- Didn't fall – single (2025)
- Didn't fall again – single (2025)
