= Serigne Mbayé (politician) =

Senegalese Spanish activist and politician

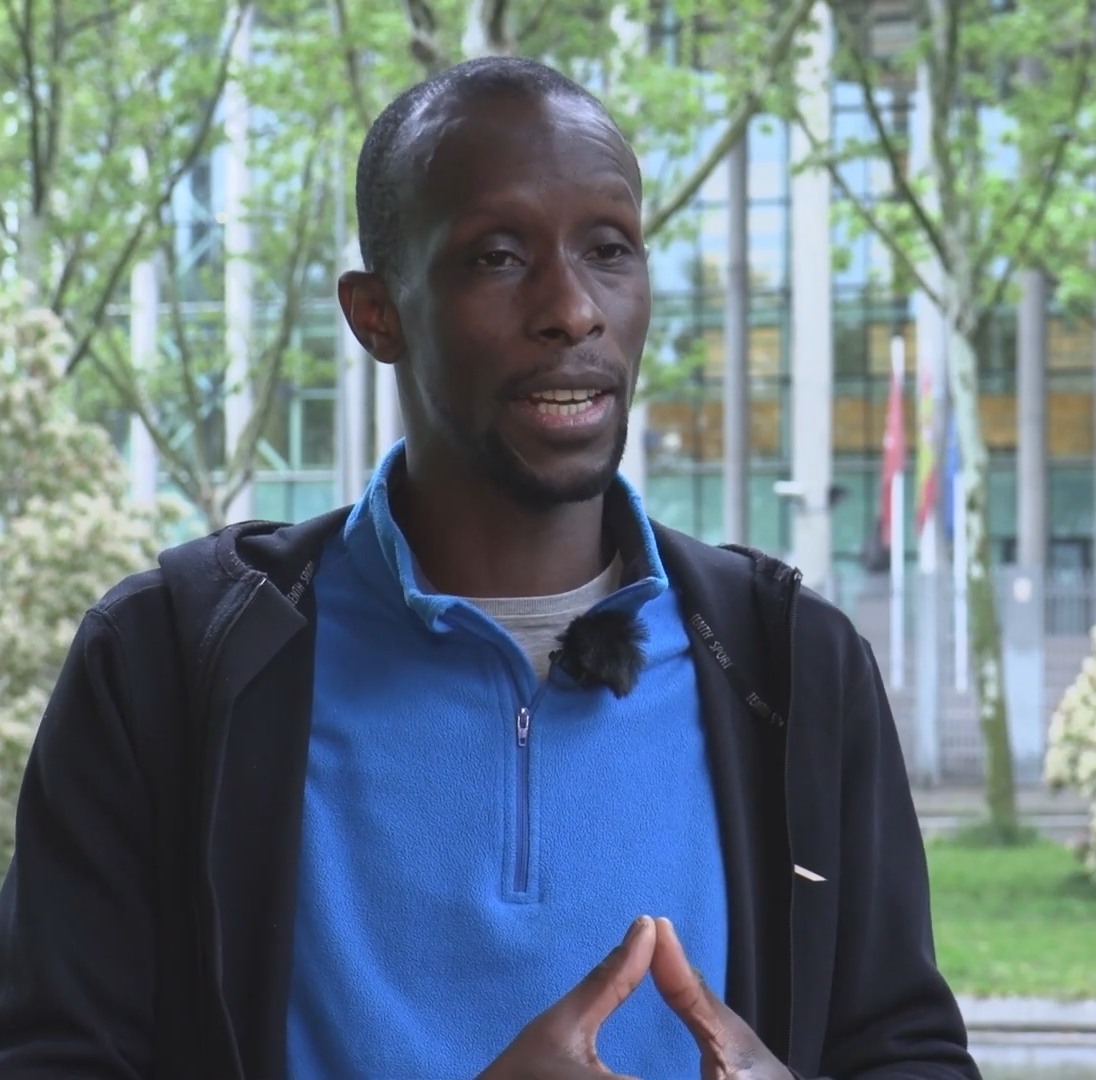

Serigne Mbayé Diouf (born 1975) is a Senegalese and Spanish activist and politician. He migrated to Spain in 2006 due to reduced opportunities in fishing in Senegal. He lived as a hawker on the streets of Madrid and set up a trade union, the Sindicato Popular de Vendedores Ambulantes, to advocate for those involved in the same trade. A member of Podemos, he served in the Assembly of Madrid from 2021 to 2023, as its first black member.

== Biography ==
Mbayé was born in Kayar, Senegal. After his baccalaureate, he became a fisherman, as was his family's tradition. He fished for ten years, until climate change and the rise of European trawlers reduced the economic viability of his work.

In 2006, Mbayé was one of 95 passengers on a small boat that crossed from Saint-Louis, Senegal to Tenerife in the Canary Islands. He was then transferred to mainland Spain, where he found accommodation with a friend. He worked as a hawker selling CDs on the streets of Madrid. After taking educational courses, he moved on to working in construction and agriculture in 2009, and once his immigration status was regularised the following year, he worked in administration.

Mbayé set up a trade union for hawkers in 2008, the Sindicato Popular de Vendedores Ambulantes. The salespeople and their union are known as Manteros, after the mats from which they sell their ware. He said that the organisation's aim is to move the vendors into employment, and to make the public aware of the bureaucratic difficulties that prevent some migrants from working legally.

Mbayé was approached by the left-wing party Podemos to stand in the 2021 Madrilenian regional election. He was elected, becoming the first black member of the Assembly of Madrid. He said "There will always be attacks but from now on, there is a black person in the chamber. Whether people like me or not, they now know that I am part of society, and that there is diversity in Madrid and in the world".

During the election campaign, far-right party Vox threatened to deport Mbayé, despite his naturalisation as a citizen of Spain. This threat was criticised by Vox consultant Bertrand Ndongo, who was born in Cameroon.

Mbayé was the subject of the 2023 documentary Serigne vs the EU, produced by Al Jazeera as part of their Witness strand. The title refers to his trip to Brussels to argue in favour of fairer fishing and border policy between the European Union and Senegal. The film was nominated for an International Emmy Award for Best Documentary.

Mbayé volunteered on the Global Sumud Flotilla to Gaza, aboard the Sirius. He was detained by the Israeli Navy.
