= Ewa Jasiewicz =

Polish–British freelance journalist, social and human rights activist

Ewa Jasiewicz is a Polish–British freelance journalist and human and environmental activist. Her activism focuses on anti-capitalism and climate change and has engaged in solidarity campaign in Iraq, Palestine and Syria. She was one of the journalists in the Gaza Strip during the First Gaza War.

== Education and activism ==
Ewa Jasiewicz was born in London to an immigrant Polish family of the Anders' Army. She was educated in anthropology at the Goldsmith College. After her graduation she went into social work and practices as a freelance journalist. In 2008, she went to the Gaza Strip as a freelance journalist and reported extensively on the 2008/2009 Hamas-Israeli war known as Operation Cast Lead. She reported from Gaza and Iraq and her reports were published in The Independent, The Daily Telegraph, Le Monde Diplomatique and The Guardian.

On 31 May 2010, Jasiewicz and other human rights activists were intercepted at sea by Israeli commandos while travelling to the Gaza Strip in a ship convoy intending to breach the naval blockade of Gaza. She has participated in a number of climate and solidarity activism including No Dash for Gas, Fuel Poverty Action, Witness Syria and Polish Campaign of Solidarity with Palestine. She is an organizer of Unite the Union with migrant and casual workers.

Jasiewicz sparked outrage in Poland in 2010 after she and a former Israeli airforce pilot Yonatan Shapira printed "Free Gaza and Palestine" on a wall in the former territory of the Warsaw Ghetto, the largest Nazi ghetto, where hundreds of thousands of Jews were killed, starved to death, or were deported to death camps during the Holocaust. Jasiewicz described her action as "a small act of unarmed resistance".
