= Amin Abu Rashid =

Palestinian-Dutch activist

Amin Abu Rashid (aka Amin Abu-Ibrahim) (aka Abu Eenarm)
- Born: 1966 or 1967 (age 59–60)
- Citizenship: Dutch

Amin Abu Rashid, nicknamed "Amin Abu-Ibrahim" (born 1966 or 1967 (age 59–60)), is a Palestinian-Dutch national, best known for his activism for Hamas and Gaza-bound flotillas.

According to a U.S. government exhibit and other sources, Rashid was a member of the Al-Aqsa Foundation in Rotterdam. In 2009, the Palestine News Network reported that Rashid was the Secretary General of the Popular Forum in the Netherlands. In December 2009, Middle East Monitor described him as the head of a delegation from the Conference of Palestinians in Europe.

De Telegraaf reported in June 2011, that Rashid had arranged financing and the purchase of a ship for the flotilla, and trained with the crew. As a second flotilla was being formed in June 2011, Israeli Public Affairs and Diplomacy Minister Yuli Edelstein said that the participation of Abu Rashid proved that this is not a humanitarian flotilla.

In 2023, Dutch authorities arrested Rashid and his adult daughter Israa for allegedly sending approximately $12.7 million to Hamas and participating in an organization who purpose is to support Hamas, in breach of EU sanctions. Rashid was released from pretrial detention in May 2024. In June 2025, Abu Rashid was designated along with his daughter, Israa, by the United States Department of the Treasury's Office of Foreign Assets Control (OFAC) as a Hamas operative in Europe who fundraised for and transferred money to Hamas.
