= Jordanian Engineers Association =

- Jordanian Engineers Association
- نقابة المهندسين الأردنيين
- Founded: 1948
- Headquarters: Amman
- Location: Jordan
- Key people: Ahmad Samara
- Website: www.jea.org.jo

The Jordanian Engineers Association (in Arabic: نقابة المهندسين الأردنيين) was established as a society for engineers in 1948, and was licensed in 1949. The first general assembly of the Engineering Professionals Association was established in 1958. Tawfiq Marar became the first Engineers' Association president. The Association has 11 branches in Jordan. There are two centers in Amman and Jerusalem. The first law of the Association was enacted in 1972.

The Association has an independent legal personality run by a board elected by the general assembly in accordance with the provisions of the association law, and the association president represents it before the courts, administrative entities, and other departments.

The Association makes an annual report stating its achievements and clarifying its financial position in financial reports. Every fund of the association also makes its respective annual report, and the administrative and financial reports are presented to the general assemblies for approval.

== Membership ==
As of 2017, the JEA had 143549 Registered Members, divided into six engineering chapters. Approximately 25% of its members are female, although this is expected to rise to 30% within the next 5 years.
