= Ávila (surname) =

- Origin: Portugal, Spain
- Distinctions: "de Ávila", "d'Ávila" "Dávila"

Ávila is a Spanish or Galician surname, originally de Ávila (who comes from a city named Ávila, most likely Ávila, Spain).

Notable people with the surname include:

(Alphabetical by surname)

- Alex Avila (born 1987), American baseball player
- Alonso de Ávila (fl. 1520s), Spanish conquistador
- Amelio Robles Ávila (1889–1984), Mexican revolutionary
- Andrea Ávila (born 1970), Argentine long and triple jumper
- Artur Avila (born 1979), Brazilian mathematician
- Bobby Ávila (1924–2004), American baseball player
- Bonifacio Ávila (1950–2026), Colombian boxer
- Charles F. Avila (1906–2000), American electrical engineer
- Danny Ávila (born 1995), Spanish electro house DJ and producer
- Diego Avila (born 1980), Argentine field hockey player
- Eva Avila (born 1987), Canadian singer
- Gustavo Ávila (born 1938), Venezuelan jockey
- Héctor Ávila (born 1972), Dominican Republic boxer
- Jim Avila (1956–2025), American television journalist
- John Avila, American bassist from Oingo Boingo
- Juan Tomás Ávila Laurel (born 1966), Equatoguinean writer
- Lixion Avila (born 1950), American weather forecaster
- Luinder Avila (born 2001), Venezuelan baseball player
- Pedro Ávila (born 1997), Venezuelan baseball player
- Ricardo Ávila (born 1997), Panamanian footballer
- Robbie Avila (born 2003), American basketball player
- Rodrigo Ávila (born 1964), Salvadoran politician
- Saint Teresa of Ávila (1515–1582), Roman Catholic saint, 16th Century mystic
- Sandra Ávila Beltrán (born 16 October 1960), one of the first female drug traffickers to reach the level of "Boss" in the Mexican cartels and one of the inspirations for the novel Queen of the South and its spinoff television series
- Sergio Ávila (born 1985), former Mexican footballer
- Steve Avila (born 1999), American football player
- Thiago Ávila (born 1986), Brazilian humanitarian activist
- Yiye Ávila (1925–2013), Puerto Rican evangelist

- Adolfo Dávila (born 1965), Mexican filmmaker
- Alberto Dávila (born c. 1960), Mexican-American boxer
- Alexandru Davila (1862–1929), Romanian dramatist, diplomat, public administrator, and memoirist, son of Carol Davila
- Carol Davila (1828–1884), Romanian physician, physicist and general of French origin
- Carlos Dávila (1887–1955), Chilean statesman
- Carlos Dávila (chess player) (born 1971), Nicaraguan chess master
- Carlos Lage Dávila (born 1951), Cuban politician
- Desiree Davila, (b. 1983) American Olympic marathoner
- Diego Ávila (born 1961), Bolivian economist and politician
- Enrico Caterino Davila (1576–1631), Italian historian
- Fidel Dávila Arrondo (1878–1962), Spanish army officer
- Guillermo Dávila (born 1955), Venezuelan actor and singer
- José Antonio Dávila (1898–1941), Puerto Rican poet
- Karen Davila (born 1970), Filipina newscaster and broadcast journalist
- Luis Davila (disambiguation), several people
- Marielena Davila (born 1992), Venezuelan actress and singer
- Marisa Davila (born 1997), American actress
- Miguel R. Dávila (1856–1927), President of Honduras
- Mónica Farro Dávila (born 1976), Uruguayan theatrical supervedette, actress and dancer
- Nick Davila (baseball) (born 1998), American baseball player
- Nick Davila (football) (born 1985), American football player
- Nicolás Gómez Dávila (1913–1994), Colombian philosopher
- Pedrarias Dávila (Pedro Arias de Ávila) (1440–1531), colonial administrator
- Pedro Ortiz Dávila ("Davilita") (1912–1986), Puerto Rican singer
- Robert R. Davila (born 1932), American advocate for the deaf, Assistant Secretary of Education, and President of Gallaudet University
- Rudolph B. Davila (1916–2002), American Medal of Honor Recipient, World War II
- Ulises Dávila (born 1991), Mexican association football player
- Virgilio Dávila (1869–1943), Puerto Rican poet, educator, politician and businessman
