= 2026 Global Sumud Flotilla =

Attempt to break the Israeli blockade of the Gaza Strip

Global Sumud Flotilla

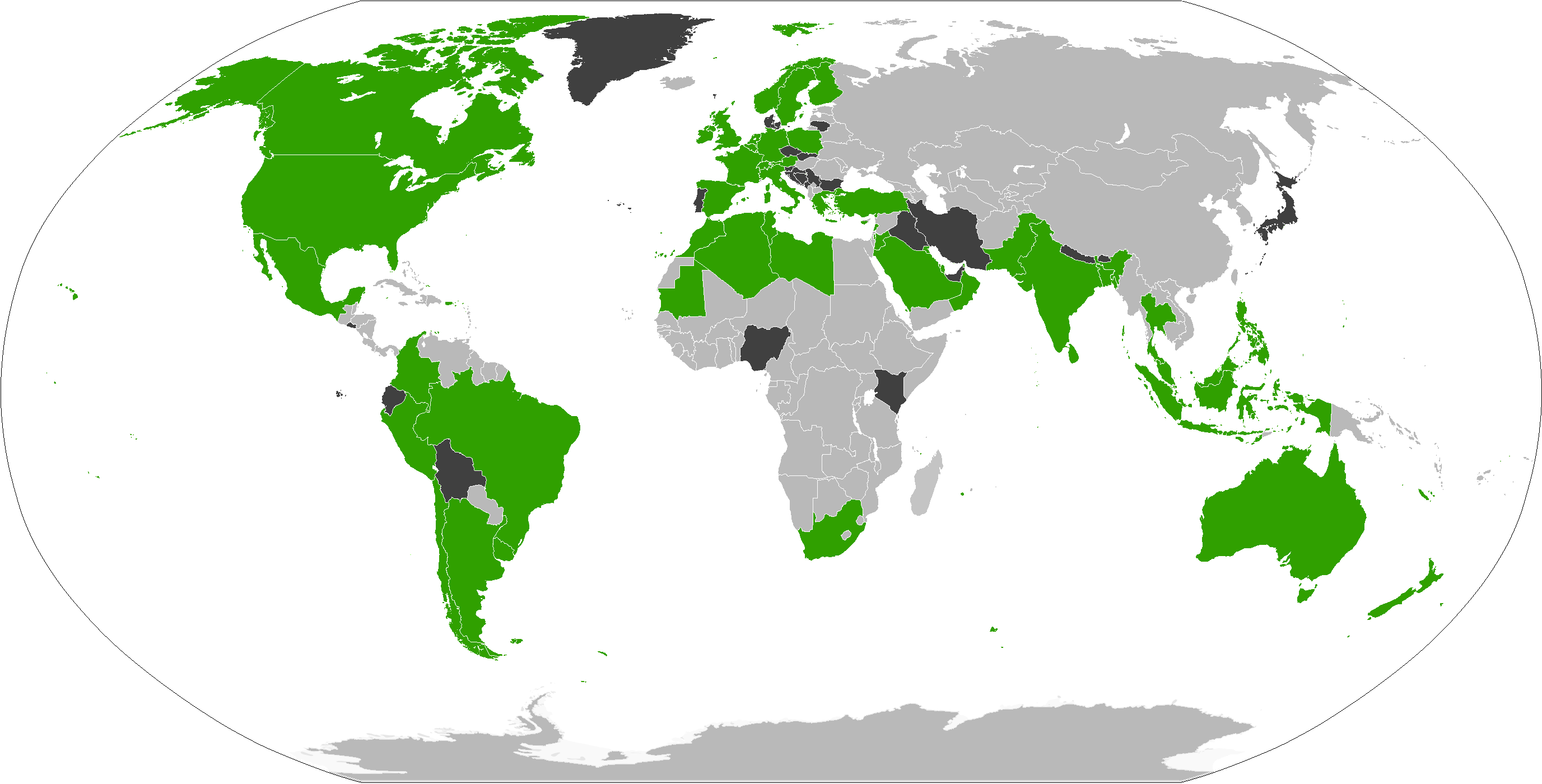
- Participating countries according to the GSF's official list Countries whose nationals participated in previous editions but for which records confirm there are no participants in this edition
- Abbreviation: GSF
- Formation: July 2025; 1 year ago
- Founder: Freedom Flotilla Coalition; Global Movement to Gaza; Maghreb Sumud Flotilla; Sumud Nusantara
- Type: Civil society; Humanitarian coalition
- Region served: Gaza Strip, Mediterranean region
- Methods: Break the Gaza blockade, deliver humanitarian aid and establish a humanitarian corridor
- Website: https://globalsumudflotilla.org/

The 2026 Global Sumud Flotilla was a civilian maritime mission organized by the Global Sumud Flotilla and the Freedom Flotilla Coalition (FFC) to challenge the Israeli naval blockade of Gaza and deliver humanitarian aid. Israel boarded several ships of the flotilla off Crete on the night of 29-30 April 2026, before the flotilla could reach its destination, and arrested members of the crew, deporting most of them directly to Greece but detaining Saif Abu Keshek and Thiago Avila for 10 days. The flotilla withdrew to Turkey then sailed again, with a further interception and boardings taking place on 18 May off Cyprus, resulting in over 400 activists being detained and transferred to Israel before their eventual release. The only boat that reached the Gaza Strip was Kasr-i-Sadabab, however, its wreckage arrived without any crew on board.

== Background ==
The Freedom Flotilla Coalition is an international network of grassroots organizations that has organized multiple missions to Gaza since 2010, aiming to break the Israeli blockade and draw global attention to the humanitarian crisis in the enclave. An earlier mission saw the interception of the coalition's vessel, Madleen, by Israeli forces in June 2025, during which volunteers including a member of the European Parliament and journalists were detained and deported.

After the October 7 attacks of 2023 and during the ensuing Gaza war, Israel intensified its blockade on the Gaza Strip, labeling it as a total blockade denying the entry of food, water, medicine, fuel and electricity, causing high risk of famine and a humanitarian crisis that scholars have described as genocide. Due to Israeli checkpoints into Gaza which predate the October 7 attacks, the Israeli government and Israel Defense Forces (IDF) have controlled the entrance of humanitarian aid into Gaza, with aid delivery disrupted multiple times over the years, either via Israeli government blockades or Israeli civilian protests. Additionally, since March 2, 2025, very little humanitarian aid has been allowed into Gaza, with concerns about famine in Gaza being raised by the Integrated Food Security Phase Classification (IPC). Israel has announced that any action that leads to breaking the siege of Gaza will be met with failure.

== Planning ==
In December 2025, the Global Sumud Flotilla announced their interest in organizing a new flotilla that would take place in the spring of 2026, this time with the aim to include at least 100 ships, with 3,000 participants (1,000 of which to be medics that would later stay in the Gaza Strip) from 70 countries. In January 2026 the Malaysian government confirmed they would support a second Flotilla and that the government would be directly involved in the initiative, its planning and execution.

It was later announced that the first convoy was scheduled to depart from Barcelona on 29 March 2026 (with departures from Tunisia and Italy also confirmed). In parallel to the sea mission it was announced that there would be "a new big movement regarding the land, the new Sumud land convoy" from North Africa and South Asia. On 5 February 2026, the Nelson Mandela Foundation, a South African-based charity, announced that it would be sponsoring another flotilla aid convoy to the Gaza Strip in March 2026.

In June 2026, the Global Sumud Flotilla announced plans for a new mission with the goal of contining to challenge the Israeli naval blockade and organize additional civilian-led aid convoys. Organizers said that they were preparing for renewed participation by international activists following the May 2026 detentions and deportations connected to the previous flotilla attempt.

== April ==
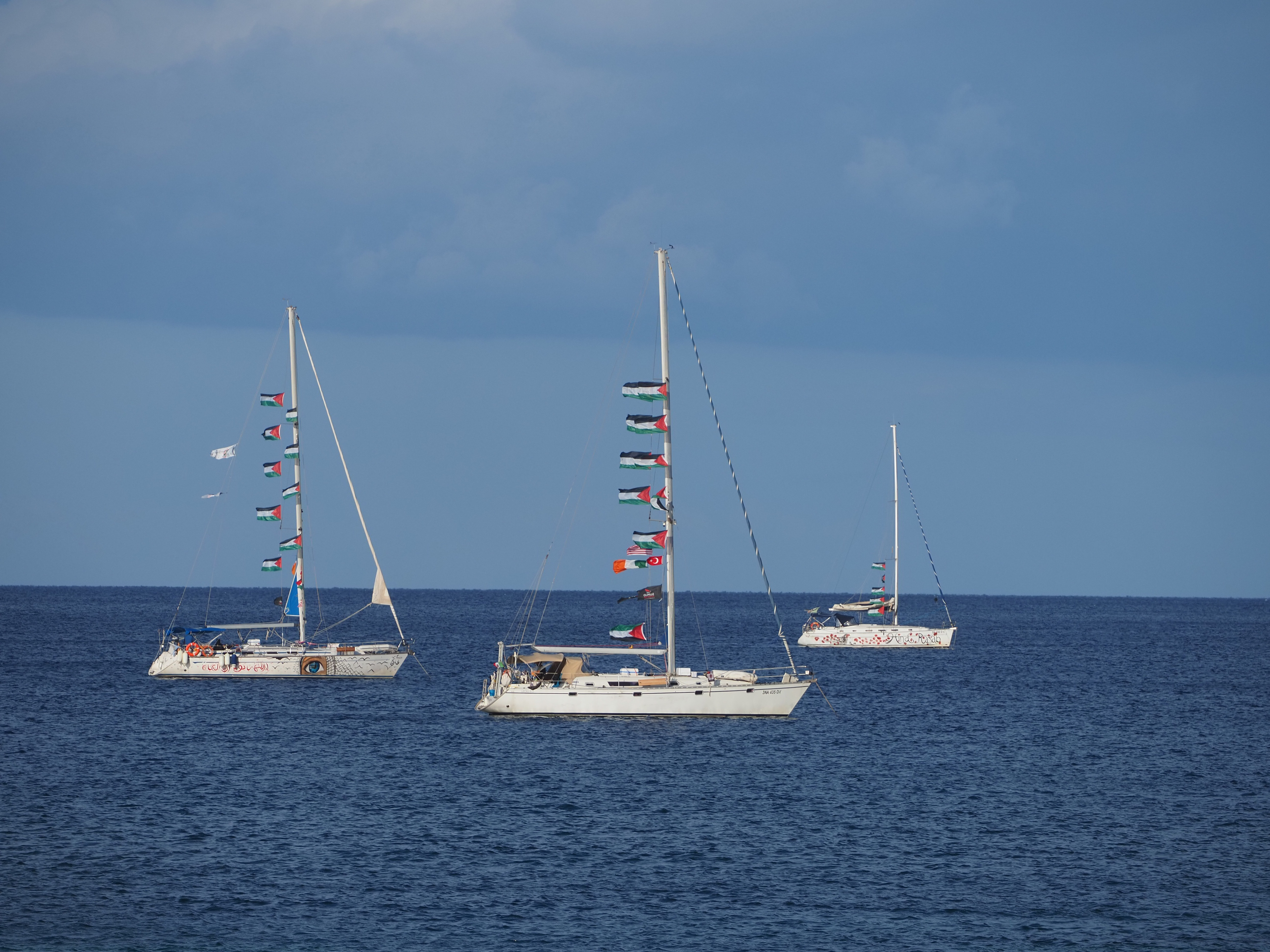
Boats of the flotilla in Ierapetra after its interception

Beginning on April 10, boats set out from Marseille and Naples, to join others from Barcelona and form a flotilla of 58 boats carrying humanitarian aid and aiming to break the blockade.

In the early hours of April 30, the IDF intercepted 22 boats of the convoy off Crete. 181 people were detained, including Pablo Giachello, an Argentine provincial deputy. The IDF stated it would transfer the activists to Greece; however two activists, Saif Abu Keshek and Thiago Avila, were taken to Israel, where they were detained for an additional 10 days. Allegations subsequently emerged regarding the mistreatment of Saif Abu Keshek and Thiago Avila.

== May ==
Following this first interception, the remaining boats regrouped in Turkey, and 54 vessels sailed again for Gaza, this time from Marmaris, on 14 May. On 18 May, Israeli forces boarded vessels of the flotilla off Cyprus, some 250 nautical miles from Gaza. 430 participants were forcibly removed from vessels in the flotilla and put on board Israeli ships. They were then transported to Ashdod port and detained in Israel.

On 21 May, Israel deported all of the "foreign activists" to Istanbul, Turkey. Multiple flotilla activists alleged physical abuse and sexual abuse, including rape, while in detention, which Israeli authorities denied. 'Dozens' of participants suffered suspected rib fractures, many consequently experiencing breathing difficulties, and at least three people required hospitalization. One report listed, among 180 detainees, 35 fractures, five head wounds, and 14 sexual assaults.

== Responses to the interceptions ==
=== Crete interception ===
After the first interception (off Crete) and with Spanish national Saif Abu Keshek detained in Israel, the Spanish Ministry of Foreign Affairs summoned the chargé d'affaires of the Israeli embassy in Madrid and strongly condemned the operation. Official sources indicated that around 30 Spanish nationals were among those detained, and the Spanish government stated that consular protection mechanisms had been activated.

Several governments and human rights organizations described the interception as potentially violating international maritime law.

However, Israeli officials stated that the flotilla was attempting to break the maritime blockade of Gaza and was therefore operating illegally under Israeli interpretation of the blockade.

=== Cyprus interception ===
In May 2026, after Israeli forces intercepted the Global Sumud Flotilla off Cyprus, Itamar Ben-Gvir released videos showing him taunting detained activists. The footage showed activists kneeling with their hands tied behind their backs, while Ben-Gvir called for them to be imprisoned for a long period. The foreign ministries of several countries, including France, Canada, the Netherlands, Portugal, Spain, Italy, South Korea, Sweden, Switzerland, Greece, Germany, Poland, Qatar, Slovenia, Turkey, Austria, Belgium, Colombia, the United Kingdom and New Zealand condemned the treatment of the detained activists.

Later that month, France banned Ben-Gvir from entering the country, with French Foreign Minister Jean-Noël Barrot citing Ben-Gvir's "reprehensible actions towards French and European citizens" who were passengers on the Global Sumud Flotilla. Poland also imposed a five-year entry ban on Ben-Gvir over his treatment of detained activists. Ireland also prohibited Itamar Ben Gvir and finance minister Bezalel Smotrich from entering the country, citing behavior against 2026 Global Sumud Flotilla activists and anti-Palestinian statements.

Following the release of the detainees, multiple flotilla activists alleged sexual abuse, including rape, while in detention, which Israeli authorities denied. A number of countries declared their intention to institute legal proceedings against Israel for abduction, kidnapping, torture and sexual assault. On June 15, 2026, four Australian women met with Australian Foreign Minister Penny Wong and accused Israeli soldiers of torturing and raping them, prompting the Australian Federal Police to launch an investigation.

== Aftermath ==
Despite the mission's failure to deliver its activists to the Gaza Strip, the crewless Kasr-i-Sadabab eventually reached the coast near Al-Mawasi in southern Gaza. Local residents gathered around the vessel and recovered materials that could still be used amid ongoing shortages of basic goods and energy supplies. Footage of the discovery was later shared by Sumud Flotilla-affiliated social media accounts. The Five Star Movement party in Italy used the fact that Kasr-i-Sadabab reached the shores of Al-Mawasi as proof of the "worth" of the mission. The Global Sumud Flotilla framed the occurrence as a symbolic victory.

Another boat was towed by the Lebanese Navy and kept at the port of Tyre. The boat was adorned with Palestinian flags, and it had an inscription stating "Stop genocide".
