= Battle of Carazúa =

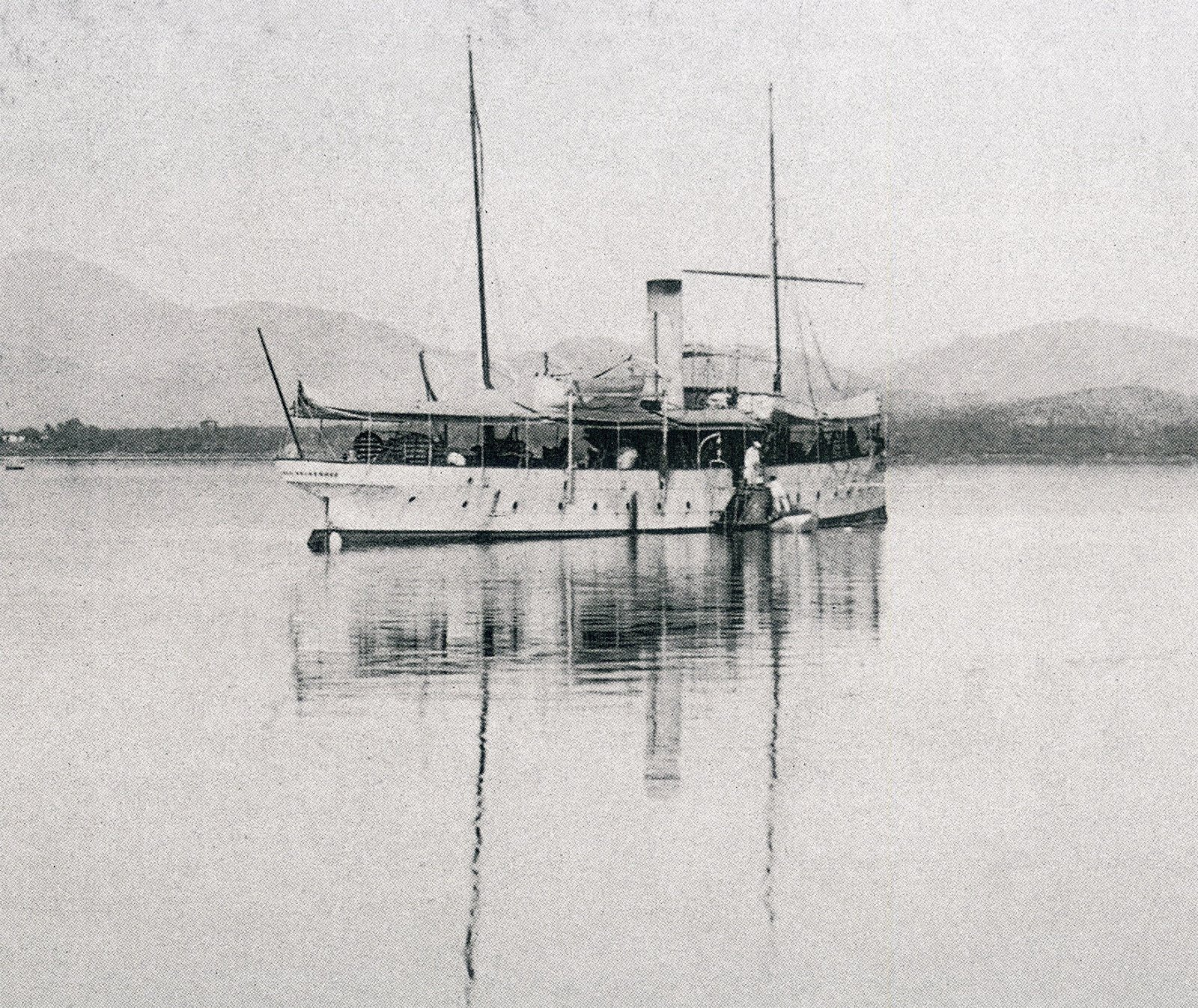
- Gunboat Miranda of the Venezuelan expedition
Date	September 13, 1901
Location	Riohacha, Colombia
Result	Colombian victory

Belligerents
United States of Venezuela; Colombian Liberal Party	Republic of Colombia; Conservatives

Commanders and leaders
José Antonio Dávila; Benicio Giménez; Abelardo Gutiérrez; Carmelo Castro	Juan B.Tovar; Carlos Albán; Ramón Amaya

Strength
3,000 soldiers 3 gunboats	1,500 soldiers

Casualties and losses
Approximately 500 dead, wounded and prisoners	Approximately 400 dead

The Battle of Carazúa (Spanish: Batalla de Carazúa) was a battle of the Thousand Days' War. It took place on 13 September 1901 between Colombia and Venezuela.

== Background ==
The Venezuelan expedition was President Cipriano Castro's response to an invasion that took place in Táchira two months earlier, led by the Venezuelan Carlos Rangel Garbiras and supported by the government of Bogotá. For his expedition, Gabiras had received Colombian troops given by the government of that country to end the support that Castro gave to the liberal rebels.

== Battle ==
Castro's plan was a coordinated maneuver by Venezuelan forces and Colombian liberals. Two columns would enter Colombia to help Uribe Uribe: General Andrés Márquez would enter through Arauca. The other would go through La Guajira. To command the other column, Castro chose General José Antonio Dávila (1870-1925), considered militarily incompetent but one of his most loyal supporters. Colonel of the General Staff of the Restoring Army, he participated in the Castro revolution and defeated and arrested the caudillo José Manuel Hernández when he rose up against Castro. The other notable character was General Ramón Guerra (1841-1922), strategist of the Legalist Revolution, becoming the Minister of War and Navy of Crespo and Castro., Dávila was then appointed commander of said campaign that was baptized as the restoration expedition of the Atlantic to support the Colombian liberals made up of 4 battalions the Barcelona, Coro, La sagrada and Lara ( the Lara Battalion fell into defection at the beginning of the battle), armed with repeating Mauser rifles, 4 mountain guns and a machine gun, part of Maracaibo on August 28, 1901, a few days later, on September 3 The New York Herald has to publish on the front page a photo of the Venezuelan staff in campaign, that same day the flotilla that will support the expedition by sea will depart from the port of Maracaibo, the plan is to take Rio Hacha in La Guajira with the help of the liberal guerrillas Colombians, this action had to be quick and secret, it was now followed by everyone including Colombian President José Manuel Marroquín, who ordered General Carlos Alban to reinforce Rio Hacha by landing of fresh and well-ammunitioned troops, under the command of General Amaya, an order that is fully complied with when the French merchant ship "Alexander Bixio" is contracted and the Briceño Battalion disembarks to support the population of Riohacha and the Colombian garrison established there. The Venezuelan expedition was transported by sea aboard three warships (the Miranda, General Crespo, and Zumbador gunboats). When they arrived in front of Riohacha, the squadron bombarded the city for several hours, after which the troops disembarked. On September 13, a battle is fought in Riohacha, in the site of Carazúa, where the Venezuelans are defeated by the experienced Colombian troops, after several partial combats -the battle of Garapasera on the 22nd of that month would be the last encounter of the contest, the Venezuelans withdrew, in the direction of their land through Paraguaipoa and Sinamaica, but an outbreak of dysentery caused by the consumption of unhealthy water and the harassment of the riders of the Wayuu tribe under the command of chief Jose Dolores Arpushana caused significant casualties to the Venezuelans in their withdrawal.
