= Timeline of Bayamón, Puerto Rico =

History of Bayamón, Puerto Rico by century

The following is a timeline of the history of the municipality of Bayamón, Puerto Rico.

== 19th century ==
- 1772
  - Santa Cruz Church construction begins.
  - José Ramírez de Arellano becomes mayor.
- 1883 – Population: 15,752 in ayuntamiento (city); 125,277 in departamento (province).

== 20th century ==
- 1900 – First automobile is photographed in Bayamón
- 1905 – Mahogany tree planted in the plaza.
- 1908 – Plata Bridge built.
- 1910 – Farmacia Serra (pharmacy) building constructed.
- 1928 – Hurricane.
- 1932 – Hurricane.
- 1949 – Puerto Rico National Cemetery established.
- 1964
  - Universidad Católica de Bayamón established.
  - Santa Rosa Mall in business.
- 1970 – Population: 147,552.
- 1974
  - Vaqueros de Bayamón baseball club formed.
  - Juan Ramón Loubriel Stadium opens.
- 1977 – City flag design adopted.
- 1980 – Casa Alcaldía de Bayamón built.
- 1982 – Plaza Rio Hondo shopping mall in business.
- 1984 – Braulio Castillo Theater opens.
- 1988 – Coliseo Rubén Rodríguez (arena) opens.
- 1990 – Botanical garden established.
- 1997 – Carmen Delia Dipiní Theater opens.
- 1998 – Plaza del Sol shopping mall in business.
- 1999 – Puerto Rico Bayamón football club formed.
- 2000
  - Public Library building constructed.
  - Population: 203,499.

== 21st century ==
- 2001
  - May 11: Miss Universe 2001 beauty pageant held in Bayamón
  - Ramón Luis Rivera Jr. becomes mayor
- 2004 – Tren Urbano (regional transit) begins operating
- 2010 – Population: 208,116
- 2009 – an explosion and fire at the Cataño oil refinery
- 2011 – Bayamón Soccer Complex opens
- 2015 – Puerto Rico FC (football club) formed

== See also ==
- List of mayors of Bayamón, Puerto Rico
- National Register of Historic Places listings in Bayamón
- Timeline of Mayagüez, Puerto Rico, Ponce, San Juan

== Bibliography ==
=== in English ===
- M. de Magalhães (1898). "Bayamon". Colonial Business Directory of the Island of Puerto Rico. New York. OCLC 39940968.
- Frederick A. Ober (1899), "Inland Towns: Bayamon", Puerto Rico and its Resources, New York: D. Appleton and Co.
- "Porto Rico: Bayamon". Official Commercial Directory of Cuba, Porto Rico and the Entire West Indies, with Bermuda. New York: Spanish-American Directories Company. 1901. pp. 368+.
- Charles Hartzell, ed. (1903), "Sketches of Cities, Towns, and Villages: Bayamon", Register of Porto Rico for 1903, San Juan: Louis E. Tuzo and Co., p. 175
- "Bayamon". Commercial Guide and Business Directory of Porto Rico. New York: F.E. Platt. 1910. pp. 143–146.
- Ernst B. Filsinger (1922), "Bayamon", Commercial Travelers' Guide to Latin America, Washington, DC: Government Printing Office
- Federal Writers' Project (1940), "Bayamon", Puerto Rico: a Guide to the Island of Boriquén, American Guide Series, New York: University Society, hdl:2027/mdp.39015030579083, OCLC 245805 – via HathiTrust

=== in Spanish ===
- Manuel Ubeda y Delgado (1878). "Bayamon". Isla de Puerto Rico: estudio histórico, geográfico y estadístico de la misma (in Spanish). Puerto Rico. hdl:2027/inu.30000067744395. (reprint 1998)
- Ignacio Olazagasti, Catálogo de documentos históricos de Bayamón (in Spanish), Instituto de Historia y Cultura de Bayamón, OCLC 9685839 1979-1982 (8 vols.)
- Mario A. Rodríguez León (1985). Bayamón: notas para su historia (in Spanish). San Juan: Comité Historia de los Pueblos. OCLC 14643901. (2 vols.)
