= List of mayors of Bayamón, Puerto Rico =

The following is a list of mayors of the municipality of Bayamón, Puerto Rico.

== List of mayors ==
- José Ramírez de Arellano, circa 1772-1773
- Manuel de Guzmán, circa 1774
- Bernabé Dávila, circa 1775-1776
- Lucas de Fuentes, circa 1777-1799
- Juan Francisco de Fuentes, circa 1800-1802
- Tomás de Rivera, circa 1803
- Miguel Dávila, circa 1806
- Miguel Ramírez de Arellano, circa 1807
- Alonso Dávila, circa 1810
- Juan Francisco de Fuentes, circa 1812
- Francisco Ruiz and Peña, circa 1812-1813
- Luis Ramírez de Arellano, circa 1814
- Laureano Ramos, circa 1814
- Manuel de Villalba, circa 1818-1819
- Miguel de Andino, circa 1820
- Francisco Ruiz and Peña, circa 1820
- Alonso Dávila, circa 1821-1822
- Miguel de Andino, circa 1823-1824
- José Riguera, circa 1825-1826
- Pedro Vassallo, circa 1826
- Tomás Pacanins, circa 1827
- José de Rivera, circa 1828-1831
- Tomás Prieto, circa 1831
- Joaquín Goyena, circa 1832
- Miguel de Andino, circa 1837-1841
- Francisco de Paula Cepero, circa 1841-1843
- Antonio Padrón, circa 1843-1846
- Mariano Vassallo, circa 1847
- Tomás Prieto, circa 1847
- Ramón Suárez, circa 1849
- Arturo O’Neill, circa 1849
- Escolástico Fuentes, circa 1850
- Félix O’Neill, circa 1851-1852
- Andrés Vega, circa 1853
- Francisco Jiménez Prieto, circa 1856-1859
- Andrés Vega, circa 1860
- Francisco de Aguilar, circa 1861-1862
- Antonio de Aramburu, circa 1863-1864
- José Sicardó, circa 1864
- José Muñoz, circa 1867
- Andrés Vega, circa 1868
- Octavio Ortiz Zárate, circa 1870
- Eduardo Pardo, circa 1870
- G. Quiara, circa 1871
- Vicente Rodríguez, circa 1871
- Anastasio Maisonet, circa 1871-1872
- José Arvelo Calzadilla, circa 1874
- Marcial Colón, circa 1874-1875
- Manuel Fernández Umpierre, circa 1876-1879
- Bernardo Pérez, circa 1879-1880
- Manuel Capetillo, circa 1880-1881
- Manuel García Maitín, circa 1881-1883
- Bernardo Pérez, circa 1883-1884
- Eugenio Santaella and Cortón, circa 1884-1895
- José Alonso González, circa 1895-1897
- Manuel Valdés, circa 1897
- Félix Pérez Rivera, circa 1897-1898
- Juan Mateu García, circa 1898-1904
- Virgilio Dávila, 1905-1910

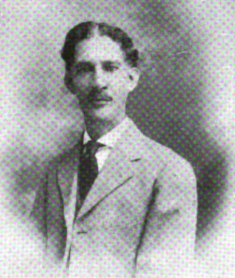
Hon. Manuel Gaetán Barbosa, Municipal Commissioner of Education, Bayamón c. 1921

- Manuel Gaetán Barbosa, circa 1910-1911
- Rafael Díaz Cintrón, circa 1912-1914
- Ignacio Carballeira Cañellas, circa 1915-1918
- José Oller Díaz, circa 1919-1920
- Ramón Luis Rodríguez, circa 1920-1924
- Enrique Ponsa Parés, circa 1924-1928
- José Dolores Miranda, circa 1928-1933
- Juan C. Rodríguez, circa 1933-1934
- Angel Rivera Rodríguez, circa 1934-1944
- Rafael Torrech Genovés, circa 1945-1949
- Ramón Espinosa, circa 1949-1953
- Rafael Torrech Genovés, circa 1953-1961
- Julio "Tulio" López Corbera, circa 1961-1965
- Julio Castro Rodríguez, circa 1965-1969
- Guillermo Campos Ayala, circa 1969-1973
- Manuel Aponte Borrero, circa 1973-1977
- Ramón Luis Rivera, 1977-2001
- Ramón Luis Rivera Jr., 2001-current

== See also ==
- Casa Alcaldía de Bayamón
- Timeline of Bayamón, Puerto Rico
