= Global March to Gaza =

2025 international march to Rafah border crossing

- Part of the Gaza war protests
- Date: Intended for June 15–19, 2025
- Location: Intended from Arish, Egypt, to Rafah border crossing with the Gaza Strip.
- Caused by: Blockade of the Gaza Strip; Gaza humanitarian crisis; Israeli war crimes; Gaza genocide
- Goals: Delivering humanitarian aid and establishing a humanitarian corridor
- Methods: Peaceful protest; protest camp
- Result: March cancelled, 16 June

Parties
International Coalition Against the Israeli Occupation: Trade unions; Human rights groups; Solidarity movements; Soumoud Convoy; Dignity Convoy	Arab Republic of Egypt: Egyptian National Police; Ministry of Foreign Affairs; Libyan National Army: Supreme Commander Khalifa Haftar; Government of Israel: Minister of Defense Israel Katz

Casualties
- Arrested: 200+ detentions prior to march; ~500 foreign activists deported

The Global March to Gaza (GMTG), also referred to as the Gaza Solidarity Convoy, was a civilian-led, international initiative to march from Arish, Egypt, to the Rafah border crossing with the Gaza Strip in Palestine, intended to begin on 15 June 2025. Participants planned to establish a protest camp on the Egyptian side of the border, with the goals of peacefully breaking the Israeli blockade of Gaza, providing humanitarian aid to the Gaza Strip, stopping the alleged genocide in Gaza, establishing a humanitarian corridor, and exposing Israeli war crimes. The Tunisian and Libyan delegation of the march, the Soumoud Convoy, began on 9 June in Tunis and passed Tripoli, before being blocked in Sirte by the Libyan National Army in eastern Libya, and cancelling the convoy after 13 arrests, on the same day as the march.

For the march, up to 4,000 people had planned to gather in Arish and march for a few days to the Egyptian border with the Gaza Strip. By 16 June, the march had been cancelled by organisers after more than 200 people had been detained in Cairo. Nearly 500 activists were deported, passports confiscated, and clashes occurred with Egyptian authorities near Ismailia. Among those detained were Irish politician Paul Murphy, a Turkish MP, and former U.S. diplomat Hala Rharrit. Organisers had requested that Egypt permit the march, intiailly vowing to continue attempts to reach Rafah. Israeli Minister of Defence Israel Katz strongly opposed the protest, declaring that the Israeli military would take action if necessary. The initiative evolved into a solidarity movement known as Global Movement to Gaza.

== Background ==
Since 2010, humanitarian aid boats have attempted to break the blockade of the Gaza Strip, and since the Gaza war began in October 2023, activists have protested the war in major capitals. The aid vessels have all been attacked or intercepted by Israel, mostly recently in June 2025.

=== Plans ===
The march was planned for 15 June 2025 and intended to last two to three days. Participants began assembling on June 12 in Cairo, Egypt as planned, heading for Al-Arish, prior to continuing on foot to the Rafah Border Crossing. Organisers planned to set up a three-day protest camp on the Egyptian side of the border, to peacefully press for the border to be opened and aid to be allowed in, prior to returning on Cairo on June 19.

=== Aims ===
The goals of the march were "stopping the genocide, delivering aid, breaking the siege, exposing IDF war crimes, and urging legal action against breaches of international law". Organisers have insisted that their goal is not to "forcibly enter Gaza", but instead attempt to establish a humanitarian corridor. The march was billed as one of the largest of its kind in recent years by media outlets.

== Arrests, deportations and cancellation ==
=== 12 June ===
On 12 June 2025, around 200 people who traveled to Cairo to join the march were detained and questioned by Egyptian authorities. According to Egyptian authorities, protest organisers, and airport officials, dozens of participants were subsequently deported, while others were either released or remained in custody. Among those detained were from Africa and Europe, as well as the United States and Australia.

=== 13 June ===
Egyptian authorities continued to detain or expel foreign nationals attempting to join the march the following day. Security services confirmed that 88 people had been detained and/or deported from Cairo airport, as well as other locations. Organisers stated that 40 activists at a "toll booth-turned-checkpoint" had their passports confiscated, while authorities suppressed protests. A Canadian student who was detained reported that people were stopped in hotels, ubers, cafés, and were "followed for a large portion of the morning", and a Maktoob media journalist wrote that Egyptian authorities had detained both activists and reporters.

According to the organisers, police set up checkpoints around 30 kilometers from Ismailia, near the Sinai Peninsula, on the way to Rafah, which lies nearly 300 kilometers further. Passengers without Egyptian passports were ordered to leave the vehicles. Mada Masr reported participants being attacked by security forces and civilians outside of Cario, at a checkpoint towards the city of Ismailia. A Member of European Parliament from Germany, Carola Rackete, stated she was forced onto a bus and sent back to Cairo, having been rejected at one of the checkpoints.

Based on video footage of the attacks, The New Arab reported that the civilians involved were likely baltagiya gangs, "used by the Egyptian government to attack its political opponents". However the outlet were unable to confirm such claims. The Jerusalem Post reported violent clashes between authorities and activists at the Ismailia checkpoint, where according to the Israeli newspaper, activists staged a sit-in. Organisers responded to the events describing them as "unprovoked violence against a peaceful global delegation".

=== 14 June ===
On 14 June, it was reported that the Irish citizens detained in Egypt had been released, including People Before Profit politician Paul Murphy, after authorities had confiscated passports. A Turkish MP stated he "was injured as a result of an attack" and former U.S. diplomat, Hala Rharrit, was also detained. According to The Telegraph, Murphy and others are awaiting deportation. NL Times reported that 35 Dutch citizens were deported, while 65 remained in Egypt.

=== 15 June ===
According to Egyptian security officials speaking to The National, nearly 500 activists have been deported, of which 200 were deported on arrival at Cairo airport, with the remainder detained near Ismailia. Organisers released a statement denouncing the attack by the alleged pro-government groups near Ismailia as "thuggery", stating that it "does not represent the will of the Egyptian people", and that "Our only goal was to advance to Rafah, break the blockade on our Palestinian brethren in Gaza, and stop the war." Protesters have vowed to remain in Egypt in an attempt to reach Rafah.

Haaretz reported that the march was "put on hold by organisers", citing the "sweeping crackdown" from Egyptian authorities.

=== 16 June ===
Organisers called for would-be participants to return home on 16 June, while calling for Egyptian authorities to release those arrested in Cairo over the weekend, including two lead organisers. According to a statement, participants had received varied responses from certain embassies, and rejected plans for alternative demonstrations. According to IOL, activists continued to arrive to Egypt for the march.

=== 17 June ===
Organisers announced in a statement that three participants were taken from a café in Cairo on 16 June, by plainclothes unidentified officers. One of the activists said they were all "blindfolded, beaten and interrogated", which was subsequently denied by two security officials. According to sources from Reuters, less than 30 participants remain detained as of 17 June.

== Organisers and participants ==
The civilian-led march is organised by the International Coalition Against the Israeli Occupation, a coalition of trade unions, human rights groups, and solidarity movements from over 32 countries, chaired by Palestinian activist Saif Abu Keshek. Organisers have stated that the march is secular and non-partisan, and it is supported by 150 non-governmental organizations and activists from more than 50 countries. Nelson Mandela's grandson Mandla Mandela is a member of the organising committee, who reported he had been detained in Egypt the lead up to the march.

Initially estimated at 2,000 to 3,000 participants, according to the organisation, around 4,000 people from more than 80 countries had arranged to fly to Cairo. All participants are volunteers covering their own expenses.

=== Soumoud Convoy ===
The Tunisian delegation of the march, dubbed the Soumoud or Steadfast Convoy (from Arabic: صمود, romanized: ṣumūd, lit. 'steadfastness'), left Tunis on 9 June, with approximately 1,000–1,500 people taking part, mostly from Tunisia, and also from Algeria, Libya, Mauritania, and Morocco. It crossed the Tunisia–Libya border, arrived in Tripoli, Libya, on 11 June, and was supported by Libya's Prime Minister and Foreign Minister. Two days later, the protest was halted at the Libyan city of Sirte heading east, and subsequently blocked by Libyan National Army commander Khalifa Haftar's forces.

The Egyptian Foreign Ministry stated that it would not permit the convoy to march to Rafah, citing the need for permits; a position supported by authorities in eastern Libya. On 15 June, the convoy retreated to the region of Misrata in west Libya and 13 participants had been arrested, whose release was demanded by the organisers. The next day, organisers cancelled the convoy's journey.

=== Dignity Convoy ===
On June 14, 2025, a humanitarian convoy named the Dignity Convoy left northern Lebanon, consisting of citizens, activists, and Palestinian refugees. The initiative coincided with the Soumoud Convoy, as part of the wider Arab movement's attempt to break the siege of Gaza.

=== Groups endorsing ===
Groups endorsing the march include:

- International Healthworkers Alliance for Justice
- Masafer Yatta Solidarity Alliance from Palestine
- Palestinian Youth Movement
- Code Pink
- Jewish Voice for Labour
- The Million Rural Women and the Landless Association in Tunisia
- India Palestine Solidarity Forum
- Irish Anti-War Movement

== Responses ==
=== Egypt ===
Officials in Cairo stated that marches on Egyptian territory require prior approval and strict procedures, especially for sensitive areas like the Rafah border. While expressing support for Palestinian activism, the Foreign Ministry stressed the need to follow national security regulations due to instability in Sinai. Authorities said the organisers had not secured the necessary permits through official channels, and that requests made outside state procedures would not be accepted.

=== International ===
United Nations special rapporteur for Gaza and Palestine, Francesca Albanese, expressed her support for the marchers and called for Egyptian authorities to "to use maximum restraint".

=== Israel ===
Israel's Minister of Defence, Israel Katz, stated that if Egypt fails to stop the march, the Israeli military would take action to order to prevent them marching into Gaza. Describing participants as "jihadist protesters", Katz expects that Egypt will prevent the arrival of the march.

=== Protesters ===
In a statement on 13 June, activists asserted that they "continue to urge the Egyptian government to permit this peaceful march, which aligns with Egypt’s own stated commitment to restoring stability at its border and addressing the ongoing humanitarian crisis in Gaza".

On 16 June, activists accused Egyptian authorities of forced deportation and being blocked from reaching the Rafah border with the Gaza Strip. According to participants, security forces prevented activists from reaching Ismailia using force, including the assault by plain-clothed individuals, followed by being forced to return to Cairo; and for dozens, having passports confiscated.

== Analysis ==
According to CNN, the march creates a dilemma for Egypt, which is trying to balance its relations with Israel and the United States with its public criticism of the civilian suffering in Gaza. The Washington Post described the events as casting "an uncomfortable spotlight on Egypt", as a country that both publicly condemns the aid restrictions and has "cracked down on pro-Palestinian activists".
