= Parque de las Ciencias =

Educational and recreational park in Bayamón, Puerto Rico

Parque de las Ciencias Luis A. Ferré
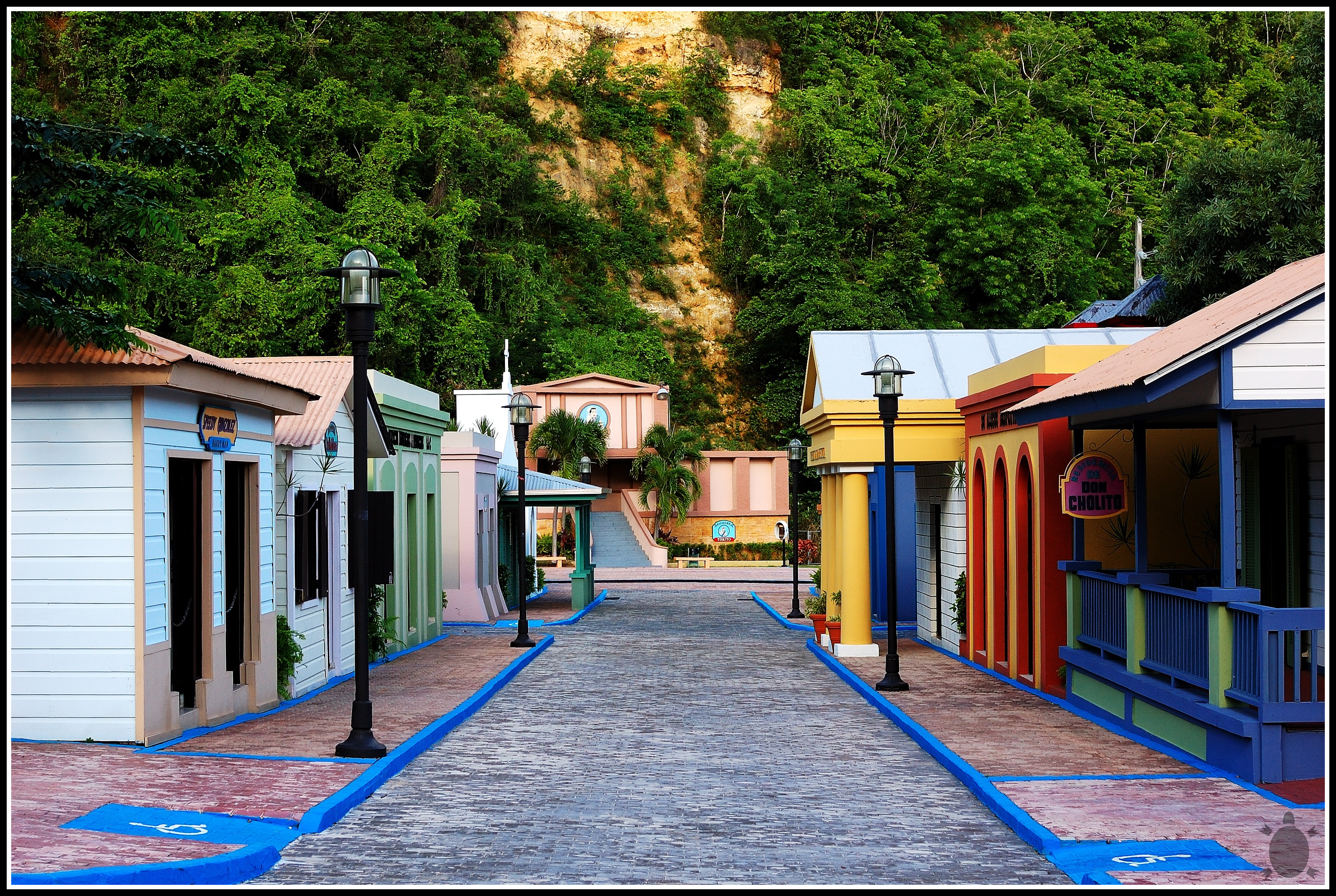
- El Pueblito de Torito at Parque de las Ciencias
- Interactive map of Parque de las Ciencias; Luis A. Ferré
- Location: Bayamón, Puerto Rico
- Coordinates: 18°24′38″N 66°09′36″W
- Status: Operating
- Opened: September 25, 1988; 37 years ago
- Owner: Municipality of Bayamón
- Operated by: Municipality of Bayamón (1988–2022); TV Educational Park Management, Inc. (2022–present)
- Theme: STEAM education
- Operating season: Year-round
- Area: 42 acres (17 ha)
- Website: Parque de las Ciencias PR

Parque de las Ciencias Luis A. Ferré is an educational and recreational park located in Bayamón, Puerto Rico, owned by the Municipality of Bayamón, focused on STEAM education. It is one of multiple touristic attractions inaugurated under the leadership of longtime mayor Ramón Luis Rivera and is named after former Governor of Puerto Rico Luis A. Ferré. After two major closings, in November 2022, the Municipality of Bayamón announced the contracting of TV Educational Park Management as the new operator of the park which reopened on September 18, 2024.

== Park features ==
The park occupies 42 acres (17 ha) and connects with several main highways. Some of the main features of the park are a natural observatory set on a hill at 285 feet (87m) above sea level, a zoo, and an artificial lake. It also features exhibitions of archaeology, space exploration, transportation, science and health, among many others. The park also includes a section dedicated to late comedian José Miguel Agrelot and child entertainer Joaquín Monserrat, who was most famous for his character "Pacheco". In October 2023, TV Educational Park Management announced a collaboration with Guinness World Records for a new attraction and exhibition at the park upon its reopening.

== Operations ==
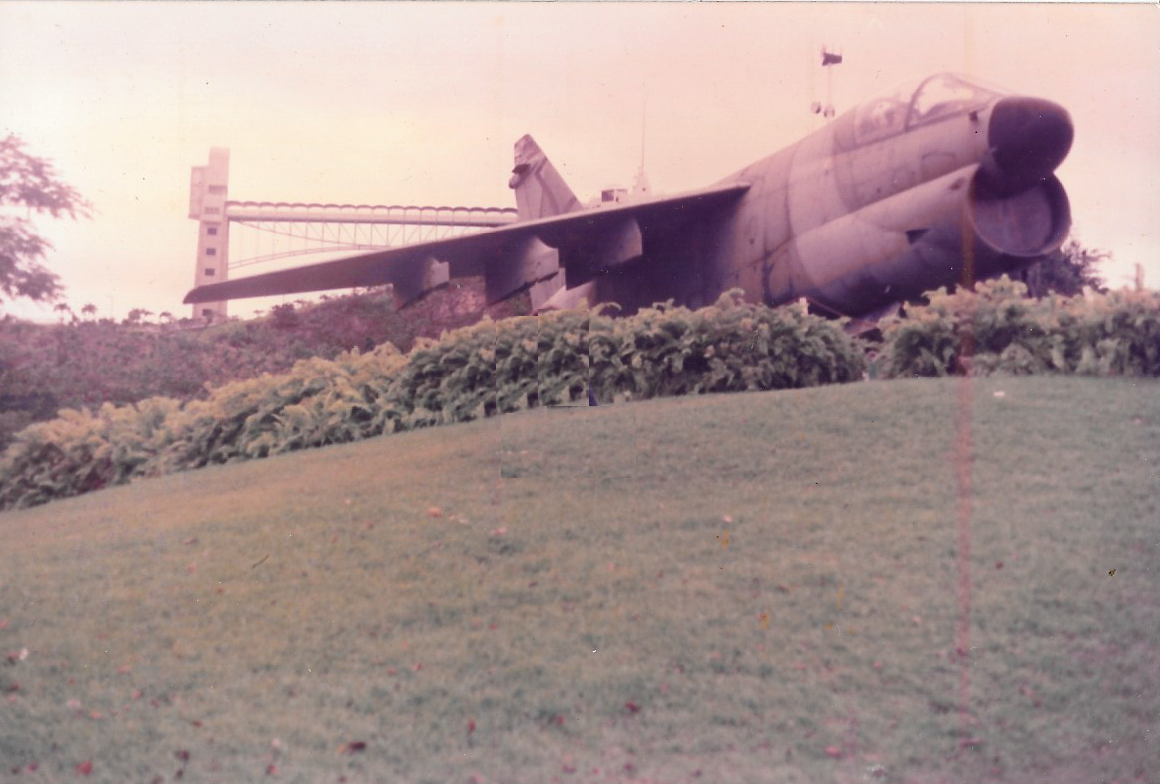
Military aircraft pictured on the lawn of the science park in 1996, with the park's observatory in the background.

The park has had two major closings, the first from February 2011 to January 10, 2016, for renovations that cost $11 million, and the second closing in September 2017, due to the aftermath of both Hurricane Irma and Hurricane Maria. In November 2022, the Municipality of Bayamón announced the contracting of TV Educational Park Management as the new operator of the park for a future reopening. The park officially reopened on September 18, 2024, at an estimated cost of $20 million and a corporate sponsorship from Claro Puerto Rico.

== See also ==
- Tourism in Puerto Rico
