= Saif Abu Keshek =

Palestinian-Spanish activist

- Abu Keshek in 2026
- Born: 1980 or 1981 (age 45–46); Askar Camp, West Bank, Palestine
- Other names: سيف أبو كشك; Saif Abukeshek
- Occupation: Activist

Saif Abu Keshek (Arabic: سيف أبو كشك) is a Palestinian-Spanish activist who campaigns against the Palestinian genocide in Gaza. He is a member of the Palestinian Community of Catalonia, the Intersindical Alternativa de Catalunya and the European Network of Trade Unions for Justice in Palestine.

== Early life ==
Born in the Askar refugee camp (West Bank), he arrived in Spain around 2003, and in the 2020s settled in Barcelona, together with his wife and three children. Since he married his wife Sally Issa in Sweden, he has triple nationality: Palestinian, Spanish and Swedish. He works for a multinational company.

== Activism ==
While in Palestine, he took part in the student movement and later in the international solidarity movement. Once he arrived in Spain, he continued to mobilize from the diaspora and joined the Palestinian Community of Catalonia and the Intersindical Alternativa de Catalunya as secretary of international relations. As a result of this position, he is coordinator of the European Network of Trade Unions for Justice in Palestine, and had relations with the Popular Conference for Palestinians Abroad (PCPE) until resignation in October 2025.

In 2025, as coordinator of the International Coalition Against the Israeli Occupation, he organized the Global March to Gaza, which aimed to be a walking march to Rafah. However, in Egypt he was detained and tortured for three days, and had to return to Catalonia. The same year, he was part of the steering committee of the Global Sumud Flotilla, along with figures such as Greta Thunberg, Nadir Al-Nuri and Kleoniki Alexopoulou. He abandoned the trip on an Italian coast as a precaution. As director of the Cyber Neptune shell shipping company, he managed the acquisition of the ships that were part of the expedition.

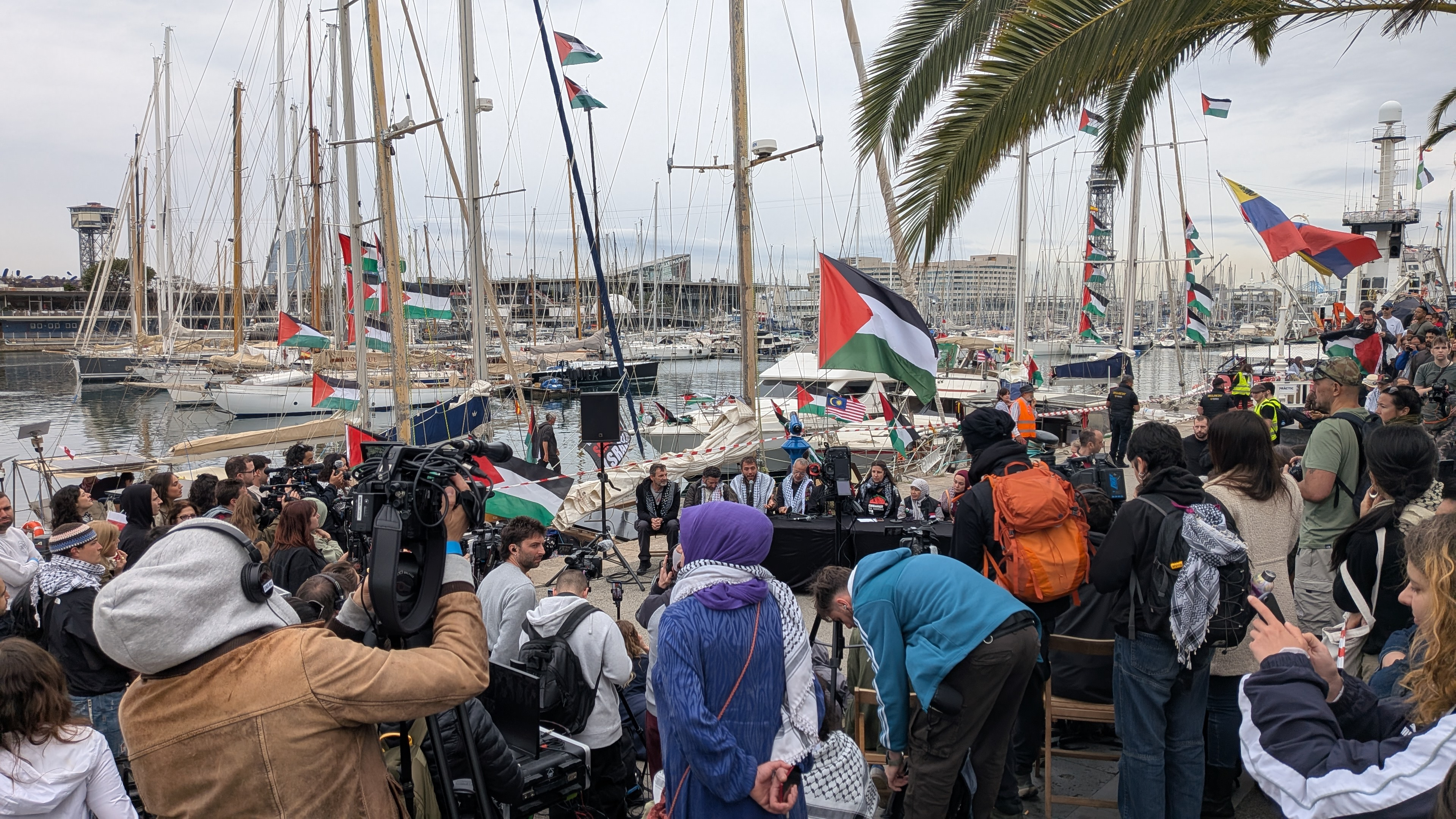
The Global Sumud Flotilla sets sail on April 12, 2026 in Barcelona.

Similarly, in 2026 he boarded the second Global Sumud Flotilla, in the capacity of an observer, with the intention of providing logistical support to the operation and disembarking again before reaching Israeli waters. However, Israeli authorities intercepted the ships near Crete, and detained him along with Thiago Ávila to be taken to Israel. Both reported torture and ill-treatment while in the custody of Israeli forces, and went on a hunger strike in protest until they were released. In response to the kidnapping, a demonstration was organized with nearly 2,000 attendees in front of the European Parliament Office in Barcelona, on Passeig de Gràcia in Barcelona. The two detainees were moved on a pre-trial basis to Shikma Prison in Ashkelon, legally assisted by Adalah and accused of collaborating with Hamas due to their links to the PCPE. Their detention was subsequently extended by a further six days.

On May 10, both Saif Abu Keshek and Thiago Ávila were released and deported from Israel. The Spanish Foreign Minister, José Manuel Albares, confirmed the release of the Spanish activist and stated that he "is now flying freely back to Spain."
