= Soumoud Convoy =

2025 attempt by land to break the Gaza Strip blockade

- Part of the Global March to Gaza
- Date: June 9–16, 2025 (7 days)
- Location: Sirte, east Libya
- Caused by: Blockade of the Gaza Strip; Gaza humanitarian crisis; Gaza genocide
- Goals: Breaking the Israeli blockade; delivering humanitarian aid to the Gaza Strip; ending genocide in Gaza
- Result: Convoy cancelled, 16 June

Parties
Tunisian Coordination of Joint Action for Palestine: Tunisian civil society groups; Dignity Convoy	(Libya) Libyan National Army: Supreme Commander Khalifa Haftar; Arab Republic of Egypt: Egyptian Foreign Ministry

Casualties
- Arrested: 13–15 (Note: Media confirmed 13, organisers announced 15.)

The Soumoud Convoy (Note: Alternatively spelt Somoud Convoy or Sumud Convoy.) (Arabic: قافلة الصمود, romanized: Qāfilat aṣ‑Ṣumūd), variously translated as Steadfast Convoy (Note: Also Caravan of Steadfastness, Steadfastness Convoy, and Convoy of Steadfastness.) or Maghreb Resilience Convoy, (Note: Also Maghreb Resistance Convoy, and shortened to Resilience Convoy.) was a humanitarian land convoy travelling from Tunisia, through Libya, towards the Rafah border crossing between Palestine and Egypt. It began on June 9, 2025 to raise awareness of the humanitarian crisis in Gaza. The goal was to try and break the Israeli blockade, deliver humanitarian aid to the Palestinians living in the Gaza Strip, and end of the genocide in Gaza. The convoy was the North African contingent contributing to the Global March to Gaza, which intended to begin from Egypt, but was cancelled on 16 June, the same day the convoy's journey to Rafah was cancelled.

The North African convoy set off from Tunis on 9 June, with approximately 1,000–1,500 people taking part, mostly from Tunisia, and also from Algeria, Libya, Mauritania, and Morocco. It crossed the Tunisia–Libya border, arrived in Tripoli, Libya, on 11 June, and was supported by Libya's Prime Minister and Foreign Minister. Two days later, the protest was halted at the Libyan city of Sirte heading east, and subsequently blocked by Libyan National Army commander Khalifa Haftar's forces. On 15 June, the convoy retreated to the region of Misrata in west Libya after over a dozen participants had been arrested whom organisers demanded the release of. The Egyptian Foreign Ministry stated that it would not permit the convoy to reach to Rafah, citing the need for permits; a position supported by authorities in eastern Libya. The convoy later renamed to Maghreb Sumud Flotilla, in co-ordination with the Global Sumud Flotilla, involving over 50 vessels.

== Background ==
On the 3 April 2024, several Tunisian civil organizations announced that a humanitarian medical caravan would depart from Tunisia to the Gaza Strip by land after Eid al-Fitr, carrying dozens of doctors, nurses, and medical equipment. However, the plan was not implemented.

On 8 June 2025, the project announced the continuation of its plans and invited all previously registered participants in the project to participate in a training session focused on first aid, legal protocols relevant to the convoy, and the fundamentals of non-violent resistance.

== Timeline ==
=== June 9–11: Tunis to Zawiya and Tripoli ===
On 9 June, after the Algerian participants arrived from Algiers, the entire convoy set out from Tunis to start its journey towards Gaza. On 10 June, the convoy crossed into Libya through the Libyan-Tunisian border crossing. The following day, the convoy reached Tripoli after having left the city of Zawiya, with the intention to cross the border to Libya and Egypt into Sallum, in order to reach Rafah on the 15th, alongside the Global March to Gaza intended to arrive on the same day. The convoy consists of around a dozen buses and hundred other vehicles, with the number of participants estimated to be more than 1,000 to 1,500 people, and as high as 7,000, according to The Jerusalem Post.

=== June 12–13: Sirte arrival and stall ===
As of 12 June and according to organisers, participants failed to gain permits of passage from both Egypt and Libya, France24 reported there is lack of clarity regarding crossing Eastern Libya, due to the territorial control by rival forces to the Libyan National Army leader Khalifa Haftar. Having arrived in Libya, figures reported the convoy at 1,500 participants and over 150 vehicles.

On June 13, it was reported that the convoy had halted at Sirte, having been stopped near the frontline between Western Libya and Eastern Libya by authorities of Eastern Libya. Benghazi-based government requested that activists "engage in proper coordination with the official Libyan authorities through legal and diplomatic channels". The Libyan Ministry of Interior denied the accusation by organisers that the convoy had been stopped by authorities. According to organisers, security officials stated that the delay was due to lack of permission granted from the city of Benghazi, later confirmed by a spokesperson, while authorities had given permission for participants to camp in Sirte as they wait for approval. Al Jazeera cited local sources and reported that "internal disputes among eastern Libya’s security and military factions are hindering the convoy’s progress".

=== June 14–15: Retreat after military blockade ===
On June 14, in a televised statement, organisers declared that they had been surrounded by military commander Khalifa Haftar's forces, with the convoy blocked by authorities loyal to the commander. In response, a spokesperson for the eastern Libyan government stated it was willing to provide supplies to the convoy, but that it would not be able to pass without authorization from Egypt. According to organisers, communications and internet were shut off at the Sirte camp, and four participants were initially arrested, accused of publishing "offensive videos".

On June 15, the convoy was subject to a "military blockade" near Sirte, with organisers describing a systematic, methodical siege. The convoy subsequently retreated to the Misrata region of western Libya. Organizers demanded the release of 13 participants who were arrested, including three bloggers, reasserting their aims to continue towards Rafah, to end "the genocide of the Palestinian people resisting in Gaza".

=== June 16: Cancellation of convoy journey ===
On June 16, organisers announced that they had cancelled the convoy's journey to Rafah, after being blocked by authorities in eastern Libya. According to Al Jazeera Arabic, coordinators stated that "eastern Libyan forces insisted on preventing the convoy from crossing into Sirte", citing lack of permission to cross Libya to reach Egypt. According to organisers, 15 participants had been detained in total, including 11 Libyans.

== Organisers and participants ==
The convoy is organised by the Tunisian Coordination of Joint Action for Palestine and Tunisian civil society groups, intended to challenge and breach the blockade of the Gaza strip as "symbolic act". It is independent from the Gaza Freedom Flotilla intercepted earlier in the month and includes "activists, lawyers and medical professionals from North Africa", according to AP News. Organisers have stated their aim is for "the immediate lifting of the unjust siege on the strip".

Notable participants of the convoy include Sheikh Yahya Sari, a member of the Algerian Association of Muslim Scholars, and several Algerian parliamentarians who have also participated in the convoy.

After the July convoy the group renamed to become the Maghreb Sumud Flotilla, in co-ordination with the Global March to Gaza and the Freedom Flotilla Coalition, and established the Global Sumud Flotilla, with more than 50 ships and participants from over 40 countries.

=== Groups endorsing ===
Groups endorsing the convey include:

- Tunisian General Labour Union
- Tunisian Journalists Syndicate
- National Bar Association of Tunisia
- Tunisian League for the Defence of Human Rights
- Tunisian Forum for Economic and Social Rights
- Tunisian Medical Council
- Tunisian Organisation of Young Doctors

=== Dignity Convoy ===
On June 14, 2025, another humanitarian convoy, the Dignity Convoy, left northern Lebanon, consisting of citizens, activists, and Palestinian refugees. The initiative coincides with the Soumoud Convoy, as part of the wider Arab movement's attempt to break the siege of Gaza. Its continued progress was recognised as being dependent on being allowed to cross Egypt to reach Rafah.

== Responses ==
=== Algeria ===
The Movement of Society for Peace, Algeria’s largest Islamic political party, issued a strong statement of support for the caravan, celebrating its role in the global surge of popular activism for Gaza and against Israeli aggression.

=== Egypt ===
On 12 June, the Egyptian Foreign Ministry stated that it would not permit the convoy to march to Rafah, citing the requirements for permits.

=== Libya ===
Upon arriving in Tripoli, Libya's Prime Minister Abdulhamid Dbeibah described the convoy as a "fraternal humanitarian initiative", embraced by Libyans, and the Libyan Foreign Minister also expressed full support for the convoy. Politician Khaled al-Mishri called on all parties to facilitate the convoy's passage, expressing his astonishment at attempts to obstruct the convoy, and describing it as having noble motives.

In Eastern Libya, the Benghazi-based government requested activists "engage in proper coordination with the official Libyan authorities", otherwise recommending the activists return home, citing Egypt's official statements regarding lack of authorization.

=== Morocco ===
Quds News Network reported that Moroccan police at Mohammed V International Airport, in the city of Casablanca, condemned the deportations and detentions of Moroccan travelers, who had complained of their treatment by Egyptian authorities.

=== Netherlands ===
The Amsterdam branch of the SJP organization reported that it will be joining the march and has opened a fundraiser to fund money to book tickets to fly to Cairo.

== Analysis ==
The Arab Weekly described the situation as "politically sensitive" and the position of Egyptian authorities as a "tough predicament", with the worst case scenario involving participants attempting to breach the Rafah border, as this would create the pretext for a violent crackdown from Israel, according to the newspaper. An Egyptian national security expert and retired Major General stated that Cairo is experiencing "an unenviable situation", regarding whether to allow the convoy to proceed. The veteran believes that the number of protesters would increase dramatically with participants reaching Egypt.

== See also ==
- Global Sumud Flotilla – 2025 attempt to break Israeli blockade of the Gaza Strip
- July 2025 Gaza Freedom Flotilla – Set sail on 13 July 2025, intercepted by Israel
- June 2025 Gaza Freedom Flotilla – Set sail on 1st June 2025, intercepted by Israel
- May 2025 drone attack on Gaza Freedom Flotilla – 2025 suspected drone attack on humanitarian vessel
