= Luis Dávila =

Luis Dávila may refer to:

- Luis Dávila Colón, Puerto Rican political activist
- Luis Dávila (actor) (1927–1998), Argentine actor
- Luis Davila (boxer) (born 1954), Puerto Rican boxer
- Luis Alfonso Dávila (born 1943), Venezuelan politician
- Luis Yordán Dávila (1869–1932), Puerto Rican mayor of Ponce
