= Thiago Ávila =

Brazilian activist (born 1986)

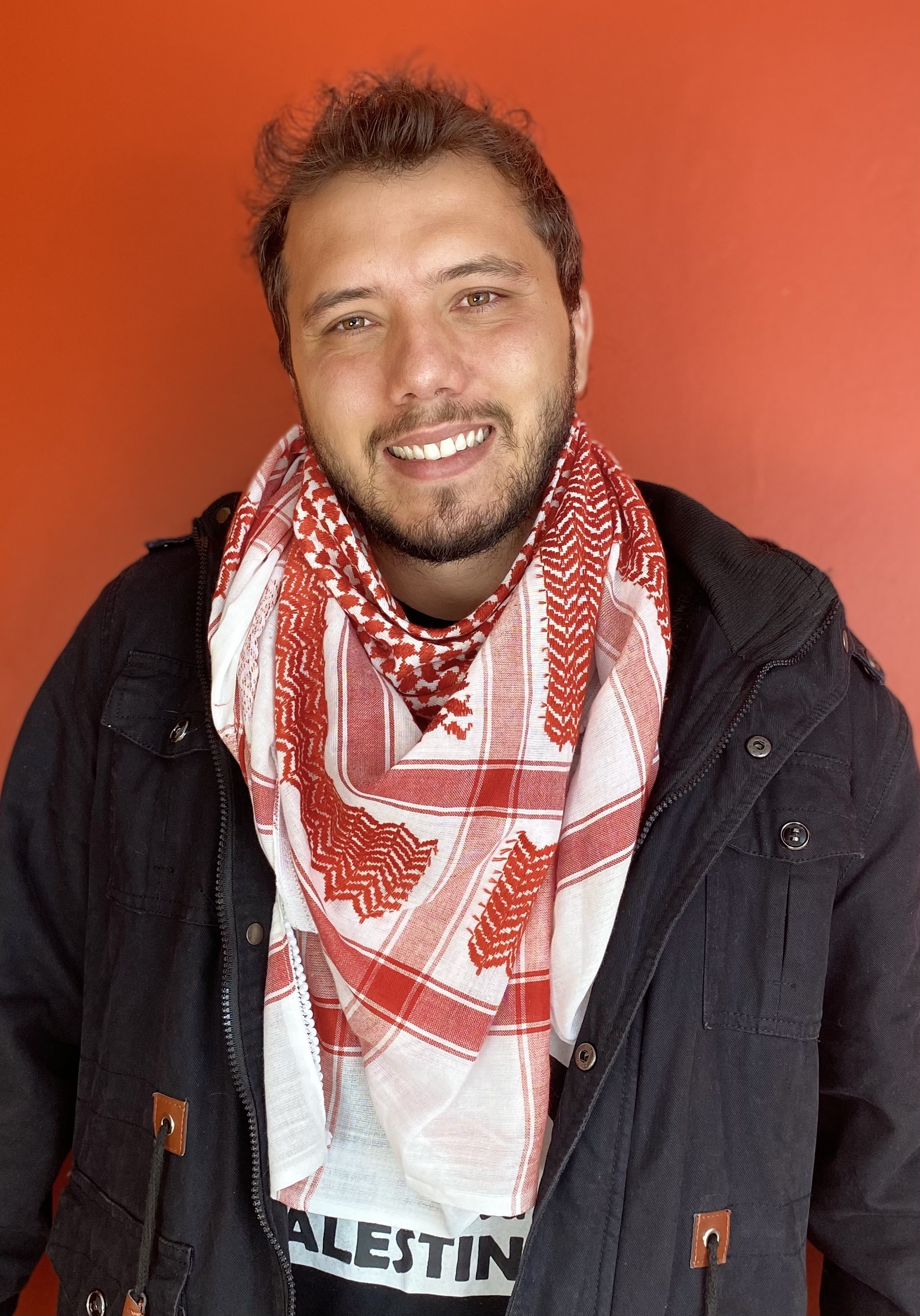
- Ávila in 2021, wearing a Palestinian keffiyeh
- Born: Thiago de Ávila e Silva Oliveira; 26 August 1986 (age 40); Brasília, Federal District, Brazil
- Occupations: Political activist; humanitarian activist; climate activist; communication scholar
- Years active: 2006–present
- Known for: Gaza humanitarian missions
- Political party: PSOL REDE
- Spouse: Lara Souza
- Children: 1

Thiago de Ávila e Silva Oliveira (Brazilian Portuguese: [tʃiˈaɡu dʒi ˈavilɐ i ˈsiwvɐ oliˈvejɾɐ]; born 26 August 1986) is a Brazilian political and humanitarian activist. He gained international recognition as one of the participants aboard the June 2025 Gaza Freedom Flotilla and the April 2026 Global Sumud Flotilla – both humanitarian aid missions to the Gaza Strip, a Palestinian territory under Israeli blockade and bombardment.

== Activism ==
=== In Brazil ===
In 2022, Ávila ran for federal deputy of the state of São Paulo for the Socialism and Liberty Party–Sustainability Network coalition (PSOL REDE Federation). In late June 2026, he launched his candidacy with the same parties for the same position, running on an environmentalist and anti-war platform.

=== Iran, Lebanon and Palestine ===
In June 2024, Ávila participated in the "International Summit on Gaza" in Tehran, Iran, an event attended by local authorities such as Iranian parliament speaker Mohammad Bagher Ghalibaf. Ávila's work earned him recognition from the Embassy of Iran in Brasília, which highlighted his "communication work and solidarity with the Palestinian people".

Ávila attended the funeral of Hassan Nasrallah, the leader of Hezbollah who was assassinated in an Israeli airstrike in Lebanon in 2024. Ávila was invited by Hezbollah as one of approximately 100 social media influencers aligned with the group to attend the funeral and cover the event. He was photographed at the mausoleum erected in Nasrallah's honor near the Camille Chamoun Sports City in Beirut. During the visit, Ávila posted extensively on social media praising Nasrallah as an "inspiring" figure in the history of anti-colonial and anti-imperialist struggles, as well as a "martyr". In Instagram captions and videos, he stated that he had met Nasrallah at age 19 during the 2006 Lebanon War and was inspired by a speech in which Nasrallah declared that the Lebanese resistance would defeat the "Zionist entity". Ávila was also filmed at a meeting in Beirut participating in chants of "Death to Israel", "Death to America", and "Victory for Islam" while pumping his fist in the air.

Ávila has publicly stated that he "despise[s] Israel and the United States." He additionally shared a photograph of himself with Leila Khaled, a member of the Popular Front for the Liberation of Palestine (PFLP), known for her role in multiple civilian plane hijackings in the 1970s, describing her as "one of the [people] I most admire in the whole world." Ávila's alignment has been seen by some as controversial due to Hezbollah's and the PFLP's designation as terrorist organizations in a number of countries. Because of this, he was denied entry in Argentina in late March 2026 over generic "terrorism" charges.

==== Gaza flotillas ====
In June 2025, Ávila was part of the crew of the Madleen – a vessel that departed from Catania, Italy, carrying medical supplies, food, and hygiene items to Gaza. The initiative, organized by pro-Palestinian coalitions, aimed to symbolically break the reinforced Israeli blockade amid the Gaza genocide and denounce the "collective punishment" against Palestinians. Among the participants were Swedish climate activist Greta Thunberg and French-Palestinian MEP Rima Hassan.

The vessel was intercepted by the Israeli navy in international waters of the Mediterranean Sea and towed to the port of Ashdod. The incident has been described by organizers as a "kidnapping by Israeli forces"; Israel claimed the action was justified to prevent a breach of its naval blockade, which, however, is considered unlawful according to international law. Ávila and the other crew members were detained for deportation. On 10 June 2025, the Brazilian Ministry of Foreign Affairs (Itamaraty) confirmed that Ávila was being held in an Israeli detention center after refusing to sign deportation documents. Brazilian diplomats provided consular assistance, and the Brazilian government formally requested Ávila's release, reiterating its opposition to the Israeli blockade on Gaza and emphasizing the urgency of the humanitarian crisis in the region. Between 11 and 12 June 2025, he was held in solitary confinement in Ayalon Prison after going on a dry hunger strike. He was released that day and deported to Brazil. In an official statement, the National Council for Human Rights (CNDH), which is linked to the Ministry of Human Rights and Citizenship, classified the case as a kidnapping and a war crime.

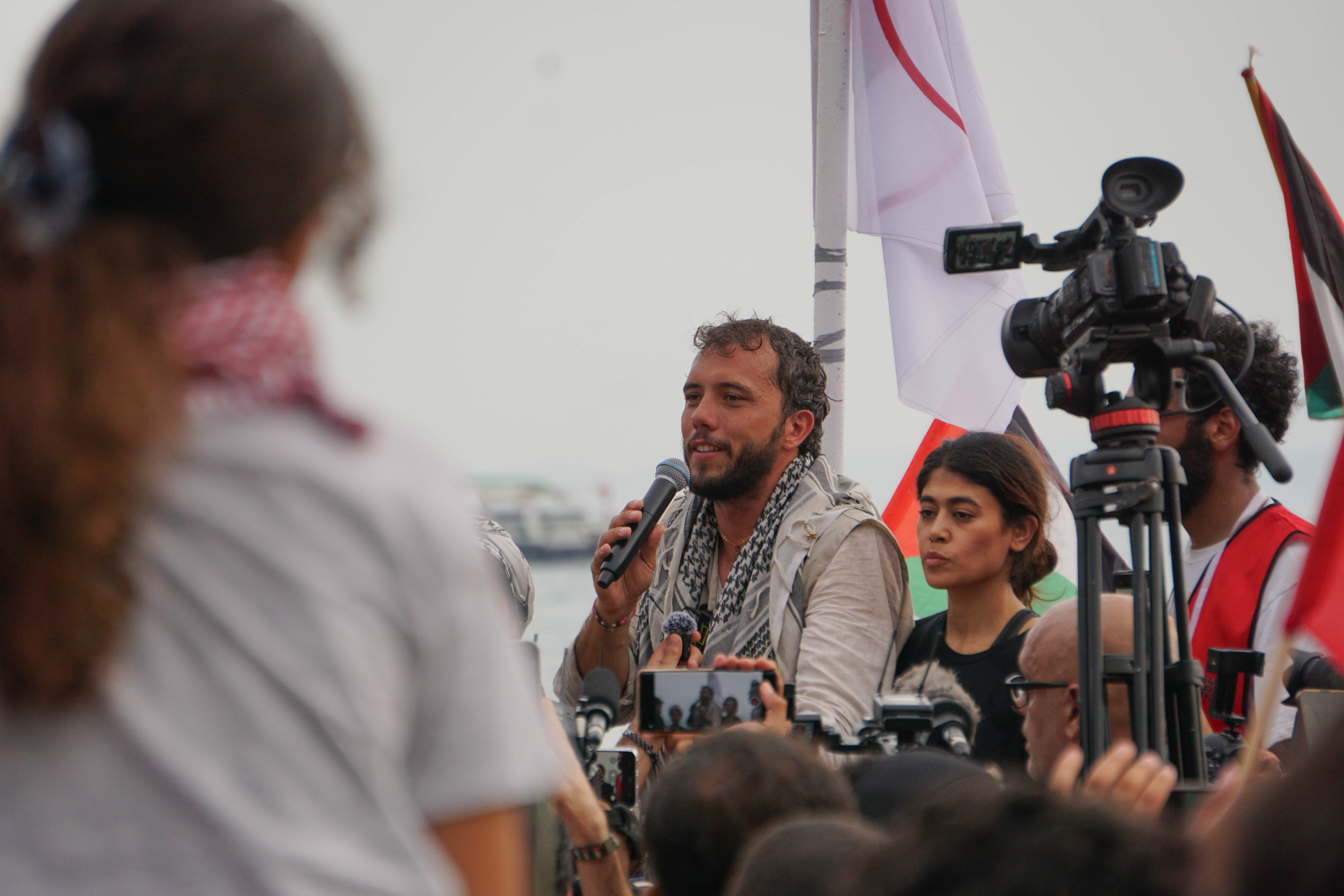
Ávila and Rima Hassan at the launch of the Global Sumud Flotilla in Sidi Bou Said, Tunisia

Following the Israeli capture of the July 2025 Gaza Freedom Flotilla, Ávila joined the Global Sumud Flotilla (GSF) and set sail between August and September 2025. He was part of the steering committee alongside Thunberg and several other activists. After the GSF's boarding by Israel in early October, he was again arrested and went on a hunger strike alongside other activists. He was expelled shortly after, landing in São Paulo on 9 October.

Between 28 and 29 April 2026, yet another Gaza-bound flotilla was intercepted and boarded by Israel in international waters near Crete, Greece. While over 270 activists were almost immediately released, Ávila and Saif Abu Keshek were detained until 10 May. Ávila and his legal team, Adalah, testified of him being "held in total isolation under punitive conditions despite the purely civilian nature of their mission," and characterized the detention as illegal even by Israel's own laws. The two went on a hunger strike for several days before being freed.

=== Online presence ===
With over 1 million followers on Instagram, Ávila uses the platform to document humanitarian efforts and promote content related to Palestine and other countries, including Cuba and Lebanon.

== Other ventures ==
In 2009, Thiago Ávila founded Globalvisa, a company specialized in visas, passports, translations and diplomatic assistance. He left the business in 2020.

== Personal life ==
Ávila was born in 1986 in the federal capital, Brasília. He has a sister, Luana. He is married to Lara Souza, with whom he has a daughter, Teresa (born 2024), named after his mother Teresa Regina "Têca" de Ávila e Silva. The latter, who suffered from complications from three strokes she had in 2006, passed away on 5 May 2026, while her son was in Israeli detention; Israeli authorities refused to release him immediately, preventing him from attending her funeral. His father, Ivo de Araújo Oliveira, has been involved with his son's humanitarian activities.
