= Ramón Luis Rivera =

Puerto Rican politician (1929–2026)

Mayor of Bayamón, Puerto Rico
- In office 1977–2001
- Preceded by: Manuel Aponte Borrero
- Succeeded by: Ramón Luis Rivera Jr.

Member of the Puerto Rico House of Representatives from the 6th District
- In office 1973–1977
- Preceded by: Benjamín Ortiz
- Succeeded by: Luis Gonzalo De Jesús

Member of the Municipal Assembly of Bayamón, Puerto Rico
- In office 1969–1973

Chair of the Puerto Rico New Progressive Party
- In office 1988–1989
- Preceded by: Baltasar Corrada del Río
- Succeeded by: Carlos Romero Barceló

Personal details
- Born: June 21, 1929 Aguas Buenas, Puerto Rico
- Died: September 30, 2026 (aged 97) Bayamón, Puerto Rico
- Party: New Progressive Party (PNP)
- Spouse: Angélica Cruz Baez
- Children: Ramón Luis
- Education: Metropolitan School of Commerce (AS)
- Profession: Politician

Military service
- Allegiance: United States of America
- Branch/service: United States Army
- Years of service: 1952–1954
- Rank: Specialist 2nd Class

Ramón Luis Rivera Rivera (June 21, 1929 – September 30, 2026) was a Puerto Rican politician affiliated with the New Progressive Party. He served as Mayor of Bayamón from 1977 until 2001.

== Early life ==
Rivera was born in Aguas Buenas. Rivera began his primary studies in his hometown of Aguas Buenas, but completed high school at the Dr. Agustín Stahl High School in Bayamón. He then completed an Associate degree in Administration from the Metropolitan School of Commerce. Rivera served in the United States Army. From 1952 to 1954, he served during the Korean War era. He was stationed in Germany until being honorably discharged. Rivera worked for 15 years for Merrill Lynch, Pierce, Fenner & Smith.

== Political career ==
Rivera began his political career in 1968, when he was elected as member of the Municipal Assembly of Bayamón. In 1972, Rivera was elected to the House of Representatives of Puerto Rico representing District 6.

After one term as Representative, Rivera ran for Mayor at the 1976 general election. He defeated incumbent Manuel Aponte Borrero. His main concerns towards Bayamón were in the tourism and business industries. During his 24-year tenure, many buildings and other types of structures were inaugurated, including the Parque De Las Ciencias, the Parque del Trensito (which had, at the time it opened, Puerto Rico's only running train and a DC-3 plane formerly used by United Airlines), the city hall, which is a building that crosses over an avenue, the Ruben Rodriguez Coliseum, the Canton Mall, a small, pedestrian suspension bridge at Lomas Verdes neighborhood and many others. In addition, a large industrial park with such notable companies as 7 Up and Wrangler also opened, in the area known as Lomas Verdes. 7UP has a bottling facility there.

He was a member of the New Progressive Party (PNP). Rivera was the president of the New Progressive Party from 1988 until 1989. In 2000, he announced he would not run for mayor again, and his son, Ramón Luis Rivera Jr. was then elected as mayor. Rivera Jr. has held that position ever since. Rivera Sr. thereafter retired from public life.

Rivera died at his home on September 30, 2026, at the age of 97. He was buried at the Braulio Dueño Colón Cemetery in Bayamón, Puerto Rico.

== See also ==
- List of Puerto Ricans
- Bayamón, Puerto Rico
- Politics of Puerto Rico

House of Representatives of Puerto Rico
Preceded by Benjamín Ortiz	Member of the Puerto Rico House of Representatives from the 6th District; 1973–1977	Succeeded by Luis Gonzalo De Jesús
Political offices
Preceded by Manuel Aponte Borrero	Mayor of Bayamón, Puerto Rico; 1977–2001	Succeeded by Ramón Luis Rivera Jr.
Party political offices
Preceded by Baltasar Corrada del Río	Chair of the Puerto Rico New Progressive Party; 1988–1989	Succeeded by Carlos Romero Barceló
