= Virgilio Dávila =

Puerto Rican mayor and poet

- Born: Virgilio Dávila Cabrera; January 28, 1869; Toa Baja, Puerto Rico
- Died: August 22, 1943 (aged 74); Bayamón, Puerto Rico
- Occupations: poet, educator, politician, businessman
- Children: José Antonio Dávila
- Writing career
- Notable works: "Patria"; "Viviendo y Amando"; "Aromas del Terruño"; "No des tu Tierra al Extraño"
- Literary movement: Modernismo

Virgilio Dávila Cabrera (January 28, 1869 – August 22, 1943), was a Puerto Rican poet from the modern literary era, educator, politician and businessman.

== Early years ==
Dávila was born in the town of Toa Baja. he was influenced by the literary collection of his parents, both of whom were teachers, at an early age. He attended private schools where he received both his primary and secondary education. Dávila earned his bachelor's degree from the Civil Institute of Higher Learning in 1895. He taught school in the town of Gurabo.

== Career ==
Dávila and his wife had a son on October 7, 1898, José Antonio Dávila, in the City of Bayamón, who would one day take after his father and become a poet himself. His experiences as a teacher and in agriculture later reflected in his poetry. In 1903, Dávila published his first book of poems "Patria". In this book he included poems which he wrote about Jose de Diego, Federico Degetau and Lola Rodríguez de Tió. He also included poems about the island and love in general. In 1904, Dávila became director of the weekly publication "Chantelier", which he co-founded with Braulio Dueño Colón.

In 1905, Dávila ran for Mayor of the Municipality of Bayamon. He won the election and served as the municipality's mayor from 1905 to 1910.

Together with Dueño Colon and Manuel Fernandez Juncos, he prepared a book of school songs. Dávila wrote many poems that were published in many publications and newspapers of the day. He also wrote a book for his grandchildren, titled A Book for my Grandchildren in 1928. Dávila's style, considered traditional, was greatly influenced by Victor Hugo.

== Written works ==
Among his better known poems are:

- "Patria" (1903)
- "Viviendo y Amando" (1912)
- "Aromas del Terruño" (1916)
- "Nostalgia"
- "No des tu Tierra al Extraño".

The following is a short version of "No des tu Tierra al Extraño" ("Do not give your land to a stranger!"):

Spanish (original version)	English translation
¡No des tu tierra al extraño! por más que te pague bien.. el que su terruño vende! vende la Patria con él.	Do not give your land to a stranger! even though he pays you well.. He who sells his land! Is selling his homeland as well.

== Later years ==
Dávila died in the City of Bayamón on August 22, 1943. He is buried in that city's Porta Coeli Cemetery. A public housing complex, a school, and an avenue in Bayamón bear the name of Dávila in his honor.

== See also ==
- Puerto Rican Poetry
- List of Puerto Rican writers
- List of Puerto Ricans
- Puerto Rican literature
- List of mayors of Bayamón, Puerto Rico
