= Sumud =

Palestinian cultural value akin to stoicism

Ṣumūd (Arabic: صمود, romanized: ṣumūd, meaning "steadfastness" or "steadfast perseverance"; derived from the verb صمد ṣamada, meaning "to defy, brave, withstand") is a Palestinian cultural value, ideological theme and political strategy that emerged in the wake of the 1967 Arab–Israeli War among the Palestinian people as a consequence of their oppression and the resistance it inspired. People who exhibit ṣumūd are referred to as ṣāmidīn (صامدين), the singular forms of which are ṣāmid (صامد, m.) and ṣāmida (صامدة, f.).

As the term developed, Palestinians have distinguished between two main forms of sumud. The first, "static sumud", is more passive and is defined by Ibrahim Dhahak as the "maintenance of Palestinians on their land." The second, "resistance sumud" (Arabic: صمود مقاوم, romanized: ṣumūd muqāwim), is a more dynamic ideology whose aim is to seek ways of building alternative institutions so as to resist and undermine the Israeli occupation of Palestine.

The ultimate symbol associated with the concept of sumud and the Palestinian sense of rootedness in the land is the olive tree, ubiquitous throughout Palestine. Another icon of sumud that has often been portrayed in Palestinian artwork is that of the mother, and more specifically, a peasant woman depicted as pregnant.

== Origins and development ==
In the West Bank and Gaza Strip, sumud represented the Palestinian political strategy as adopted from 1967 onward. As a concept closely related to the land, agriculture and indigenousness, the ideal image of the Palestinian put forward at this time was that of the peasant (in Arabic, fellah) who stayed put on his land, refusing to leave. Baruch Kimmerling writes that the adoption of a strategy of sumud was motivated by a desire to avoid a second ethnic cleansing. Sumud as a strategy is more passive than the strategy adopted by the Palestinian fedayeen, though it has provided an important subtext to the narrative of the fighters, "in symbolising continuity and connections with the land, with peasantry and a rural way of life."

=== Static sumud ===
In the 1970s, as the shift away from the underground militant activities of the Palestinian fedayeen fully gave way to the notion of sumud among Palestinians still living in what was once historic Palestine, the mother emerged as a representation of the sumud ideology. The heritage and folklore movement also thrived at this time, and the poster art produced made the image of visibly pregnant peasant women an icon of sumud.

In the late 1970s, sumud called for "a collective third way between submission and exile, between passivity and ... violence to end the occupation." Static sumud, though underscored by the determination to stay on one's land, was also characterized by an attitude of resignation. The objective of simply remaining in place manifested itself in a reliance on international aid such as that received from The Steadfastness Aid Fund of the Jordanian-Palestinian Joint Committee, established by the Arab Summit Conference in Baghdad in 1978.

=== Resistance sumud ===
The emergence of medical relief committees in the early 1980s, made up of doctors from hospitals in Jerusalem who would spend their days off volunteering to establish and operate clinics in Palestinian villages, was the first widespread manifestation of resistance sumud. By 1983, eight such committees were providing medical services throughout the West Bank. Uniting to form the Union of Palestinian Medical Relief Committees, this grassroots organization provided a model for other such committees which emerged in the years and decades to follow.

In the mid-1980s Yasser Arafat, describing how sumud is a political strategy that is prerequisite to fighting, said,

"The most important element in the Palestinian program is holding onto the land. Holding onto the land and not warfare alone. Warfare comes at a different level. If you only fight — that is a tragedy. If you fight and emigrate — that is a tragedy. The basis is that you hold on and fight. The important thing is that you hold onto the land and afterward — combat."

Sumud in this sense has meant "staying put despite continuous assault." It is not merely about passive endurance, but "an act of unyielding resistance and defiance." Palestinian refugees, both those living within and outside of the occupied territories, often describe their ability to both resist and endure camp life as sumud. The holding out of Palestinian refugees against the assaults on Tel al-Zaatar and Sabra and Shatila in Lebanon are cited as prime examples of sumud.

Noam Chomsky, in his book The Fateful Triangle, quotes Raja Shehadeh who says that there are three ways to resist occupation: "blind hatred" ("the terrorist"), "mute submission" ("the moderate"), and the way of "the Samid". He quotes Shehadeh as saying "You, Samid, choose to stay in that prison, because it is your home, and because you fear that if you leave, your jailer will not allow you to return. Living like this, you must constantly resist the twin temptations of either acquiescing in the jailer's plan in numb despair, or becoming crazed by consuming hatred for your jailer and yourself, the prisoner."

At the conclusion of the 2021 Israel-Palestine crisis, a woman doctor in Gaza told Israeli journalist Amira Hass:

Now we're back home. I was so happy to return to the garden and our doves. They didn't die, although we hadn't fed them for four days. Like us, they also know the meaning of sumud (steadfastness)... Generation after generation, the Nakba (catastrophe of 1948) continues. Wherever we go, the Jews persecute us. But they won't eliminate us, that's impossible. They must understand that. We aren't (American) Indians. We'll stay and we will multiply. Nor will we forget... We don't believe in parties, in Hamas or Fatah. They can go to hell. But we have faith in God, in our people, in our land, in our homeland.

=== Non-violent civil disobedience ===
Since 1967, nonviolent protests mounted by Palestinians, such as general strikes, boycotts and demonstrations, have been intimately associated with the concept of sumud. Raja Shehadeh's conceptualization of sumud, as a non-violent attitude of life that could forge a third way between acceptance of the occupation and opting for violent struggle, gave a voice to those many Palestinians who refused to leave their land and tried to go on with their daily lives. While simply carrying on with daily life under often impossible circumstances can in itself be considered a form of non-violent resistance, more active forms of non-violent civil disobedience have also been inspired and informed by the concept of sumud. In recent years, as a response to a spike of Israeli demolitions around At-Tuwani and neighbouring villages in the South Hebron Hills, a Youth for Sumud group has formed, whose aim is to organize protests at the occupation and inspire locals to stay on their land in the face of persistent military and settler harassment.

==== First Intifada ====
During the First Intifada (1987–1993) the concept of resistance sumud gained full expression in the focus on "freeing Palestinians from dependence on Israel by refusing to cooperate and by building independent institutions and committees."

A comprehensive nonviolence action plan, announced by Hanna Siniora and Mubarak Awad in January 1988, called upon Palestinians to boycott Israeli products and end cooperation with Israel. Merchants in the Gaza Strip and West Bank shut down their shops in protest over Israel's treatment of demonstrators. Palestinian women began to cultivate crops on previously uncultivated land so as to supplant the need for Israeli produce, and underground, makeshift schools were opened by Palestinians to respond to Israel's closure of 900 educational establishments in the occupied territories.

In September–October 1989, as Israel tried to quell the Intifada, tax raids were implemented, whereby Israeli military forces and tax officials would enter a town, levying heavy taxes against Palestinian individuals and businesses, and walking out with millions of dollars in savings, goods and household items. In Beit Sahour, villagers responded by mounting a tax revolt under the slogan, "No taxation without representation." The refusal to pay taxes was met with the imposition of a total Israeli siege on the village, preventing the entry of food and medical supplies, withholding electricity supplies and imposing strict curfews. Personal belongings, furniture, factory machinery and cars were confiscated by the army and many residents of Beit Sahour were also beaten and arrested. The villagers nevertheless persisted until Israel called off the siege and the raids at the end of October 1989, due to media exposure and the ensuing international outcry.

== Symbols, icons, literary references ==
Olive picking in Ottoman Palestine

A large olive tree in Hebron

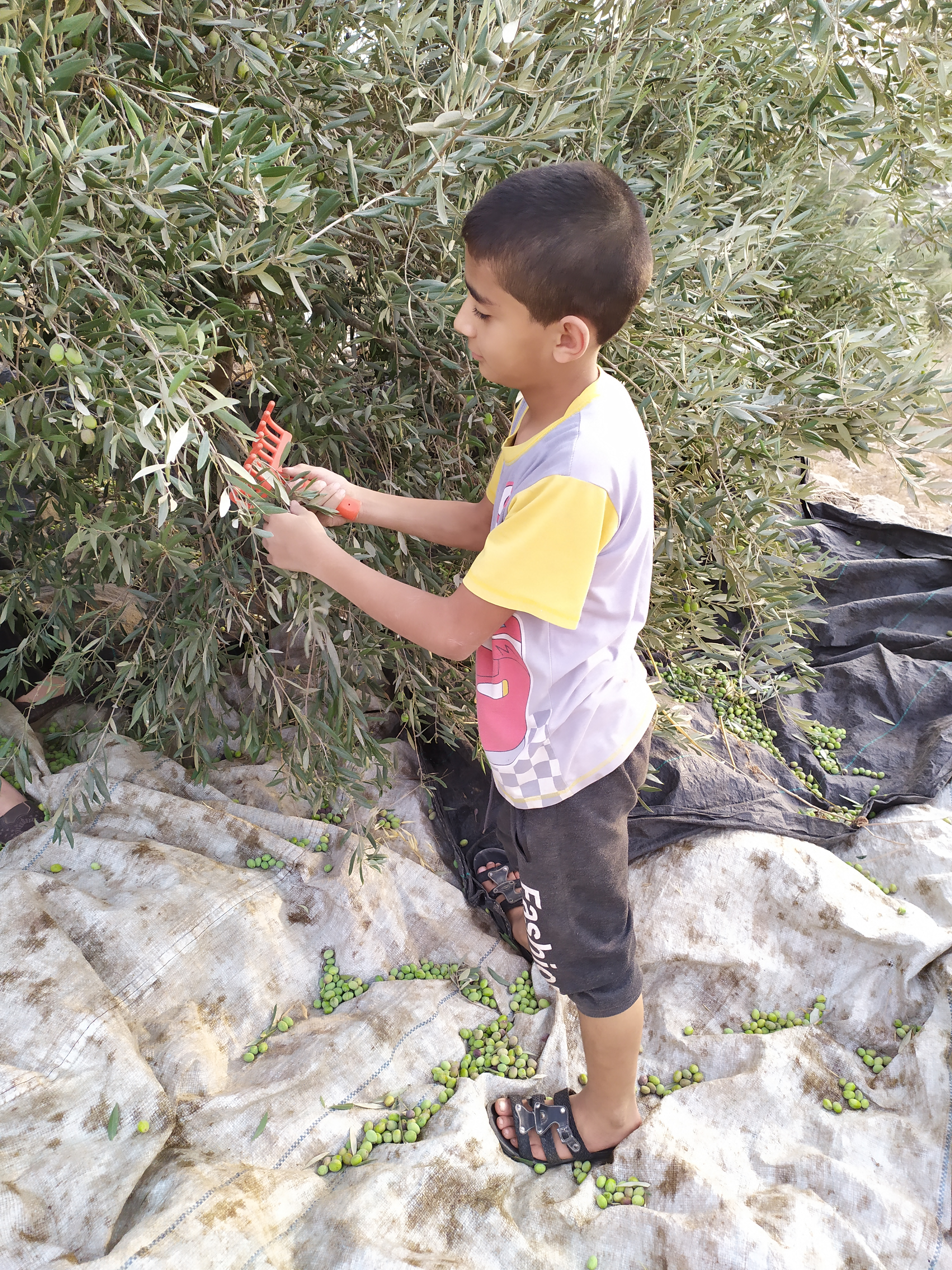
A child harvesting olives near As Simiya, West Bank, 2020

In addition to the peasant, and the pregnant peasant woman in particular, the olive tree and its long history of rootedness in the region is a primary symbol of sumud for Palestinians. This association manifested itself in Palestinian poetry, such as in Raja Shehadeh's 1982 poem which reads:

"Sometimes, when I am walking in the hills ... unselfconsciously enjoying the touch of the hard land under my feet, the smell of thyme and the hills and trees around me, I find myself looking at an olive tree, and as I am looking at it, it transforms itself before my eyes into a symbol of the samidin, of our struggle, of loss. And at that very moment I am robbed of the tree; instead there is a hollow space into which anger and pain flow."

Shehadeh, a West Bank lawyer, did not confine his references to sumud to poetry. In his book The Third Way (1982), he wrote, "We samidin cannot fight the Israelis' brute physical force but we must keep the anger burning — steel our wills to fight the lies. It is up to us to remember and record." Adriana Kemp notes of his representation of the samid that it is a situation of ambivalence, citing Shaehadeh's note on his voluntary return to the West Bank after being in Europe where he could have stayed, wherein he writes, "It is strange coming back like this, of your own free will, to the chains of sumud." Shehadeh also harshly critiqued the Palestinian elite who benefitted from paying "only widely patriotic lip-service to our struggle, [which] was more than my sumud in my poor and beloved land could stomach." Ironically, many Palestinians viewed people like Shehadeh, from a notable middle-class family in the West Bank, as forming part of the strata which benefitted most from the policies of financial support for the Palestine Liberation Organization (PLO) in the 1980s and accused them of promoting maintenance of the status quo through the policy of sumud.

Edward Said found encouragement in the increased self-consciousness and determination to stay in historic Palestine that had gained prominence among Palestinians in the occupied territories. In After the Last Sky: Palestinian Lives (1986), he references Shehadeh's work and characterizes sumud as "an entirely successful tactical solution" at a time when no efficacious strategy is available.

In My Enemy, Myself (1989), Yoram Binur, an Israeli journalist and committed Zionist who lived undercover as an Arab labourer for six months in Tel Aviv and Jerusalem in order to experience what such a life might be like, describes sumud as "an attitude, a philosophy, and a way of life." It is "[...] a more basic form of resistance growing out of the idea that merely to exist, to survive and to remain on one's land is an act of defiance — especially when deportation is the one thing that Palestinians fear most."

In describing more active forms of sumud, Binur tells of his encounter with two Arabs who were employed as construction workers at the Israeli settlement of Beit El. In response to Binur's admonishment (in his role as an Arab) for working for the "worst of them", the workers replied that not only does the money they receive for such work allow them to be samidin by living where they are, but that in their work they take advantage of every opportunity to "fight them". Binur asks, "What can you do as a simple labourer?" To which one of the workers replies:

"Quite a bit. First of all, after I lay the tiles in the bathroom or kitchen of an Israeli settler, when the tiles are all in place and the cement has already dried, I take a hammer and break a few. When we finish installing sewage pipes, and the Jewish subcontractor has checked to see that everything is alright, then I stuff a sackful of cement into the pipe. As soon as the water runs through that pipe the cement gets hard as rock, and the sewage system becomes blocked."

Sliman Mansour, a Palestinian artist, has produced images that "gave visual form to the newly formulated ideology of Sumud", which Gannit Ankori describes as "a firm rootedness in the land, regardless of the hardships and humiliation caused by occupation." Among the examples of Mansour's work that are cited by Ankori are two oils on canvas, Olive-picking (1987) and Olive-picking Triptych (1989).

Muhannad 'Abd Al-Hamid, columnist for the Palestinian daily Al-Ayyam, wrote that resistance (مقاومة, muqawama) is the legitimate right of the Palestinian people, but that, in light of its steep cost and limited results, other means of struggle should be used. Al-Hamid argues that:

"Resistance is survival and steadfastness. It is planting trees, developing education, boycotting Israeli products, [launching] a popular uprising against the racist separation fence, building homes in [East] Jerusalem, reopening the institutions [there], struggling against all forms of corruption, boycotting companies that contribute to the Judaization of Jerusalem and also to the building of the settlements, and also boycotting companies that supply arms to the occupation army. There are a hundred more ways of resistance that will damage the occupation more than they will damage us, while preserving the legitimate right of resistance under conditions that will not harm the security and interests of the [Palestinian] people.

However, some other high-profile Fatah members, such as Husam Khader, declared: "Fatah has not changed its national identity, and it retains the option of resistance and armed struggle. But now, for the first time ... it is permitting the option of negotiations as one of the Palestinian people's strategic options and as a possible way of attaining its political goals."

== Contemporary references and applications ==
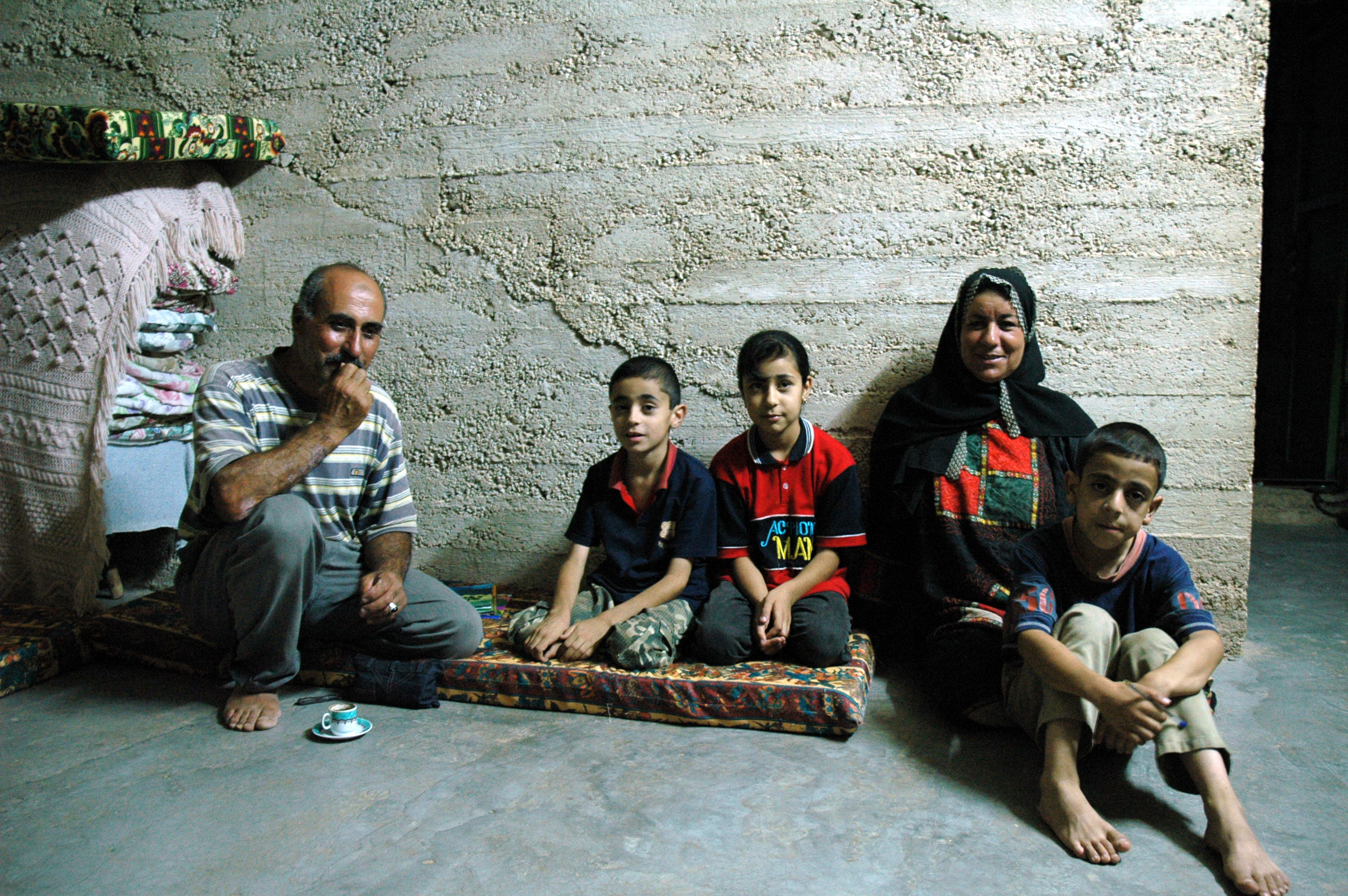
Palestinian family in Yanun, near Nablus 23 August 2004

A photography exhibition, The Spirit of Sumud, composed by James Prineas and supported by the Arab Educational Institute and the Artas Folklore Center in Bethlehem and Palestine-Family.net, defines sumud today as "the non-violent resistance of the Palestinians against land confiscation and ethnic cleansing. Like an old olive tree deeply rooted to the ground, those practicing sumud refuse to move away despite political, economic and physical injustices committed against them."

Michael Oliphant, a South African Ecumenical Accompanier based in Bethlehem as part of a program coordinated by the World Council of Churches (WCC), discusses the importance of sumud to Palestinian life in withstanding economic and political hardships. In a March 2007 report describing his experiences in the West Bank, he writes that sumud "describes the Palestinian spirit or geist. Regardless of the situation, Sumud kicks in and regulates the response to the threat or danger and humanity kicks in and lifts the communal spirit and makes coping possible — coping at all costs. This has the effect of presenting a deception that all is okay. More importantly it also engenders sharing widely amongst family members: better to have 20 families sharing 3000 shekels than 19 families going hungry." Oliphant also likened sumud to the traditional Southern African concept of ubuntu.

Toine van Teeffelen of the Arab Educational Institute in Bethlehem defines the sumud concept as, "on the one hand, [relating] to a vertical dimension, 'standing strong' on the land, having deep roots. On the other hand", sumud indicates "a horizontal time dimension – an attitude of patience and persistence, of not giving up", despite the odds. Motivated by the need to find sources of hope in the present Palestinian context, the Arab Educational Institute recently developed pedagogical applications of the sumud concept, taking it outside strictly political boundaries. The following values are stressed as constitutive of sumud: its democratic or participative character, openness to many different life stories, agency or willpower, an aesthetic perspective, and the possibility of connecting sumud with wider human values and circles of community.

Between August and September 2025, an international civilian effort to break the Israeli naval blockade of the Gaza Strip set sail, named Global Sumud Flotilla. One of its member organizations had previously attempted to break the siege through land via an initiative called Soumoud Convoy.

== See also ==
- Olive wood carving in Palestine
- Psychological resilience
- Sisu, a Finnish concept somewhat similar to sumud
- Stiff upper lip
- Thawabit, a set of fundamental national principles formulated by the PLO in 1977
- The Olive Harvest, a 2003 Palestinian film directed by Hanna Elias

== Bibliography ==
- Ankori, Gannit (2006). Palestinian Art. Reaktion Books. ISBN 1-86189-259-4.
- Abed, George T. (1988). The Palestinian Economy: Studies in Development Under Prolonged Occupation. Routledge. ISBN 0-415-00471-3.
- Jetter, Alexis; Orleck, Annelise; Taylor, Diana (1997). The Politics of Motherhood: Activist Voices from Left to Right. UPNE. ISBN 0-87451-780-X.
- Kemp, Adriana (2004). Israelis in Conflict: Hegemonies, Identities and Challenges. Sussex Academic Press. ISBN 1-903900-65-4.
- Kimmerling, Baruch (2003). Politicide: Ariel Sharon's war against the Palestinians. Verso. p. 23. ISBN 9781859845172. "ethnic cleansing ."
- Nassar, Jamal Raji; Heacock, Roger (1990). Intifada: Palestine at the Crossroads. Greenwood Publishing. ISBN 0-275-93411-X.
- Schulz, Helena Lindholm; Hammer, Juliane (2003). The Palestinian Diaspora: Formation of Identities and Politics of Homeland. Routledge. ISBN 0-415-26820-6.
