= Ramón Luis Rivera Jr. =

Puerto Rican mayor

Ramón Luis Rivera Cruz

Mayor of Bayamón, Puerto Rico
- Incumbent
- Assumed office January 1, 2001
- Preceded by: Ramón Luis Rivera

Member of the Senate of Puerto Rico for Bayamón district
- In office 1993–2000

Personal details
- Born: February 3, 1956 (age 70) Bayamón, Puerto Rico
- Party: New Progressive Party (PNP)
- Spouse: Narel Waleska Colón
- Education: University of Puerto Rico at Bayamón (BBA); Interamerican University of Puerto Rico
- Profession: Realtor

Ramón Luis Rivera Cruz (born February 3, 1956) is a Puerto Rican politician affiliated with the New Progressive Party. He is the current mayor of Bayamón, and succeeded his father, Ramón Luis Rivera, when the latter decided to retire after 23 years in office (1977–2000). Rivera served as a member of the Senate of Puerto Rico for the District of Bayamón from 1993 to 2000. He has been mayor of Bayamón since then.

== Early life ==
Ramón Luis Rivera Cruz was born on February 3, 1956. He is the first born of 5 siblings, son to Ramón Luis Rivera and Angélica Cruz. Ramón Luis Rivera Cruz attended Colegio Santo Domingo and Escuela Papa Juan XXIII for elementary and secondary school, respectively. Later he continued higher studies at University of Puerto Rico at Bayamón, where he gained a Bachelor of Business Administration and continued studies at Interamerican University of Puerto Rico. In 1994 Luis Rivera Jr. married Narel Waleska Colón and had two sons: Ramon Luis III and André Efraín.

== Political career ==
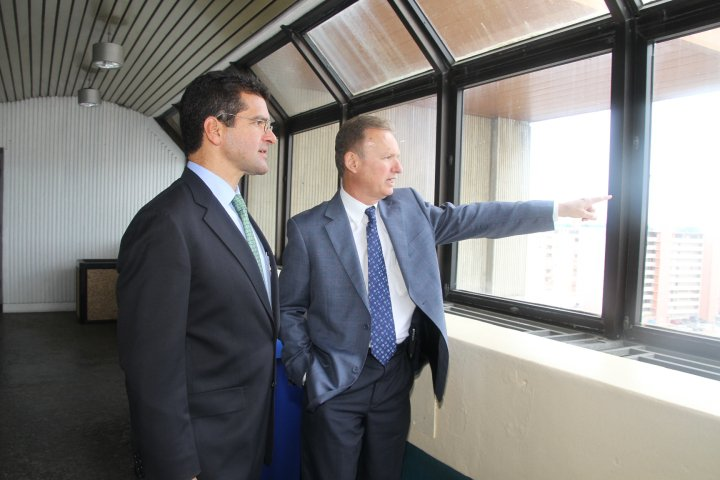
Ramón Luis Rivera (right) with Pedro Pierluisi (left)

In 1980, he started his political career as campaign manager for his father, Ramón Luis Rivera, the then-mayor of Bayamon seeking reelection. He was elected as a senator of the Bayamón district in 1992 and was reelected again in 1996.

During his time in the Senate, he was a chairman of different committees. Between them, Committee of Urbanism and Infrastructure, Committee on Ethics, Committee on Youth and the Committee of Recreation and Sports.

In 2000, he aspired for the mayorship of Bayamon, the position his father had served since 1977. He won the mayorship and has been reelected 6 more times.
