= José Antonio Dávila =

Puerto Rican writer

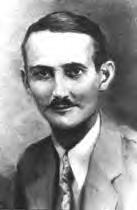
- Dr. José Antonio Dávila
- Born: José Antonio Dávila Morales; October 7, 1898; Bayamón, Puerto Rico
- Died: December 4, 1941 (aged 43); Bayamón, Puerto Rico
- Education: Thomas Jefferson University (MD)
- Occupation: Poet
- Spouse: Alma Blake
- Relatives: Virgilio Dávila Cabrera (father)
- Writing career
- Notable work: Vendimia
- Movement: postmodernism (?)

Dr. José Antonio Dávila (October 7, 1898 – December 4, 1941) was a postmodern Puerto Rican poet.

== Life and career ==
Dávila was born and raised in Bayamon, Puerto Rico, into a literary family; he received both his primary and secondary education here and went to high school in Santurce, San Juan.

== Early years ==
In 1918, he enrolled in the University of Puerto Rico and later transferred to Thomas Jefferson University in Philadelphia where he studied medicine, earning his medical degree in 1924; after graduating he established a medical practice there.

He was married to Alma Blake with whom he had a son (José Antonio Dávila Jr.). Dávila became fatally ill and had to abandon his medical practice. He was interned at the Saranac Lake Hospital in New York, but returned to Puerto Rico in 1930.

Dávila became a poet and received an award from the Puerto Rican Institute of Culture for his poem Vendimia (1940). His main source of inspiration was his father, the poet and Mayor of Bayamón, Virgilio Dávila.

== Written works ==
Much of Dávila's work was published posthumously. Besides Vendimia, his other works are:

- Los Motivos de Tristan ('The Motives of Tristan') (1957)
- Poemas (Poems) (1964)
- Almacen de Baratijas
- Carta de Recomendación "Señor: en breve llegará a tu cielo una tímida y dulce viejecita ..."

Davila also wrote a biography of the Bayamonese musician and composer Mariano Feliú Balseiro.

== Death ==
Dr José Antonio Dávila died on December 4, 1941, at the age of 43. He was buried next to his father at Cementerio Porta Coeli in his hometown Bayamón, Puerto Rico.

== Commemoration ==
The City of Bayamón has named a school and an avenue after him.

== See also ==
- List of Puerto Rican writers
- List of Puerto Ricans
- Puerto Rican literature
