= History of Romania =

Romania has been inhabited by humans since the paleolithic. During antiquity, the main population that lived in the area corresponding to modern-day Romania were the Dacians. Dacian civilisation prospered from the second century BC to the second century AD, resulting in the establishment of a Dacian kingdom as a regional power. Following several wars with the Roman Empire, Dacia was conquered in 106 AD, and the kingdom's core was turned into a Roman province. The province was abandoned by 276 AD following several invasions from various barbarian peoples. Many Romanian historians believe that the origin of the Romanians can be traced back to the Dacians and Romans intermixing, which in turn formed the basis of the Romanian ethnicity.

During the early Middle Ages, numerous migratory peoples moved across and settled the territory of Romania. A prominent Turkic population also settled Romanian territory, particularly the Cumans. Early Romanian culture was martially influenced by these peoples. Vlachs – Romance-language speakers in the Balkans – were first clearly attested in the 10th century, inhabiting areas on both sides of the Danube. By the 13th century, numerous small Vlach political entities abounded in areas such as Muntenia, Oltenia and Transylvania. These political entities gradually unified, and by the mid-14th century, the two major historical Romanian principalities had emerged, Wallachia and Moldavia.

The principalities partook in many conflicts against their often stronger neighbours, such as the Ottoman Empire. Eventually, they became vassal states to the Ottomans, however they always managed to preserve their autonomy as well as slowly progress a Romanian national identity. In 1600, Michael the Brave managed to unite all the Romanian-inhabited states, including Transylvania for the first time, however the union was short-lived and folded under pressure from the Habsburgs, Hungarians and Poles. Nevertheless, the Romanian identity continued to cultivate, culminating in movements such as the Transylvanian School and blossoming in the 19th century through the 1848 revolutions in both Wallachia and Moldavia. The modern Romanian state was established in 1859 through a personal union of the Danubian Principalities. The new state, which fought for and gained its independence in 1877, consolidated itself as a kingdom in 1881.

During World War I, after declaring its neutrality in 1914, Romania fought together with the Allied Powers from 1916. In the aftermath of the war, Bukovina, Bessarabia and Transylvania, as well as parts of the Banat, Crișana, and Maramureș united with Romania, resulting in the establishment of Greater Romania. In the summer of 1940, as a consequence of the Molotov–Ribbentrop Pact and Second Vienna Award, Romania was compelled to cede Bessarabia and Northern Bukovina to the Soviet Union and Northern Transylvania to Hungary. In November 1940, Romania signed the Tripartite Pact and, consequently, in June 1941 entered World War II on the Axis side, fighting against the Soviet Union until August 1944, when it joined the Allies and recovered Northern Transylvania. Following the war and occupation by the Red Army, Romania became a socialist republic and a member of the Warsaw Pact. After the 1989 Revolution, Romania began a transition towards democracy and a market economy. Romania joined NATO in 2004, and the European Union in 2007.

== Prehistory ==
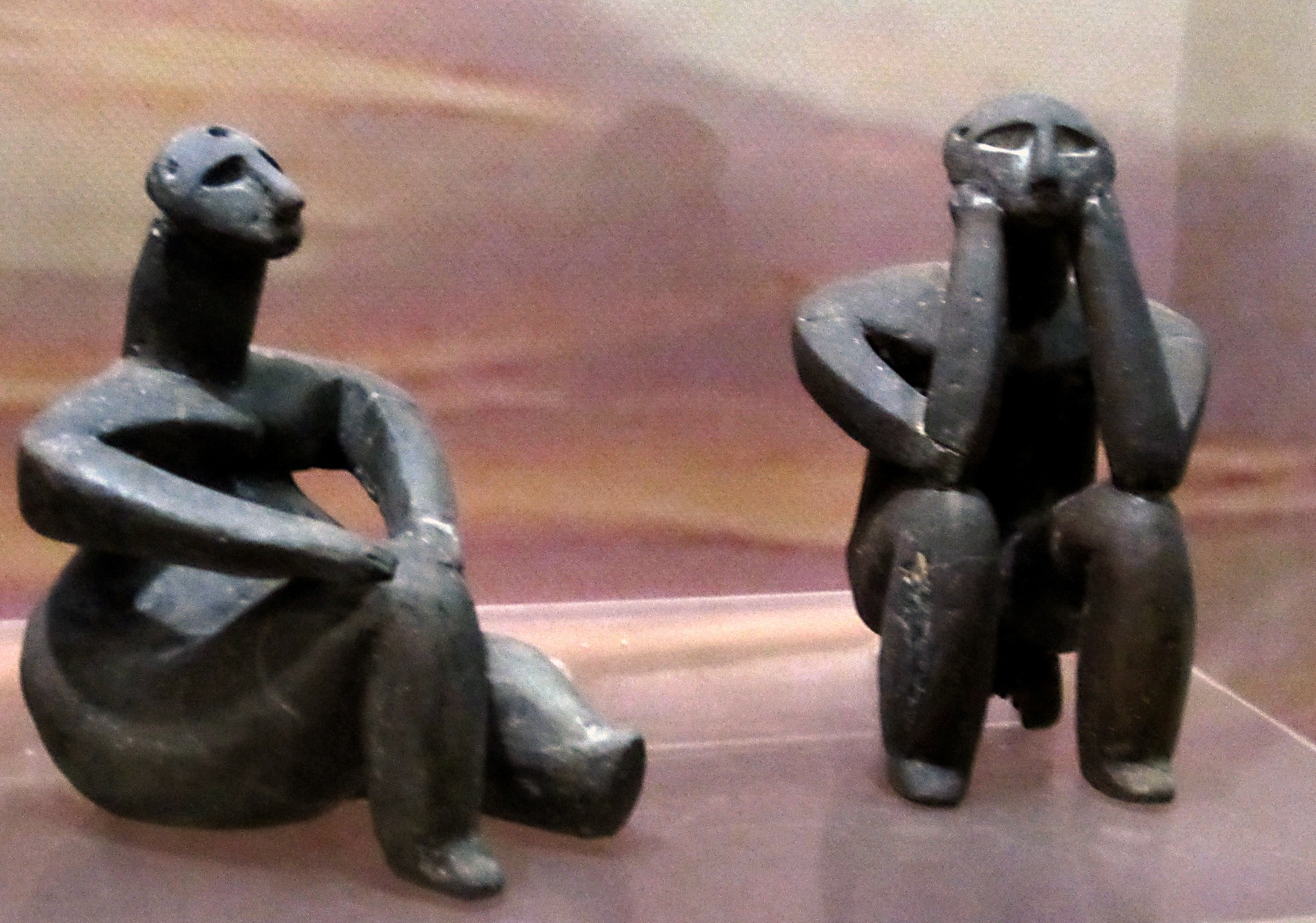
The thinkers of Hamangia, Neolithic Hamangia culture (c. 5250 – 4550 BC)

Remains of 34,950-year-old modern humans were discovered in present-day Romania when the Peștera cu Oase ("Cave with Bones") was uncovered in 2002. The Romanian fossils are among the oldest remains of Homo sapiens in Europe.

The Neolithic-Age Cucuteni area in northeastern Romania was the western region of one of the earliest European civilizations, known as the Cucuteni–Trypillia culture. The earliest-known salt works is at Poiana Slatinei near the village of Lunca; it was first used in the early Neolithic around 6050 BC by the Starčevo culture and later by the Cucuteni-Trypillia culture in the pre-Cucuteni period.

== Dacia ==
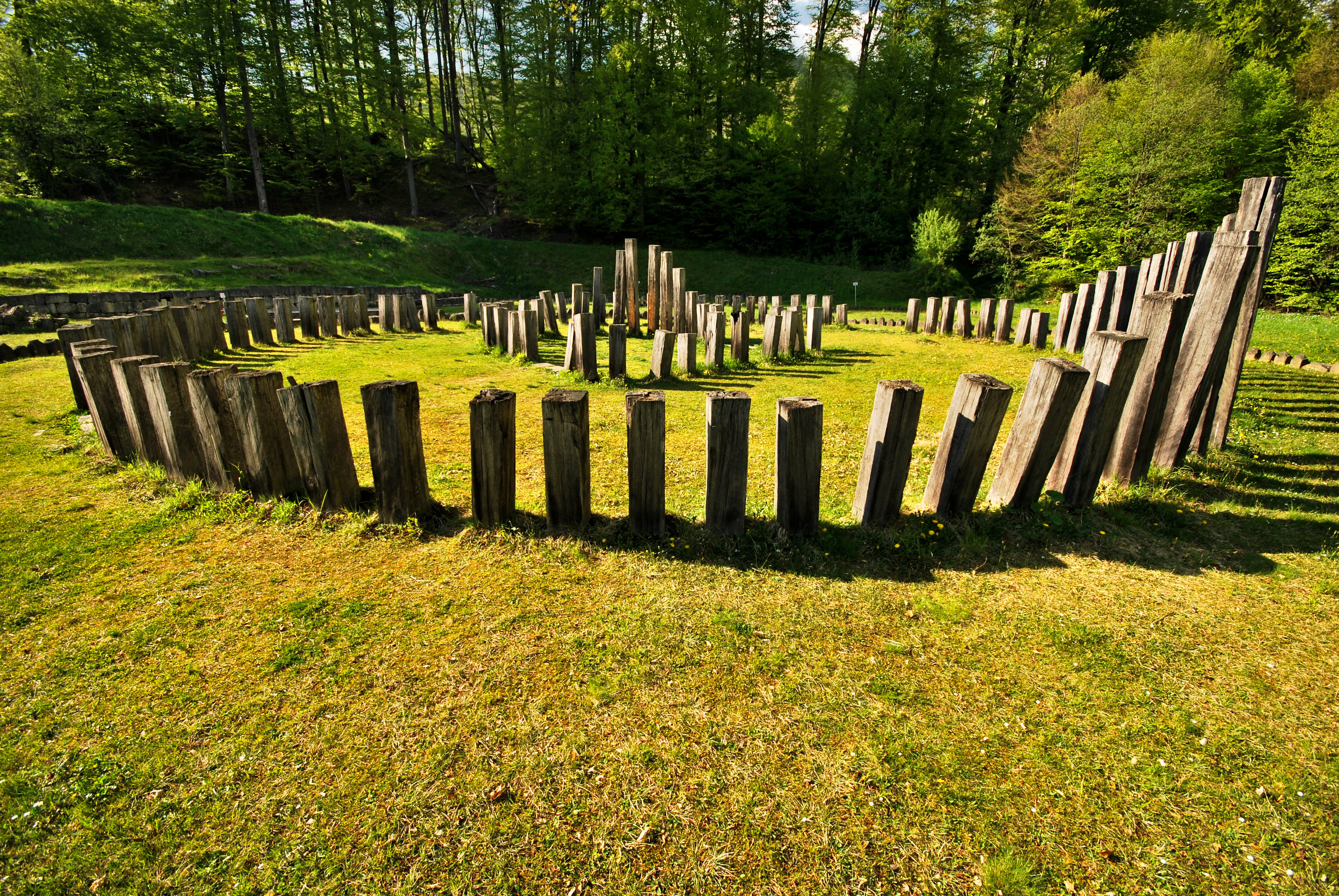
The sanctuaries of the ancient Dacian Kingdom capital, Sarmizegetusa Regia

The Dacians, who are widely accepted to be the same people as the Getae, were a branch of Thracians who inhabited Dacia, which corresponds with modern Romania, Moldova, northern Bulgaria, south-western Ukraine, Hungary east of the Danube river and West Banat in Serbia.

The earliest written evidence of people living in the territory of present-day Romania comes from Herodotus in Book IV of his Histories, written in c. 440 BC; He writes that the tribal union/confederation of the Getae were defeated by the Persian Emperor Darius the Great during his campaign against the Scythians. One of the most important artifacts from around this period was the Helmet of Coțofenești, which was stolen in 2025.

The Dacians are the most law-abiding and the bravest of the Thracians. They believe they are immortal, forever living in the following sense: they think they do not die and that the one who dies joins Zalmoxis, a divine being.

— Herodotus

Strabo's account of the lands inhabited by the Getae:

As for the southern part of Germany beyond the Albis, the portion which is just contiguous to that river is occupied by the Suevi; then immediately adjoining this is the land of the Getae, which, though narrow at first, stretching as it does along the Ister on its southern side and on the opposite side along the mountain-side of the Hercynian Forest (for the land of the Getae also embraces a part of the mountains), afterwards broadens out towards the north as far as the Tyregetae; but I cannot tell the precise boundaries.

The Dacians spoke a dialect of the Thracian language but were influenced culturally by the neighboring Scythians in the east and by the Celtic invaders of Transylvania in the 4th century.

Due to the fluctuating nature of the Dacian states, especially before the time of Burebista and before the 1st century AD, the Dacians would often be split into different kingdoms. Known rulers of the Dacians include Charnabon in the 5th century BC, Cothelas in the 4th century BC, Rex Histrianorum mentioned in 339 BC, Dual in the 3rd century BC, Moskon in the 3rd century BC, Dromichaetes in the 3rd century BC, Zalmodegicus around 200 BC, Rhemaxos also around 200 BC, Rubobostes before 168 BC, Zoltes after 168 BC, Oroles in the 2nd century BC, Dicomes in the 1st century BC, Rholes in the 1st century BC, Dapyx in the 1st century BC, Zyraxes in the 1st century BC, Burebista between 82 and 44 BC, Deceneus between 44 BC and around 27 BC, Thiamarkos between 1st century BC and 1st century AD, Cotiso between c. 40 BC and c.9 BC, Comosicus between 9 BC and 30 AD, Scorilo between c. 30 AD and 70 AD Coson in the 1st century AD, Duras between c. 69 AD to 87 AD, and Decebalus between 87 AD to 106 AD. Dacia became a province of the Roman Empire in 106 AD, conquered by Emperor Trajan. However the Free Dacians outside of the Roman Empire remain independent under Pieporus, king of Dacian Costoboci in the 2nd century AD, and possibly Tarbus in the 2nd century AD.

The Dacia of King Burebista (82–44 BC) stretched from the Black Sea to the source of the river Tisa and from the Balkan Mountains to Bohemia. During that period, the Geto-Dacians conquered a wider territory and Dacia extended from the Middle Danube to the Black Sea littoral (between Apollonia and Olbia) and from present-day Slovakia's mountains to the Balkan mountains. In 53 BC, Julius Caesar stated that the lands of the Dacians started on the eastern edge of the Hercynian Forest (Black Forest).

Geto-Dacians inhabited both sides of the Tisa river prior to the rise of the Celtic Boii and again after the latter were defeated by the Dacians under the king Burebista. It seems likely that the Dacian state arose as a tribal confederacy, which was united only by charismatic leadership. Before 168 BC, under the rule of king Rubobostes in present-day Transylvania, the Dacians' power in the Carpathian basin increased after they defeated the Celts, who held power in the region since the Celtic invasion of Transylvania in the 4th century BC.

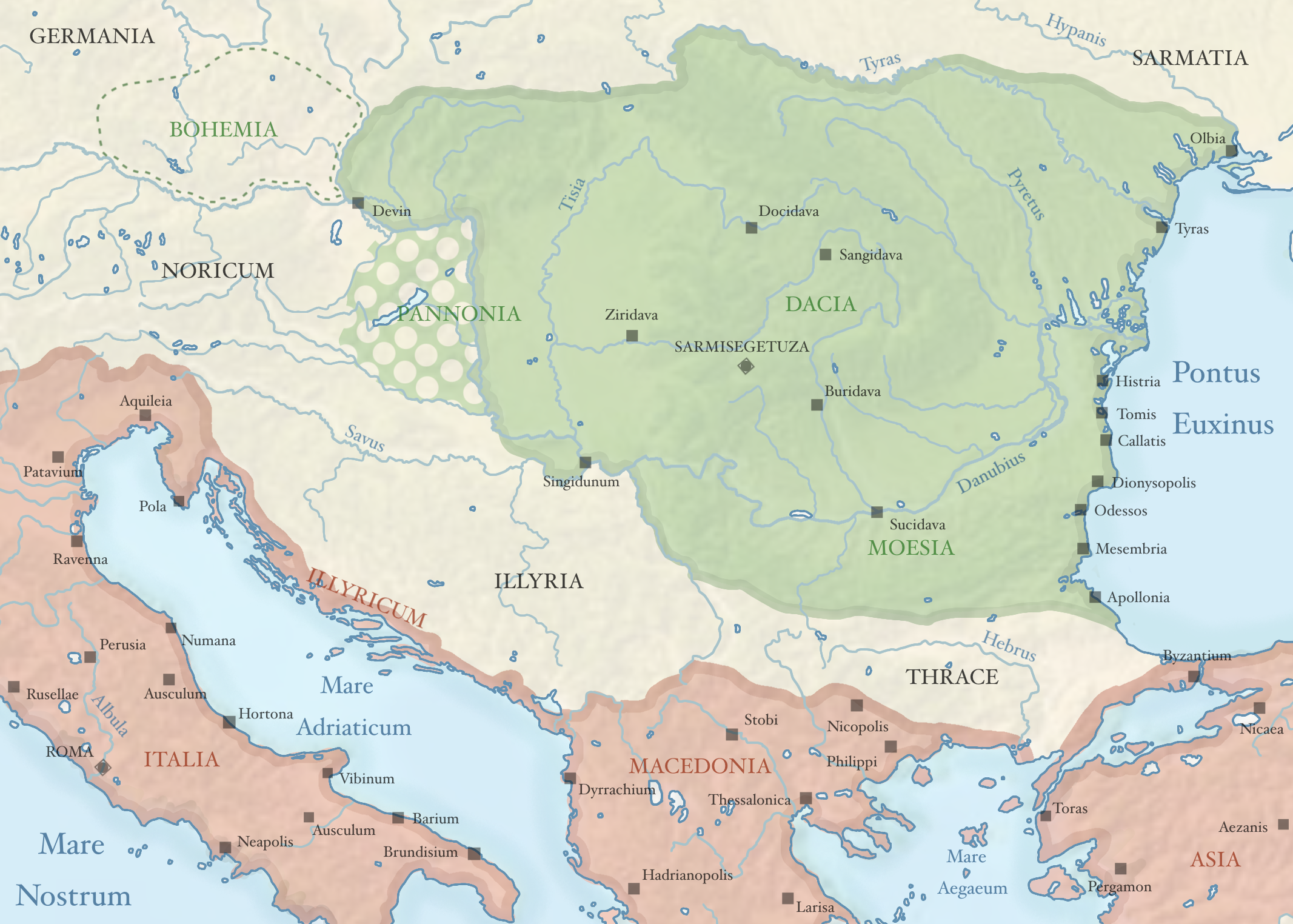
Map depicting the Dacian Kingdom, including its annexed territories and areas of approximate influence including Pannonia and Bohemia.

A kingdom of Dacia also existed as early as the first half of the 2nd century BC under King Oroles. Conflicts with the Bastarnae and the Romans (112–109 BC, 74 BC), against whom they had assisted the Scordisci and Dardani, greatly weakened the resources of the Dacians. The Roman historian Trogus Pompeius wrote about king Oroles punishing his soldiers into sleeping at their wives' feet and doing the household chores, because of their initial failure in defeating the invaders. Subsequently, the now "highly motivated" Dacian army defeated the Bastarnae.

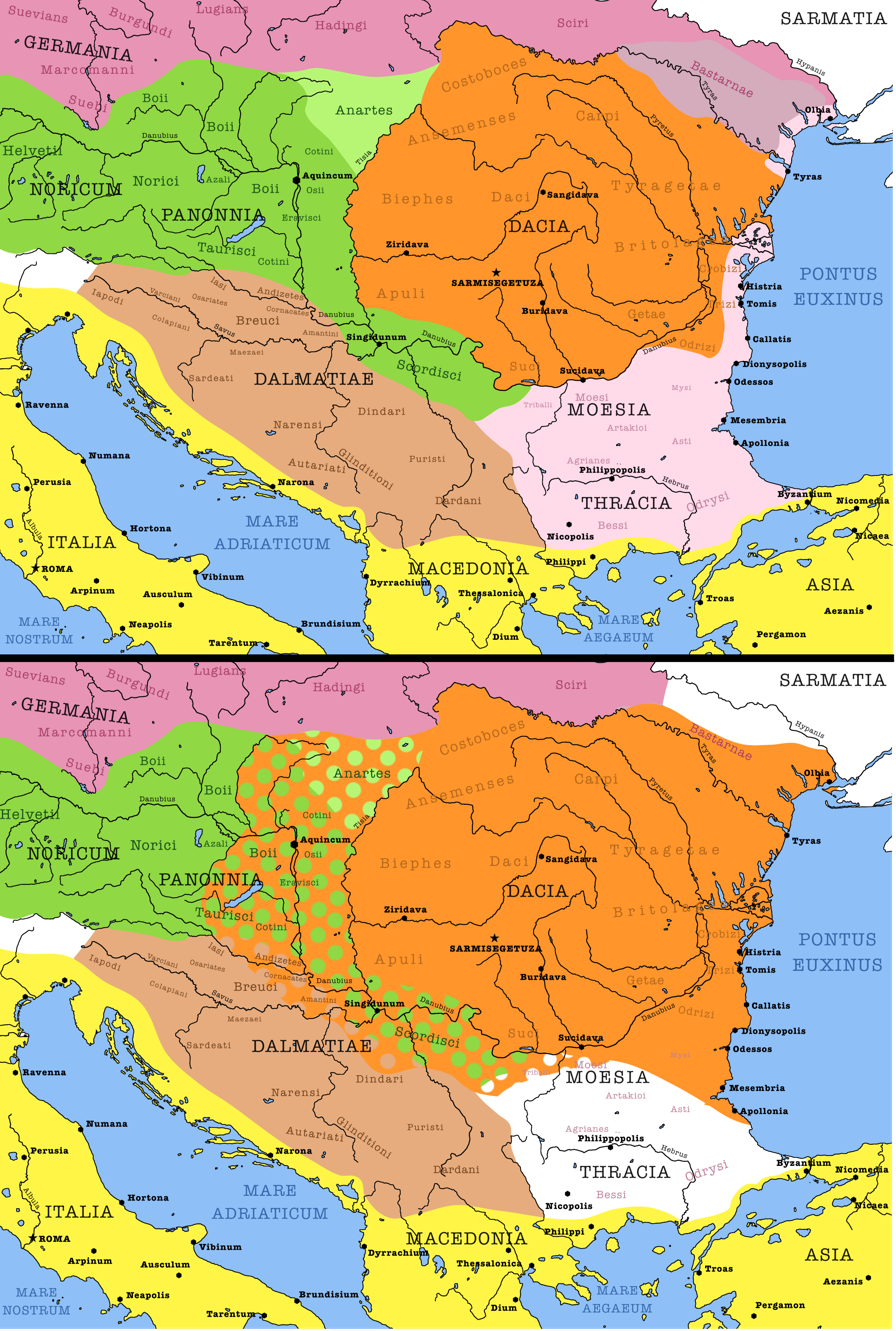
The upper map shows Dacia’s territory at the beginning of Burebista’s rule, while the lower map depicts its territory at the end of his reign.

Burebista (Boerebista), a contemporary of Julius Caesar, ruled Geto-Dacian tribes between 82 BC and 44 BC. He reorganized the army and attempted to raise the moral standard and obedience of the people by persuading them to give up wine. During his reign, the limits of the Dacian Kingdom were extended to their maximum. The Bastarnae and Boii were conquered, and even the Greek towns of Olbia and Apollonia on the Black Sea (Pontus Euxinus) recognized Burebista's authority. In 53 BC, Caesar stated that the Dacian territory was on the eastern border of the Hercynian Forest.

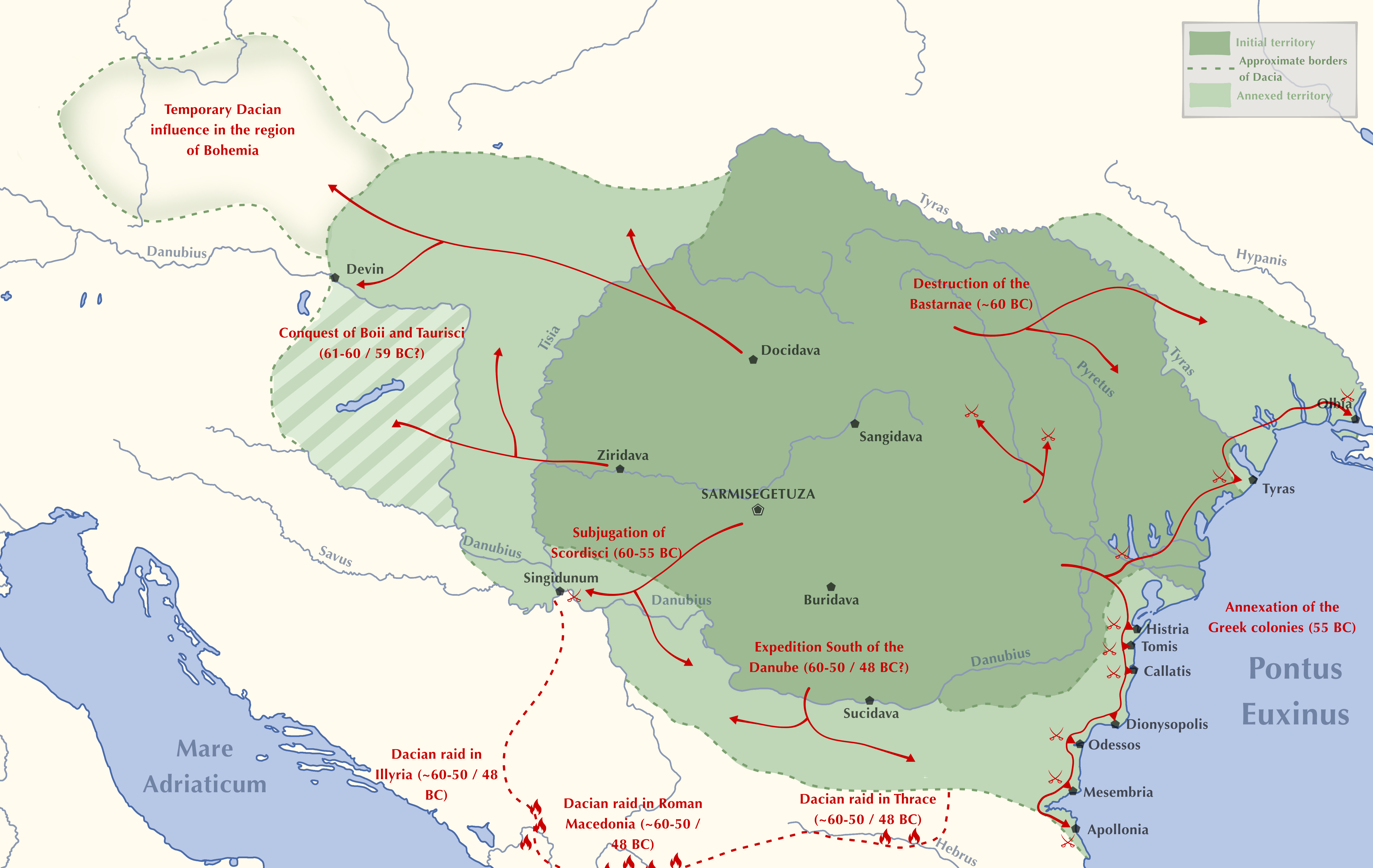
Burebista campaigns and territorial occupations.

Burebista suppressed the indigenous minting of coinages by four major tribal groups, adopting imported or copied Roman denarii as a monetary standard. During his reign, Burebista transferred the Geto-Dacian capital from Argedava to Sarmizegetusa Regia. For at least one and a half centuries, Sarmizegetusa served as the Dacians’ capital and reached its zenith under King Decebalus. The Dacians appeared so formidable that Caesar contemplated launching an expedition against them, which was prevented by his death in 44 BC. That same year, Burebista was assassinated, and the kingdom was subsequently divided into four—later five—parts under separate rulers.

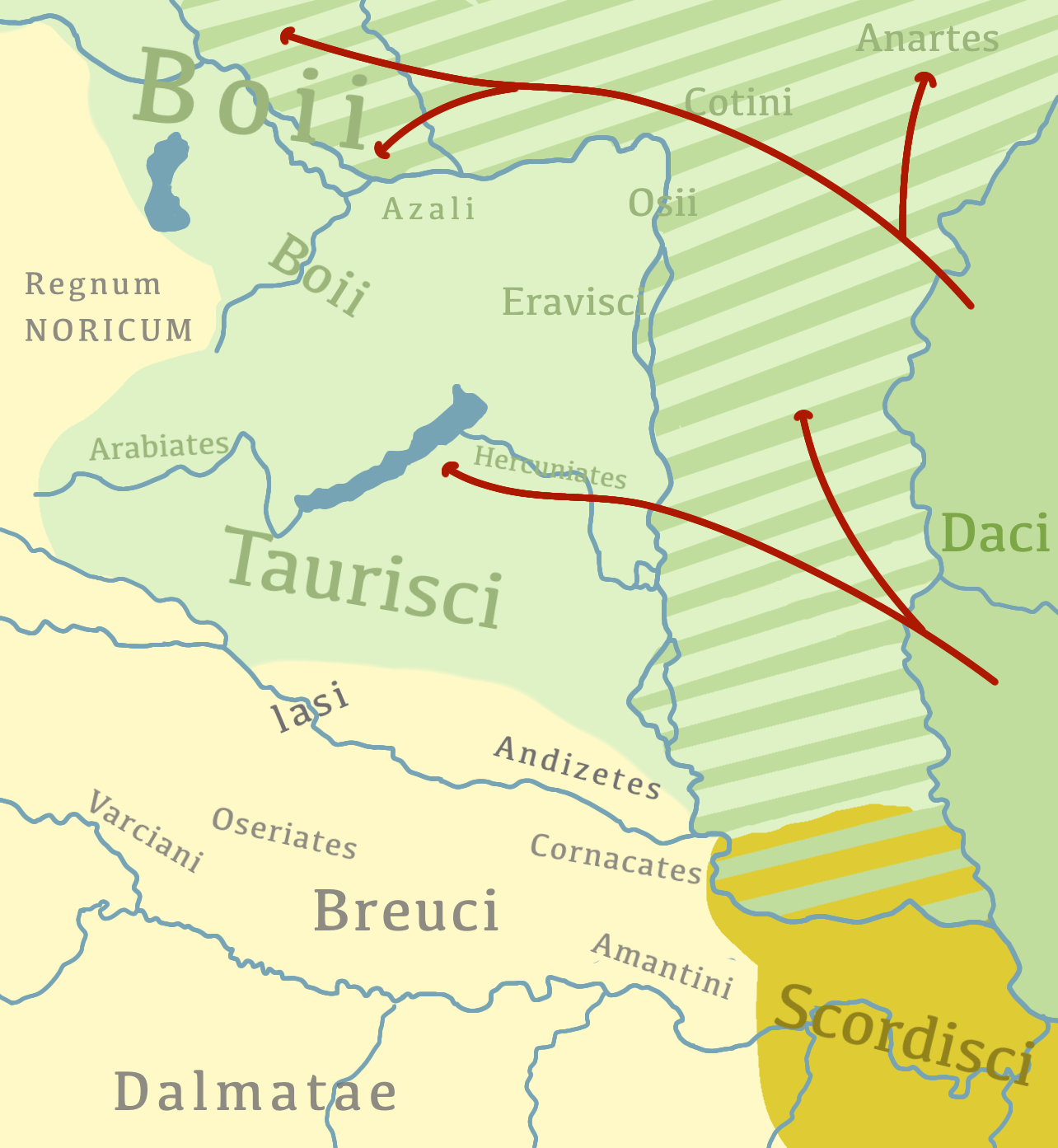
Dacian invasion of Boii and Taurisci. c. 61-60 BC / 59 BC?

The Dacians are often mentioned during the reign of Augustus, who claimed they were compelled to recognize Roman supremacy. However, they were by no means subdued, and in later times, to maintain their independence, they seized every opportunity to cross the frozen Danube during the winter, ravaging Roman cities in the province of Moesia.

Although the Getae and Daci once attained to very great power, so that they actually could send forth an expedition of two hundred thousand men, they now find themselves reduced to as few as forty thousand, and they have come close to the point of yielding obedience to the Romans, though as yet they are not absolutely submissive, because of the hopes which they base on the Germans, who are enemies to the Romans.

— Strabo

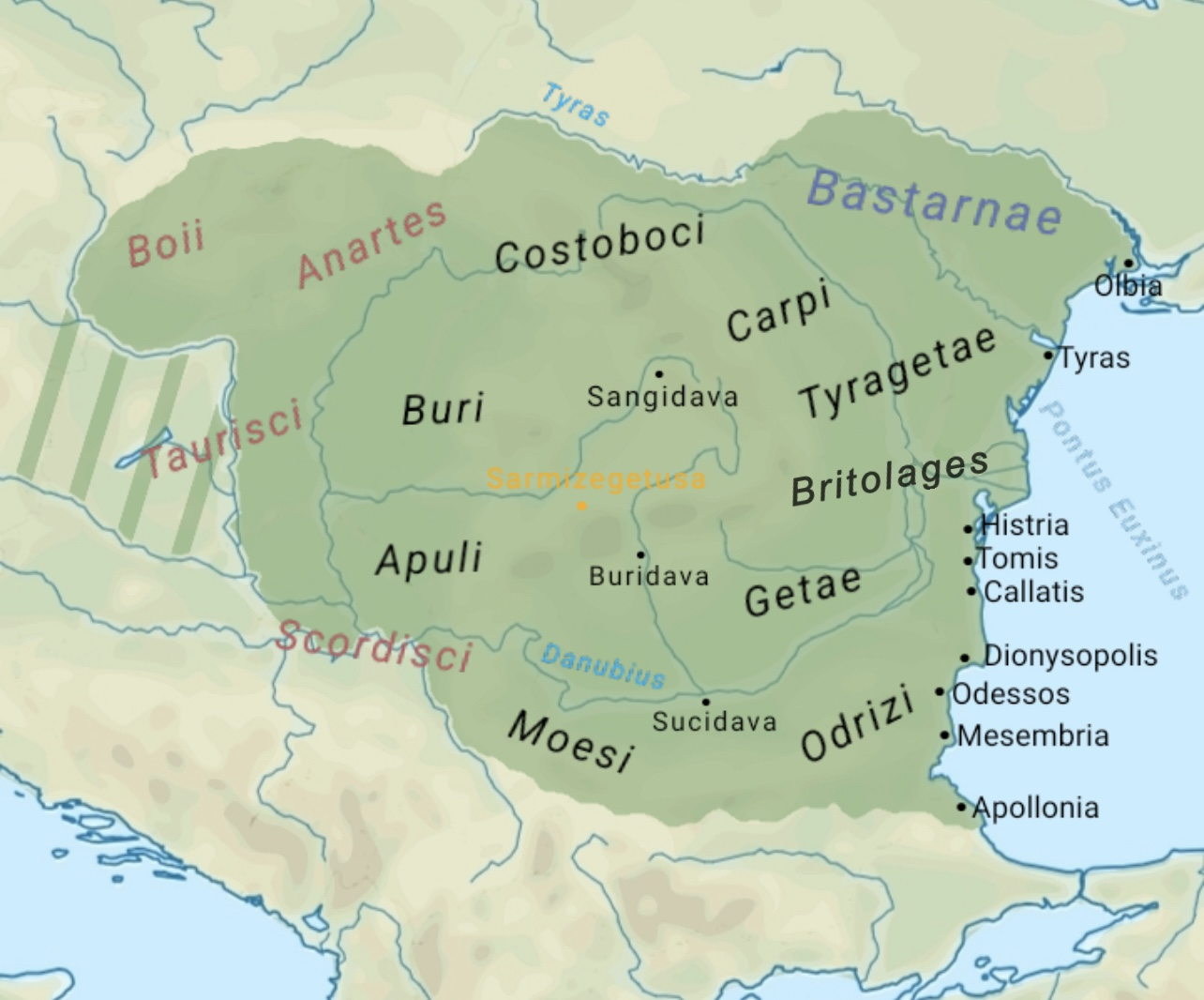
Dacian kingdom c. 50 BC

During the War of Actium, King Cotiso found himself courted by the two Roman antagonists, Octavian and Mark Antony. Cotiso was in a strong position to dictate the terms of any alliance. Octavian (later) Augustus worried about the frontier and possible alliance between Mark Antony and the Dacians, and he plotted an expedition against Dacia around 35 BC. Despite several small conflicts, no serious campaigns were mounted. King Cotiso chose to ally himself with Mark Antony. According to Alban Dewes Winspear and Lenore Kramp Geweke he "proposed that the war should be fought in Macedonia rather than Epirus. Had his proposal been accepted, the subjection of Antonius might have been less easily accomplished."

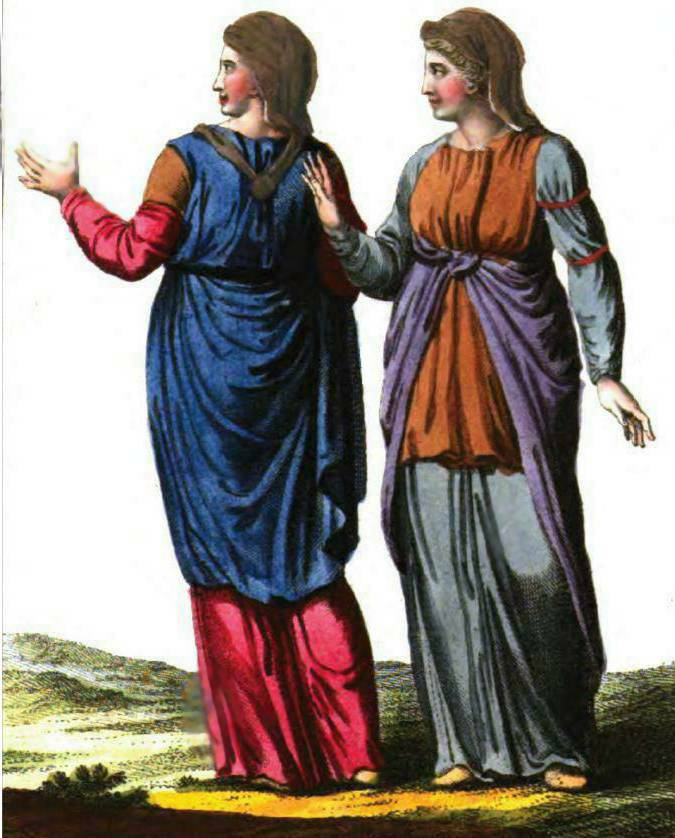
A 19th century depiction of Dacian women

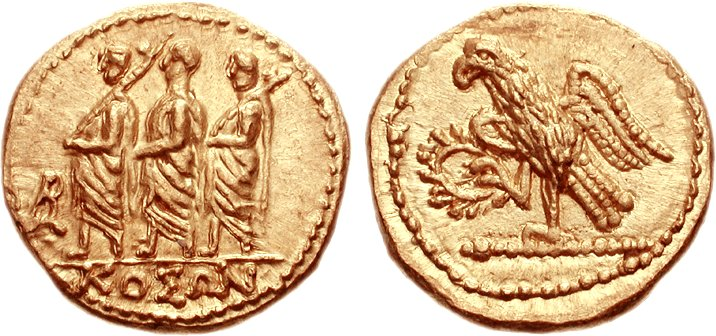
Geto-Dacian Koson, mid 1st century BC

According to Appian, Mark Antony is responsible for the statement that Augustus sought to secure the goodwill of Cotiso by giving him his daughter, and he himself marrying a daughter of Cotiso. According to Suetonius, Cotiso refused the alliance and joined the party of Mark Antony. Suetonius (LXIII, Life of Augustus) says Mark Antony wrote that Augustus betrothed his daughter Julia to marry Cotiso to create an alliance between the two men. This failed when Cotiso betrayed Augustus. According to Cassius Dio, the story about the proposed marriages is hardly credible and may have been invented by Mark Antony as propaganda to offset his own alliance with Cleopatra.

After Augustus's victory in the civil wars, the Romans punished the Dacian ruler, who was apparently defeated in battle around 25 BC. In his account of his achievements as emperor, the Res Gestae, Augustus claimed that the Dacians had been subdued. This was not entirely true, because Dacian troops frequently crossed the Danube to ravage parts of Pannonia and Moesia. He may have survived until the campaign of Marcus Vinicius in the Dacian area c.9 BC. Vinicius was the first Roman commander to cross the Danube and invade Dacia itself. Ioana A. Oltean argues that Cotiso probably died at some point during this campaign. According to Jordanes Cotiso was succeeded by Comosicus, about whom nothing is known beyond the name. King Scorilo was Comosicus' successor and may have been the father of Decebalus. The Roman historian Jordanes lists a series of Dacian kings before Decebalus, placing a ruler called "Coryllus" between Comosicus and the independently attested Duras, who preceded Decebalus as king. Coryllus is supposed to have presided over a long peaceful 40-year rule, however, the name Coryllus is not mentioned by any other historian, and it has been argued that it "is a misspelling of Scorilo, a relatively common Dacian name". On this basis, Coryllus has been equated with the Scorilo named on an ancient Dacian pot bearing the words “Decebalus per Scorilo”. Though far from certain, this has also been translated as "Decebalus son of Scorilo". If so, this might mean that Decebalus was the son of Scorilo, with Duras possibly being either an older son or a brother of Scorilo. A Dacian king (dux Dacorum) called Scorilo is also mentioned by Frontinus, who says he was in power during a period of turmoil in Rome. From this evidence and references to Dacian kings elsewhere, it is suggested that Scorilo probably ruled from the 30s or 40s AD through to 69–70.

The Dacians regularly raided into Roman territory in Moesia. The emperors Tiberius and Caligula solved this problem by paying protection money to the Dacians in the form of annual subsidies. This policy appears to have coincided with the reign of King Scorilo. Scorilo's brother was apparently held captive for a period in Rome, but was released in exchange for a promise that the Dacians would not intervene in Rome's volatile power-politics. During the reign of Emperor Nero, troops were withdrawn from the Dacian border. When Nero was overthrown in 69, the empire was plunged into turmoil in the Year of Four Emperors. The Dacians appear to have tried to take advantage of the situation to launch an invasion of Moesia in alliance with the Sarmatian Roxolani. The invasion was ill-timed. Licinius Mucianus, a supporter of Vespasian, was advancing with an army through Moesia towards Rome to overthrow Vitellius. The Dacians unexpectedly encountered his forces and suffered a major defeat. Scorilo appears to have died around this time.

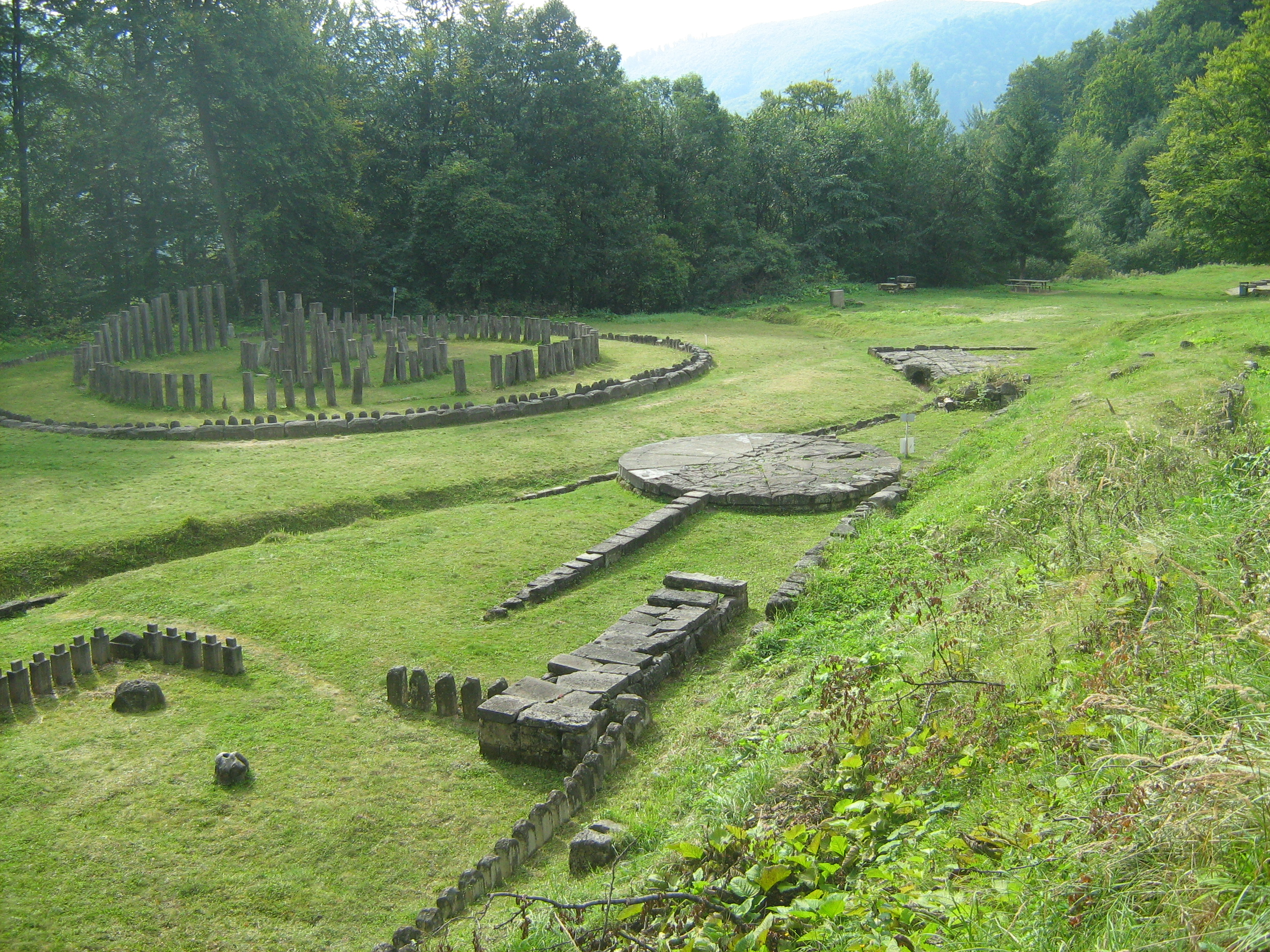
The sanctuaries in the ruined Sarmizegetusa Regia, the capital of ancient Dacia

King Duras ruled between the years AD 69 and 87, during the time that Domitian ruled the Roman Empire. He was one of a series of rulers following the Great King Burebista. Duras' immediate successor was Decebalus. Duras may be identical to the "Diurpaneus" (or "Dorpaneus") identified in Roman sources as the Dacian leader who, in the winter of 85, ravaged the southern banks of the Danube, which the Romans defended for many years. Many authors refer to him as "Duras-Diurpaneus". Other scholars argue that Duras and Diurpaneus are different individuals, or that Diurpaneus is identical to Decebalus.

The Roman governor of Moesia, Oppius Sabinus, raised an army and went to war with the Dacians following the Dacian (Getae) raids into Roman territory. Diurpaneus and his people defeated and decapitated Oppius Sabinus. When news of the defeat reached Rome, the citizens became fearful that the conquering enemy would invade and spread destruction further into the Empire. Because of this fear, Domitian was obliged to move with his entire army into Illyria and Moesia, the latter of which was now split into Upper and Lower regions. He ordered his commander Cornelius Fuscus to cross the Danube. The Dacians were pushed back across the Danube, but Fuscus suffered a crushing defeat when ambushed by "Diurpaneus". At this point, the probably elderly Duras seems to have peacefully ceded power to Decebalus.

King Decebalus ruled the Dacians between AD 87 and 106. The frontiers of Decebal's Dacia were marked by the Tisa River to the west, by the trans-Carpathians to the north and by the Dniester River to the east.

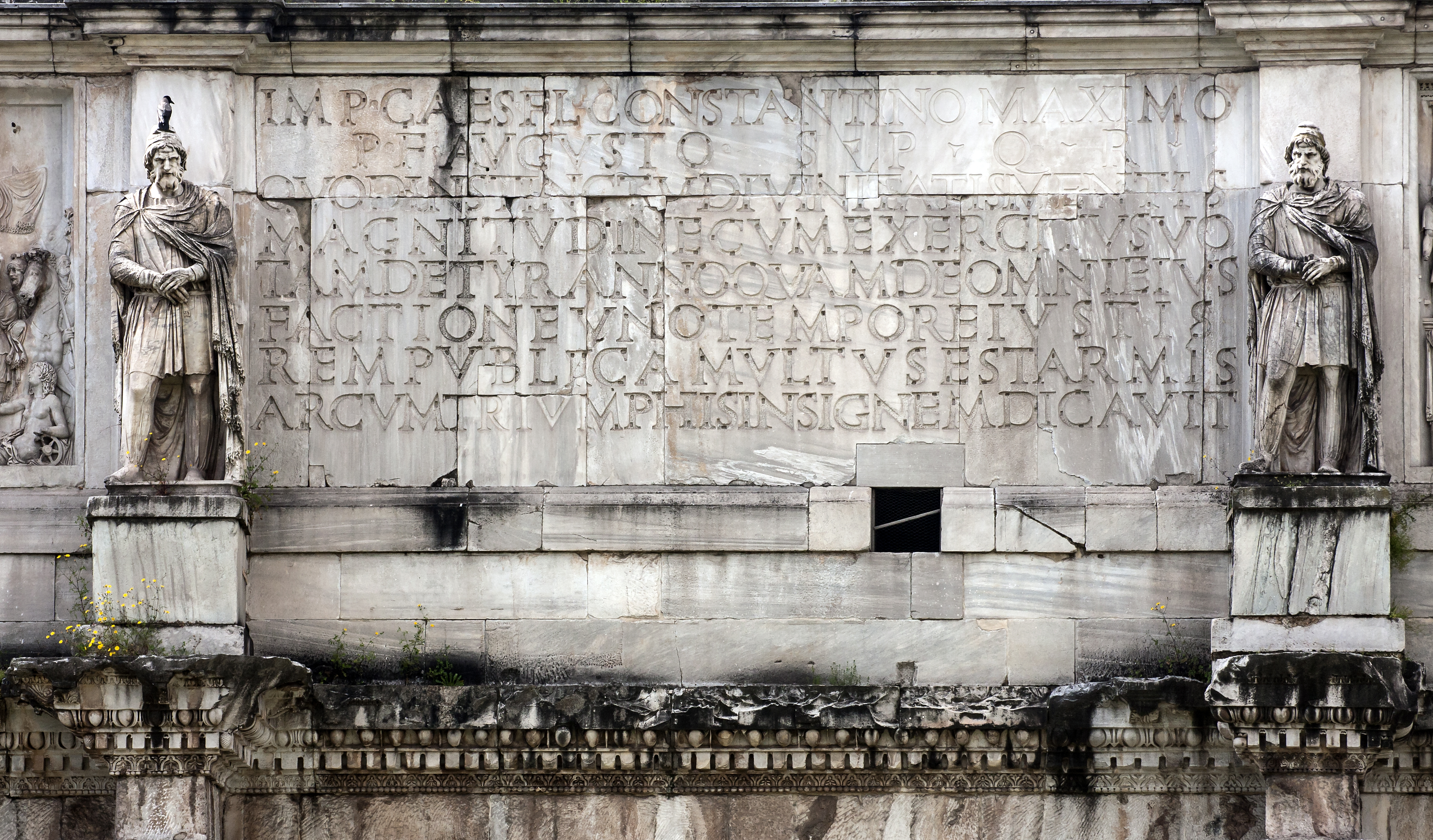
Two of the eight marble statues of Dacian warriors surmounting the Arch of Constantine in Rome

From AD 85 to 89, the Dacians under Decebalus were engaged in two wars with the Romans. In AD 85, the Dacians had swarmed over the Danube and pillaged Moesia. In AD 87, the Roman troops sent by the Emperor Domitian against them under Cornelius Fuscus, were defeated and Cornelius Fuscus was killed by the Dacians by authority of their ruler, Diurpaneus. After this victory, Diurpaneus took the name of Decebalus, but the Romans were victorious in the Battle of Tapae in AD 88 and a truce was drawn up . The next year, AD 88, new Roman troops under Tettius Julianus, gained a significant advantage, but were obligated to make a humiliating peace following the defeat of Domitian by the Marcomanni, leaving the Dacians effectively independent. Decebalus was given the status of "king client to Rome", receiving military instructors, craftsmen and money from Rome.

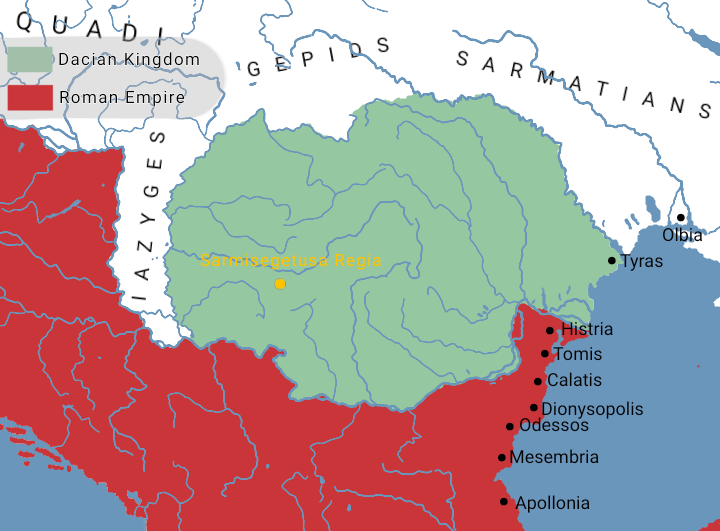
The Dacian kingdom under Decebalus

To increase the glory of his reign, restore the finances of Rome, and end a treaty perceived as humiliating, Trajan resolved on the conquest of Dacia, the capture of the famous Treasure of Decebalus, and control over the Dacian gold mines of Transylvania. The result of his first campaign (101–102) was the siege of the Dacian capital Sarmizegethusa and the occupation of part of the country. Emperor Trajan recommenced hostilities against Dacia and, following an uncertain number of battles, and with Trajan's troops pressing towards the Dacian capital Sarmizegethusa, Decebalus once more sought terms.

Decebalus rebuilt his power over the following years and attacked Roman garrisons again in AD 105. In response Trajan again marched into Dacia, attacking the Dacian capital in the siege of Sarmizegethusa, and razing it to the ground, the defeated Dacian king Decebalus committed suicide. In the following years, a new city was built on the ruins of the Dacian capital named Ulpia Traiana Sarmizegetusa. With part of Dacia quelled as the Roman province Dacia Traiana. Trajan subsequently invaded the Parthian empire to the east. Rome's borders in the east were governed indirectly in this period, through a system of client states, which led to less direct campaigning than in the west.

The weapon most associated with the Dacian forces that fought against Trajan's army during his invasions of Dacia was the falx, a single-edged scythe-like weapon. The falx was able to inflict horrible wounds on opponents, easily disabling or killing the heavily armored Roman legionaries. Trajan erected the Column of Trajan in Rome to commemorate his victory.

=== Roman Dacia (106–275 AD) ===
Roman Dacia, between 106 and 271 AD

Roman Dacia, also known as Dacia Felix, was organized as an imperial province. It is estimated that the population of Roman Dacia ranging from 650,000 to 1,200,000. The area was the focus of a massive Roman colonization. New mines were opened and ore extraction intensified, while agriculture, stock breeding, and commerce flourished. Roman Dacia was of great importance to the military stationed throughout the Balkans and became an urban province, with about ten cities known and all of them originating from old military camps. Eight of these held the highest rank of colonia. Ulpia Traiana Sarmizegetusa was the financial, religious, and legislative center and where the imperial procurator (finance officer) had his seat, while Apulum was Roman Dacia's military center. The region was soon settled by the retired veterans who had served in the Dacian Wars, principally the Fifth (Macedonia), Eleventh (Claudia), and Fourteenth (Gemina) legions.

While it is certain that colonists in large numbers were imported from all over the empire to settle in Roman Dacia, this appears to be true for the newly created Roman towns only. The lack of epigraphic evidence for native Dacian names in the towns suggests an urban–rural split between Roman multi-ethnic urban centers and the native Dacian rural population. On at least two occasions the Dacians rebelled against Roman authority: first in 117 AD, which caused the return of Trajan from the east, and in 158 AD when they were put down by Marcus Statius Priscus.

Some scholars have used the lack of civitates peregrinae in Roman Dacia, where indigenous peoples were organized into native townships, as evidence for the Roman depopulation of Dacia. Prior to its incorporation into the empire, Dacia was a kingdom ruled by one king, and did not possess a regional tribal structure that could easily be turned into the Roman civitas system as used successfully in other provinces of the empire.

Roman walls in Dacia

As per usual Roman practice, Dacian males were recruited into auxiliary units and dispatched across the empire. The Vexillation Dacorum Parthica accompanied the emperor Septimius Severus during his Parthian expedition, while the cohort I Ulpia Dacorum was posted to Cappadocia. Others included the II Aurelia Dacorum in Pannonia Superior, the cohort I Aelia Dacorum in Roman Britain, and the II Augusta Dacorum milliaria in Moesia Inferior. There are a number of preserved relics originating from cohort I Aelia Dacorum, with one inscription describing the sica, a distinctive Dacian weapon. Numerous Roman military diplomas issued for Dacian soldiers discovered after 1990 indicate that veterans preferred to return to their place of origin; per usual Roman practice, these veterans were given Roman citizenship upon their discharge.

In an attempt to fill the cities, cultivate the fields, and mine the ore, a large-scale attempt at colonization took place with colonists coming in "from all over the Roman world". The colonists were a heterogeneous mix: of the some 3,000 names preserved in inscriptions found by the 1990s, 74% (c. 2,200) were Latin, 14% (c. 420) were Greek, 4% (c. 120) were Illyrian, 2.3% (c. 70) were Celtic, 2% (c. 60) were Thraco-Dacian, and another 2% (c. 60) were Semites from Syria. Regardless of their place of origin, the settlers and colonists were a physical manifestation of Roman civilization and imperial culture, bringing with them the most effective Romanizing mechanism: the use of Latin as the new lingua franca.

The first settlement at Sarmizegetusa was made up of Roman citizens who had retired from their legions. Based upon the location of names scattered throughout the province, it has been argued that a large percentage of colonists originated from Noricum and western Pannonia. Specialist miners (the Pirusti tribesmen) were brought in from Dalmatia.

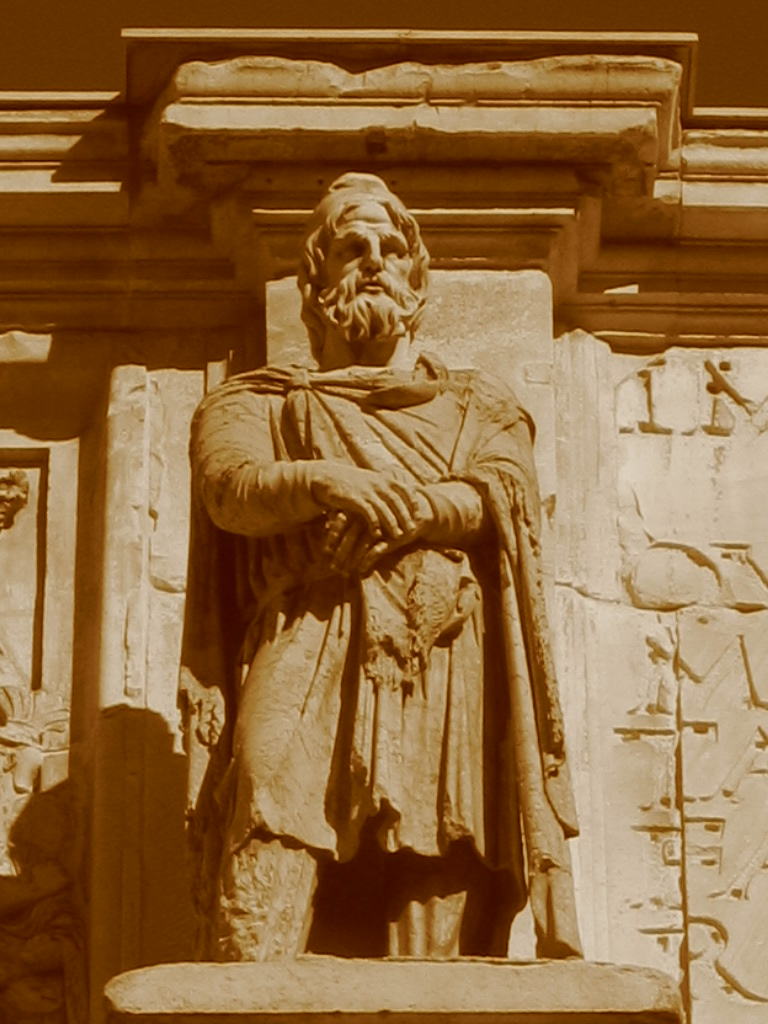
Tarabostes on the Arch of Constantine

Although the Romans conquered and destroyed the ancient Kingdom of Dacia, much of the land remained outside of Roman Imperial authority. The conquest changed the balance of power in the region and was the catalyst for a renewed alliance of Germanic and Celtic tribes and kingdoms against the Roman Empire. However, the material advantages of the Roman Imperial system was attractive to the surviving aristocracy. Afterwards, many of the Dacians became Romanized (see also Origin of Romanians). In AD 183, war broke out in Dacia: few details are available, but it appears two future contenders for the throne of emperor Commodus, Clodius Albinus and Pescennius Niger, both distinguished themselves in the campaign.

According to Lactantius, the Roman emperor Decius (AD 249–251) had to restore Roman Dacia from the Carpo-Dacians of Zosimus "having undertaken an expedition against the Carpi, who had then possessed themselves of Dacia and Moesia".

Even so, the Germanic and Celtic kingdoms, particularly the Gothic tribes, slowly moved toward the Dacian borders, and within a generation were making assaults on the province. Ultimately, the Goths succeeded in dislodging the Romans and restoring the "independence" of Dacia following Emperor Aurelian's withdrawal, in 275. At the boundaries of Roman Dacia, Carpi (Free Dacians) were still strong enough to sustain five battles in eight years against the Romans from AD 301–308. Roman Dacia was left in AD 275 by the Romans, to the Carpi again, and not to the Goths. There were still Dacians in AD 336, against whom Constantine the Great fought.

The province was abandoned by Roman troops, and, according to the Breviarium historiae Romanae by Eutropius, Roman citizens "from the towns and lands of Dacia" were resettled to the interior of Moesia. Under Diocletian, c. AD 296, in order to defend the Roman border, fortifications were erected by the Romans on both banks of the Danube.

=== Constantinian reconquest of Dacia ===
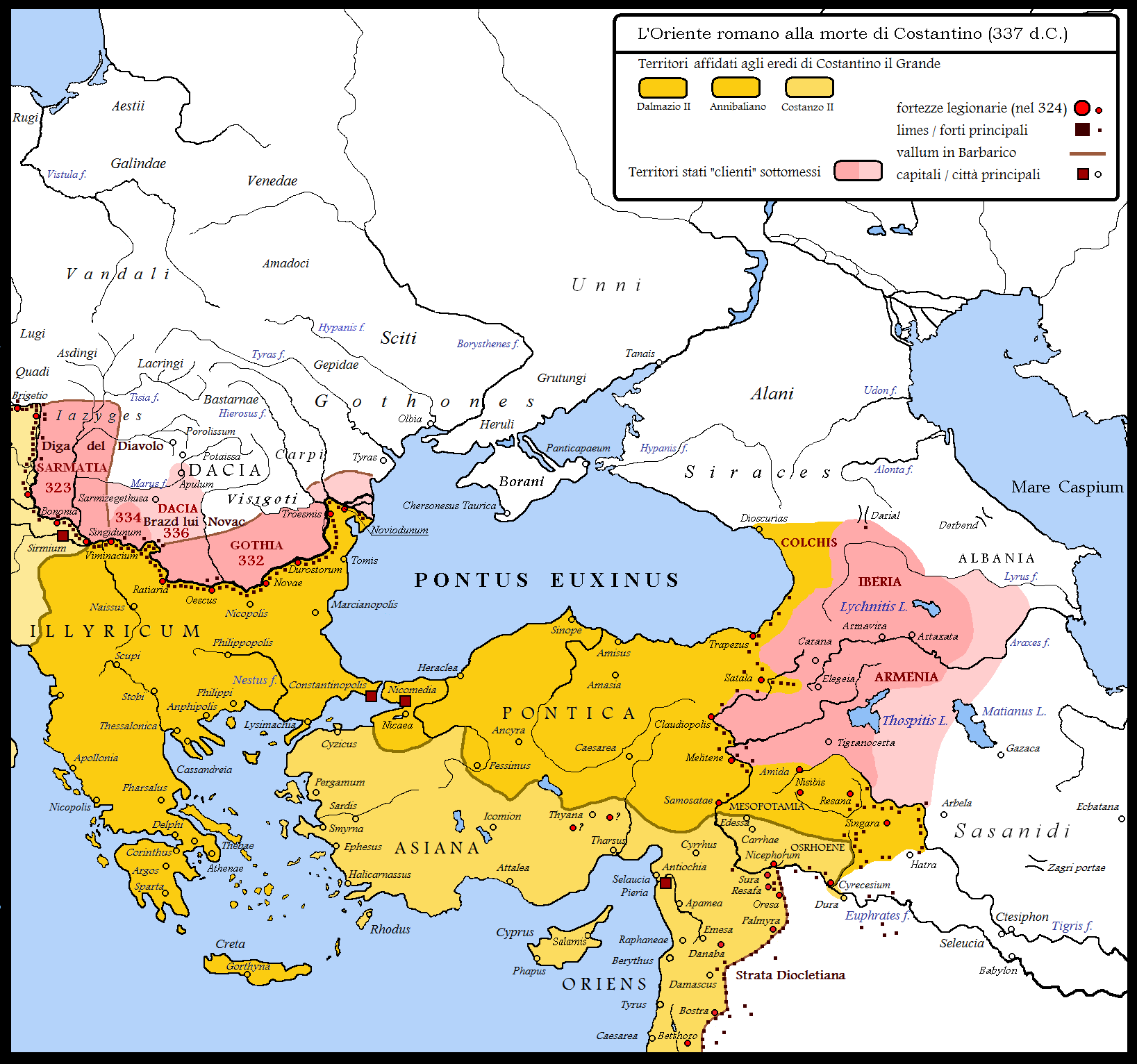
Dacia during Constantine the Great

In 328 the emperor Constantine the Great inaugurated the Constantine's Bridge (Danube) at Sucidava, (today Corabia in Romania) in hopes of reconquering Dacia, a province that had been abandoned under Aurelian. In the late winter of 332, Constantine campaigned with the Sarmatians against the Goths. The weather and lack of food cost the Goths dearly: reportedly, nearly one hundred thousand died before they submitted. In celebration of this victory Constantine took the title Gothicus Maximus and claimed the subjugated territory as the new province of Gothia. In 334, after Sarmatian commoners had overthrown their leaders, Constantine led a campaign against the tribe. He won a victory in the war and extended his control over the region, as remains of camps and fortifications in the region indicate. Constantine resettled some Sarmatian exiles as farmers in Illyrian and Roman districts, and conscripted the rest into the army. The new frontier in Dacia was along the Brazda lui Novac line supported by Castra of Hinova, Rusidava and Castra of Pietroasele. The limes passed to the north of Castra of Tirighina-Bărboși and ended at Sasyk Lagoon near the Dniester River. Constantine took the title Dacicus maximus in 336. Some Roman territories north of the Danube resisted until Justinian.

Victohali, Taifals, and Thervingians are tribes mentioned inhabiting Dacia in 350, after the Romans left. Archaeological evidence suggests that Gepids were disputing Transylvania with Taifals and Tervingians. Taifals, once independent from Gothia, became federati of the Romans, from whom they obtained the right to settle Oltenia.

In 376 the region was conquered by Huns, who kept it until the death of Attila in 453. The Gepid tribe, ruled by Ardaric, used it as their base, until in 566 it was destroyed by Lombards. Lombards abandoned the country and the Avars (second half of the 6th century) dominated the region for 230 years, until their kingdom was destroyed by Charlemagne in 791. At the same time, Slavic people arrived.

The Hellenic chronicle could possibly qualify to the first testimony of Romanians in Pannonia and Eastern Europe during the time of Attila, implying that the formation of Proto-Romanian (or Common Romanian) from Vulgar Latin started in the 5th century. The words "torna, torna fratre" (return, return brother) recorded in connection with a Roman campaign across the Balkan Mountains by Theophylact Simocatta and Theophanes the Confessor evidence the development of a Romance language in the late 6th century. The words were shouted "in native parlance" by a local soldier in 587 or 588. The 11th-century Persian writer, Gardizi, wrote about a Christian people "from the Roman Empire" called N.n.d.r, inhabiting the lands along the Danube. He describes them as "more numerous than the Hungarians, but weaker". Historian Adolf Armbruster identified this people as the Romanians. Hungarian historiography identifies this people as the Bulgarians.

=== Name ===
The Dacians were known as Geta (plural Getae) in Ancient Greek writings, and as Dacus (plural Daci) or Getae in Roman documents, but also as Dagae and Gaete as depicted on the late Roman map Tabula Peutingeriana. It was Herodotus who first used the ethnonym Getae in his Histories. In Greek and Latin, in the writings of Julius Caesar, Strabo, and Pliny the Elder, the people became known as 'the Dacians'. Getae and Dacians were interchangeable terms, or used with some confusion by the Greeks. Latin poets often used the name Getae. Modern historians prefer to use the name Geto-Dacians. Strabo describes the Getae and Dacians as distinct but cognate tribes. This distinction refers to the regions they occupied. Strabo and Pliny the Elder also state that Getae and Dacians spoke the same language.

By contrast, the name of Dacians, whatever the origin of the name, was used by the more western tribes who adjoined the Pannonians and therefore first became known to the Romans. According to Strabo's Geographica, the original name of the Dacians was Δάοι "Daoi". The name Daoi (one of the ancient Geto-Dacian tribes) was certainly adopted by foreign observers to designate all the inhabitants of the countries north of Danube that had not yet been conquered by Greece or Rome.

The ethnographic name Daci is found under various forms within ancient sources. Greeks used the forms Δάκοι "Dakoi" (Strabo, Dio Cassius, and Dioscorides) and Δάοι "Daoi" (singular Daos). (Note: Dioscorides's book (known in English by its Latin title De Materia Medica ("Regarding Medical Materials")) has all the Dacian names of the plants preceded by Δάκοι Dakoi i.e. Δάκοι Dakoi προποδιλα Latin Daci propodila "Dacians propodila") The form Δάοι "Daoi" was frequently used according to Stephan of Byzantium. Latins used the forms Davus, Dacus, and a derived form Dacisci (Vopiscus and inscriptions).

There are similarities between the ethnonyms of the Dacians and those of Dahae (Greek Δάσαι Δάοι, Δάαι, Δαι, Δάσαι Dáoi, Dáai, Dai, Dasai; Latin Dahae, Daci), an Indo-European people located east of the Caspian Sea, until the 1st millennium BC. Scholars have suggested that there were links between the two peoples since ancient times. The historian David Gordon White has, moreover, stated that the "Dacians ... appear to be related to the Dahae".

By the end of the first century AD, all the inhabitants of the lands which now form Romania were known to the Romans as Daci, with the exception of some Celtic and Germanic tribes who infiltrated from the west, and Sarmatian and related people from the east.

=== Carpi and Costoboci ===
The Carpi were a sizeable group of tribes, who lived beyond the north-eastern boundary of Roman Dacia. The majority view among modern scholars is that the Carpi were a North Thracian tribe and a subgroup of the Dacians. However, some historians classify them as Slavs. According to Heather, the Carpi were Dacians from the eastern foothills of the Carpathian range – modern Moldavia and Wallachia – who had not been brought under direct Roman rule at the time of Trajan's conquest of Transylvania Dacia. After they generated a new degree of political unity among themselves in the course of the third century, these Dacian groups came to be known collectively as the Carpi.

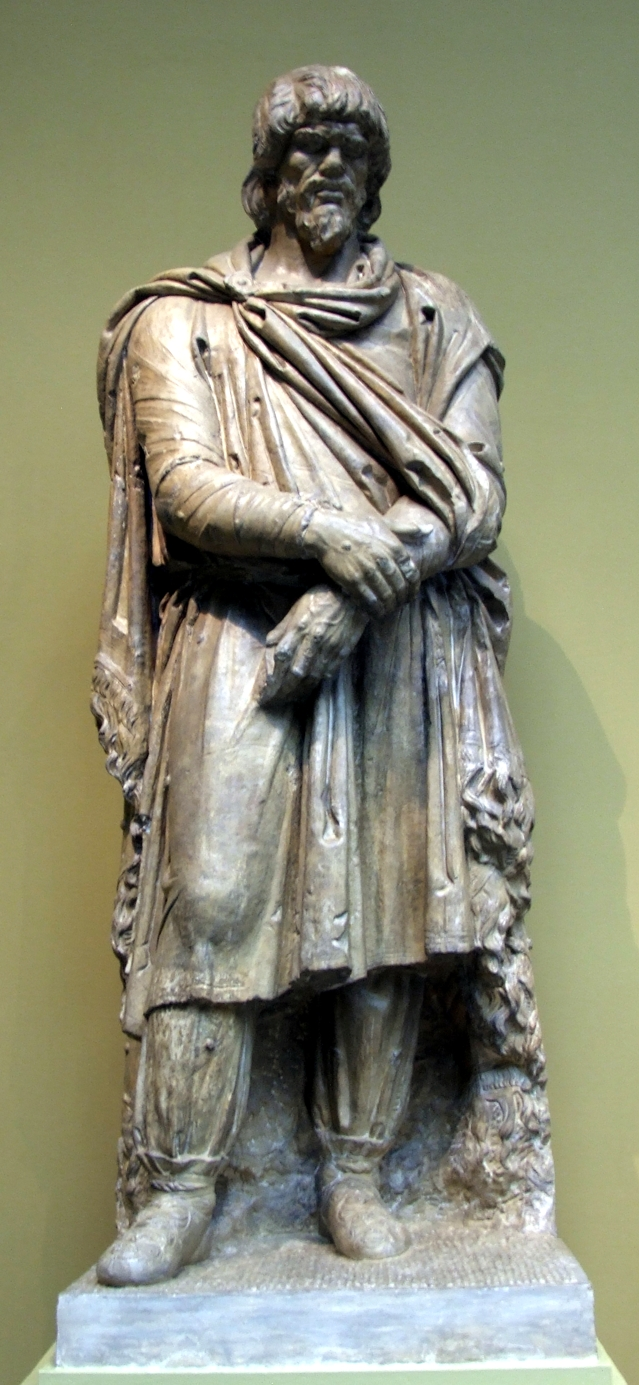
Dacian cast in Pushkin Museum, after original in Lateran Museum. Early second century AD.

The ancient sources about the Carpi, before 104 AD, located them on a territory situated between the western side of Eastern European Galicia and the mouth of the Danube. The name of the tribe is homonymous with the Carpathian mountains. Carpi and Carpathian are Dacian words derived from the root (s)ker- "cut" cf. Albanian karp "stone" and Sanskrit kar- "cut".A quote from the 6th-century Byzantine chronicler Zosimus referring to the Carpo-Dacians (Greek: Καρποδάκαι, Latin: Carpo-Dacae), who attacked the Romans in the late 4th century, is seen as evidence of their Dacian ethnicity. In fact, Carpi/Carpodaces is the term used for Dacians outside of Dacia proper. However, that the Carpi were Dacians is shown not so much by the form Καρποδάκαι in Zosimus as by their characteristic place-names in –dava, given by Ptolemy in their country. The origin and ethnic affiliations of the Carpi have been debated over the years; in modern times they are closely associated with the Carpathian Mountains, and a good case has been made for attributing to the Carpi a distinct material culture, "a developed form of the Geto-Dacian La Tene culture", often known as the Poienesti culture, which is characteristic of this area.

The main view is that the Costoboci were ethnically Dacian. Others considered them a Slavic or Sarmatian tribe. There was also a Celtic influence, so that some consider them a mixed Celtic and Thracian group that appear, after Trajan's conquest, as a Dacian group within the Celtic superstratum. The Costoboci inhabited the southern slopes of the Carpathians. Ptolemy named the Coestoboci (Costoboci in Roman sources) twice, showing them divided by the Dniester and the Peucinian (Carpathian) Mountains. This suggests that they lived on both sides of the Carpathians, but it is also possible that two accounts about the same people were combined. There was also a group, the Transmontani, that some modern scholars identify as Dacian Transmontani Costoboci of the extreme north. The name Transmontani was from the Dacians' Latin, literally "people over the mountains". Mullenhoff identified these with the Transiugitani, another Dacian tribe north of the Carpathian mountains.

Based on the account of Dio Cassius, Heather (2010) considers that Hasding Vandals, around 171 AD, attempted to take control of lands which previously belonged to the free Dacian group called the Costoboci. Hrushevskyi mentions that the earlier widespread view that these Carpathian tribes were Slavic has no basis. This would be contradicted by the Coestobocan names themselves that are known from the inscriptions, written by a Coestobocan and therefore presumably accurately. These names sound quite unlike anything Slavic. Scholars such as Tomaschek, Schütte and Russu consider these Costobocian names to be Thraco-Dacian.

=== Culture ===
Body-painting was customary among the Dacians. It is probable that the tattooing originally had a religious significance. They practiced symbolic-ritual tattooing or body painting for both men and women, with hereditary symbols transmitted up to the fourth generation.

Dacian religion was considered by the classic sources as a key source of authority, suggesting to some that Dacia was a predominantly theocratic state led by priest-kings. However, the layout of the Dacian capital Sarmizegethusa indicates the possibility of co-rulership, with a separate high king and high priest. Ancient sources recorded the names of several Dacian high priests (Deceneus, Comosicus and Vezina) and various orders of priests: "god-worshipers", "smoke-walkers" and "founders". Both Hellenistic and Oriental influences are discernible in the religious background, alongside chthonic and solar motifs. According to Herodotus' account of the story of Zalmoxis or Zamolxis, the Getae (speaking the same language as the Dacians and the Thracians, according to Strabo) believed in the immortality of the soul, and regarded death as merely a change of country. Their chief priest held a prominent position as the representative of the supreme deity, Zalmoxis, who is called also Gebeleizis by some among them. Strabo wrote about the high priest of King Burebista Deceneus: "a man who not only had wandered through Egypt, but also had thoroughly learned certain prognostics through which he would pretend to tell the divine will; and within a short time he was set up as god (as I said when relating the story of Zamolxis)".

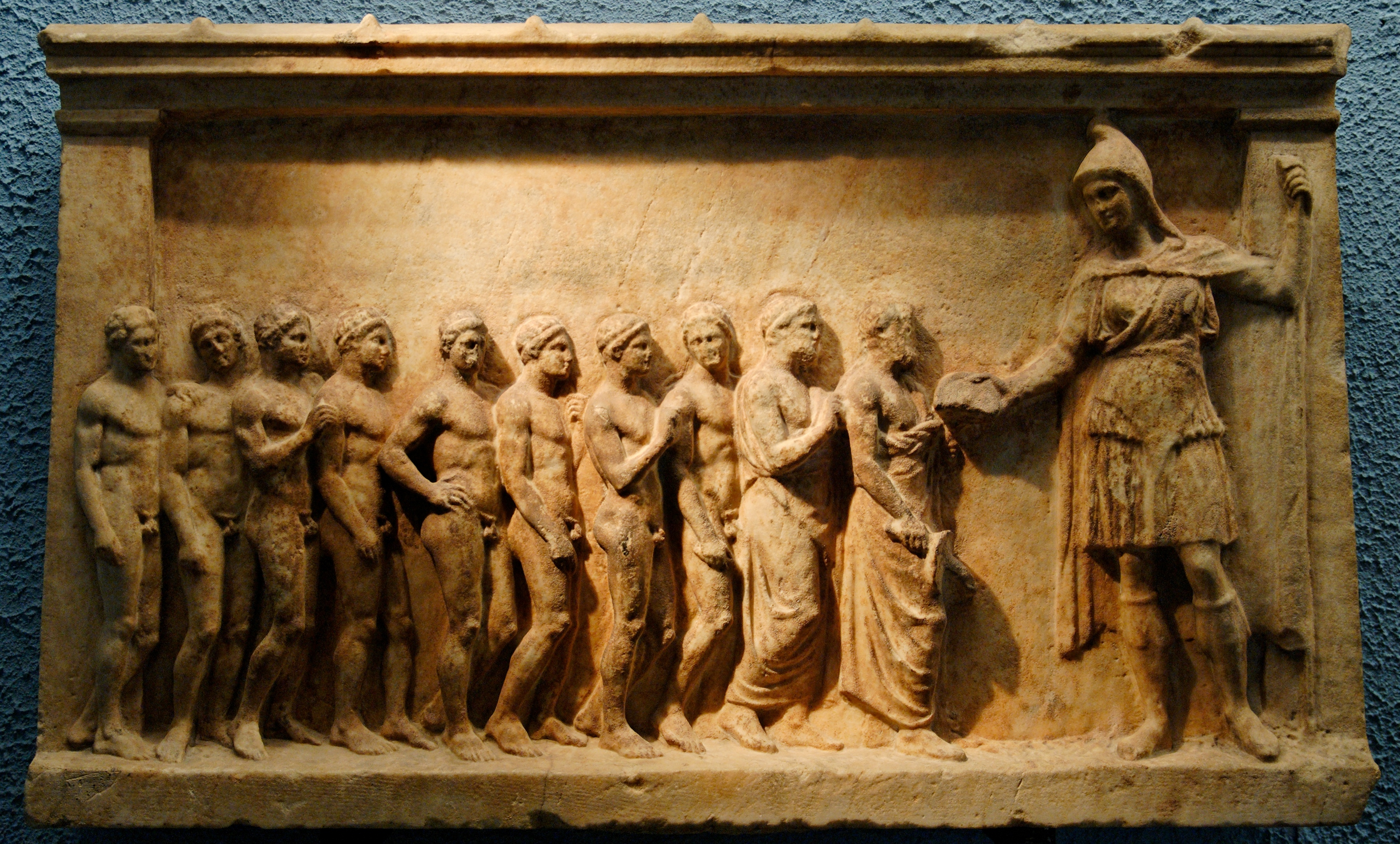
Votive stele representing Bendis wearing a Dacian cap at the British Museum in London

The Goth Jordanes in his Getica (The origin and deeds of the Goths), also gives an account of Deceneus the highest priest, and considered Dacians a nation related to the Goths. Besides Zalmoxis, the Dacians believed in other deities, such as Gebeleizis, the god of storm and lightning, possibly related to the Thracian god Zibelthiurdos. Another important deity was Bendis, goddess of the moon and the hunt. By a decree of the oracle of Dodona, which required the Athenians to grant land for a shrine or temple, her cult was introduced into Attica by immigrant Thracian residents, (Note: Extensive discussion of whether the date is 429 or 413 BC was reviewed and newly analyzed in Christopher Planeaux, "The Date of Bendis' Entry into Attica" The Classical Journal 96.2 (December 2000:165–192). Planeaux offers a reconstruction of the inscription mentioning the first introduction, p) and, though Thracian and Athenian processions remained separate, both cult and festival became so popular that in Plato's time (c. 429–13 BC) its festivities were naturalized as an official ceremony of the Athenian city-state, called the Bendideia. (Note: Fifth-century fragmentary inscriptions that record formal descrees regarding formal aspects of the Bendis cult, are reproduced in Planeaux 2000:170f)

== Early Middle Ages ==
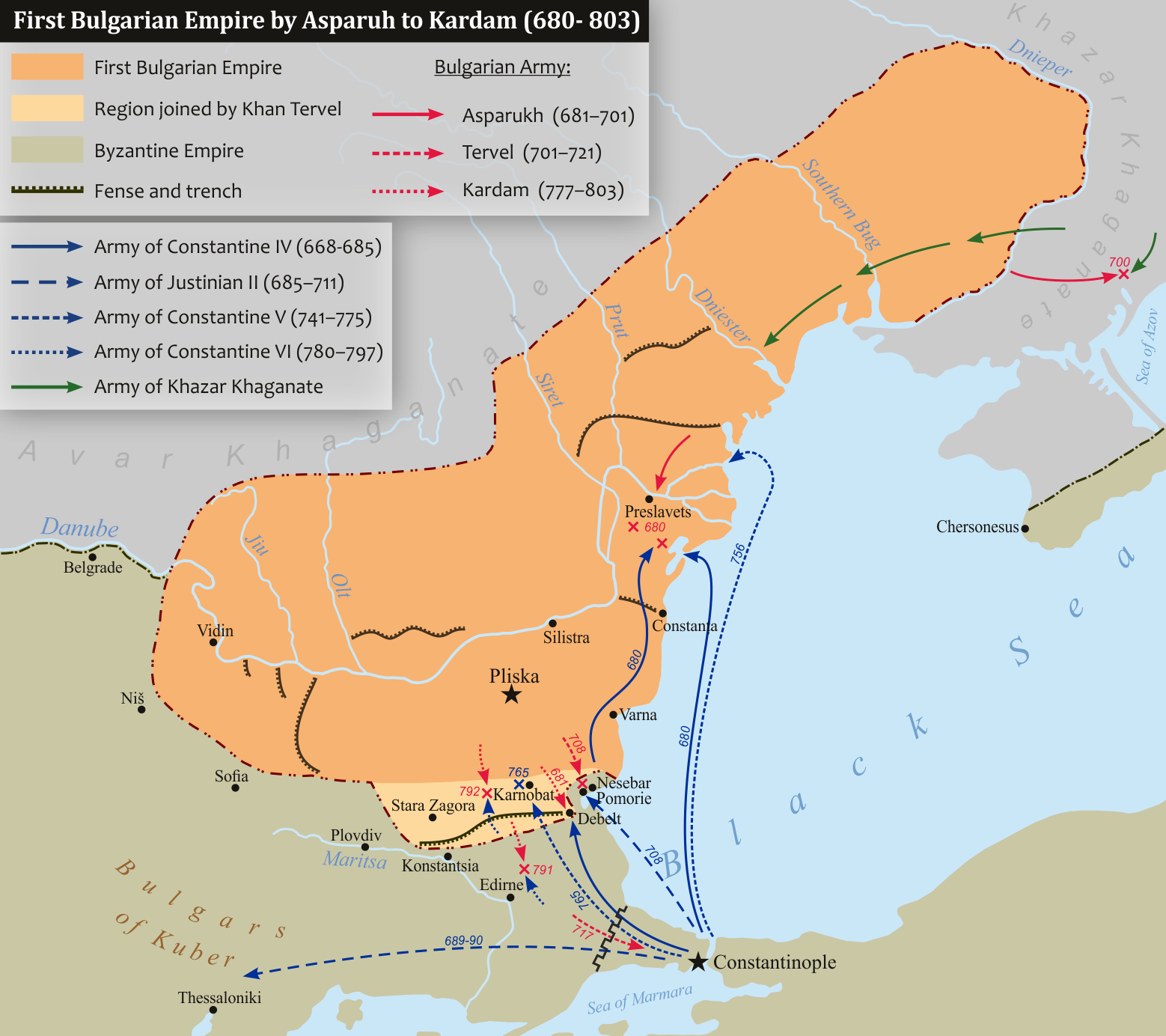
The foundation of the First Bulgarian Empire

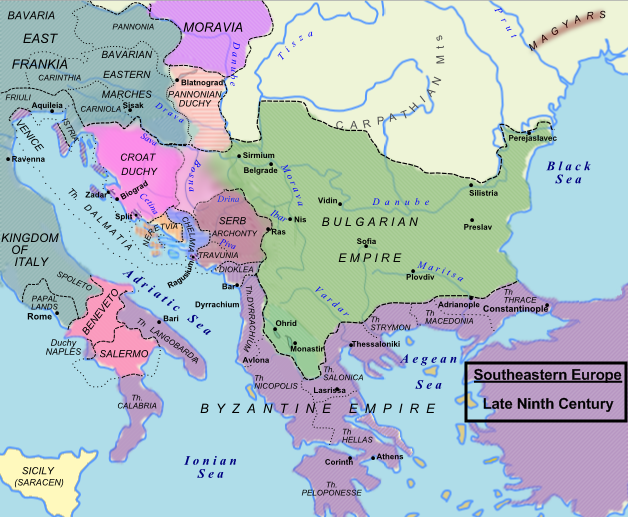
First Bulgarian Empire

Between 271 and 275, the Roman army and administration left Dacia, which was invaded later by the Goths. The Goths mixed with the local people until the 4th century, when the Huns, a nomadic people, arrived. The Gepids, the Avars, the Bulgars and their Slavic subjects ruled Transylvania until the 8th century. The territories of Wallachia and Moldavia were under the control of the First Bulgarian Empire from its establishment in 681 until around the time of the Hungarian conquest of Transylvania at the end of the 10th century.

After the disintegration of Great Bulgaria following Khan Kubrat's death in 665, a large group of Bulgars followed Asparukh, the third son of the great Khan, who headed westwards. In the 670's they settled in the area known as the Ongal to the north of the Danube Delta. From there, Asparukh's cavalry in alliance with local Slavs annually attacked the Byzantine territories in the south. In 680, the Byzantine Emperor Constantine IV led a large army to fight the Bulgars but was defeated in the battle of Ongal and the Byzantines were forced to acknowledge the formation of a new country, the First Bulgarian Empire. The northern border of the country followed the southern slopes of the Carpathian mountains from the Iron Gates and reached the Dneper river or possibly just the Dniester river to the east.

The Bulgarians' main rivals in the area were the Avars to the west and the Khazars to the east. The Khazars were a serious threat; they marched westwards after they crushed the resistance of Kubrat's eldest son Bayan and waged a war against Asparukh, who was killed, although not necessarily by a Khazar. To protect their northern borders, the Bulgarians built several enormous ditches that ran the whole length of the border from the Timok river to the Black Sea.

In 803, Krum of Bulgaria became Khan. The new, energetic ruler focused on the north-west where Bulgaria's old enemies the Avars experienced difficulties and setbacks against the Franks under Charlemagne. Between 804 and 806, the Bulgarian armies annihilated the Avars and destroyed their state. Krum took the eastern parts of the former Avar Khaganate and took over rule of the local Slavic tribes. Bulgaria's territory extended twice from the middle Danube to the north of present-day Budapest to the Dnester, though its possession of Transylvania is debatable. In 813 Khan Krum seized Odrin and plundered the whole of Eastern Thrace. He took 50,000 captives who were settled in Bulgaria across the Danube.

== High Middle Ages ==
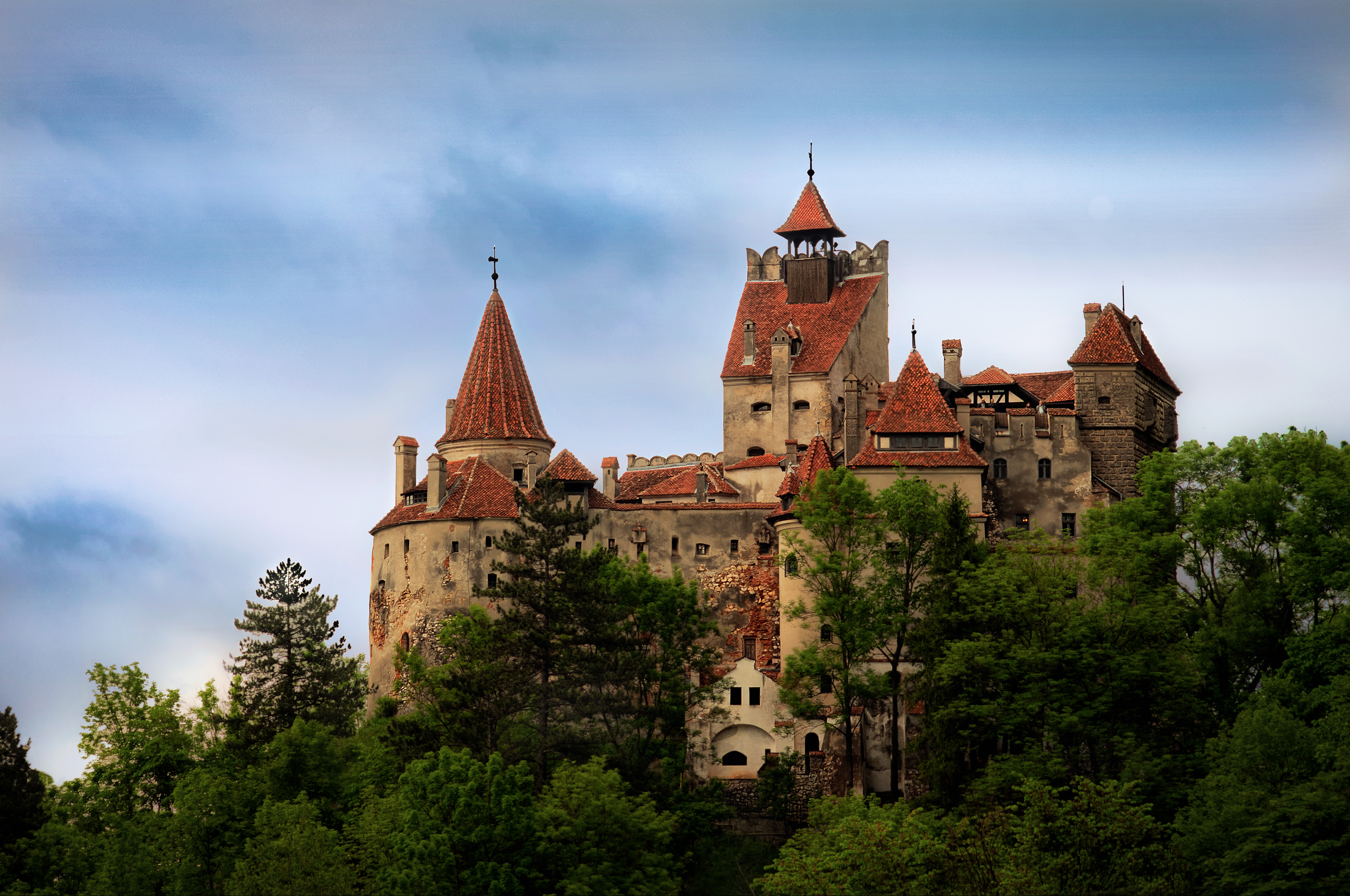
Bran Castle (German: Törzburg, Hungarian: Törcsvár) built in 1377, is commonly known as Dracula's Castle and is situated in the center of present-day Romania. In addition to its unique architecture, the castle is famous because of persistent myths that it was once the home of Vlad III Dracula.

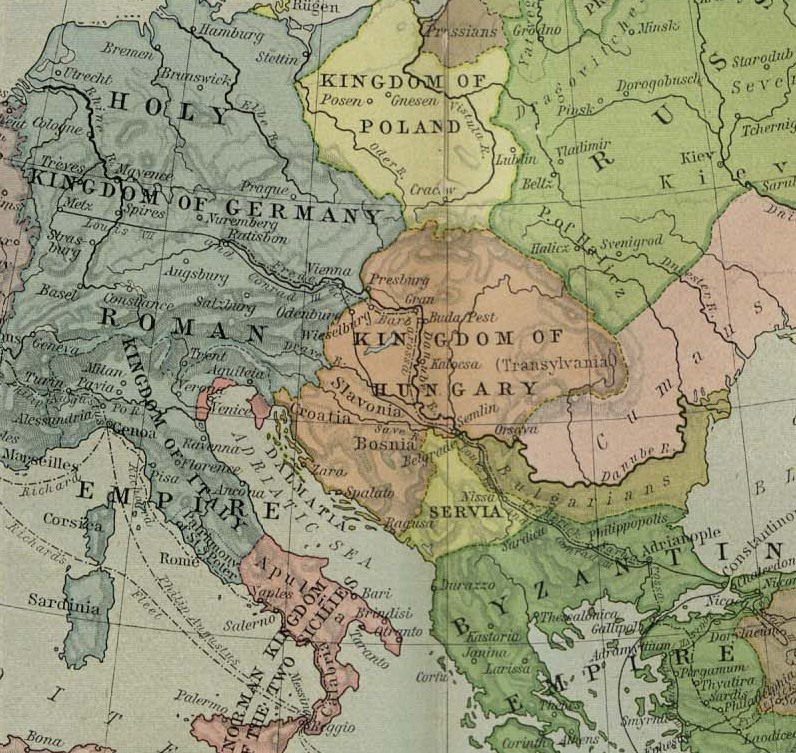
Europe in 1190

During the Middle Ages the Bulgarian Empire controlled vast areas to the north of the river Danube (with interruptions) from its establishment in 681 to its fragmentation in 1371–1422. These lands were called by contemporary Byzantine historians Bulgaria across the Danube, or Transdanubian Bulgaria. Original information for the centuries-old Bulgarian rule there is scarce as the archives of the Bulgarian rulers were destroyed and little is mentioned for this area in Byzantine or Hungarian manuscripts. During the First Bulgarian Empire, the Dridu culture developed in the beginning of the 8th century and flourished until the 11th century. It represents an early medieval archaeological culture which emerged in the region of the Lower Danube. In Bulgaria it is usually referred to as Pliska-Preslav culture.

The Pechenegs, the Cumans and Uzes are also mentioned by historic chronicles on the territory of Romania until the founding of the Romanian principalities of Wallachia in the south by Basarab I around 1310 in the High Middle Ages, and Moldavia in the east, by Dragoș around 1352.

The Pechenegs, a semi-nomadic Turkic people of the Central Asian steppes, occupied the steppes north of the Black Sea from the 8th to the 11th centuries, and by the 10th century they were in control of all of the territory between the Don and the lower Danube rivers. During the 11th and 12th centuries, the nomadic confederacy of the Cumans and Eastern Kipchaks dominated the territories between present-day Kazakhstan, southern Russia, Ukraine, southern Moldavia and western Wallachia.

It is debated whether elements of the mixed Daco–Roman population survived in Transylvania through the Dark Ages to become the ancestors of modern Romanians or whether the first Vlachs and Romanians appeared in the area in the 13th century after a northward migration from the Balkan Peninsula. There is also debate over the ethnicity of Transylvania's population before the Hungarian conquest.

Several Kings of Hungary invited settlers from Central and Western Europe, such as the Saxons, to occupy Transylvania. The Székelys were brought to southeastern Transylvania as border guards. Romanians are mentioned by the Hungarian documents of a township called Olahteluk in 1283 in Bihar County. The "land of Romanians" (Terram Blacorum, Blacs are not equal to romanians.) appeared in Făgăraș and this area was mentioned under the name "Olachi" in 1285.

King Louis I of Hungary dispatched Andrew Lackfi, Count of the Székelys to invade the lands of the Golden Horde in retaliation for the Tatars's earlier plundering raids against Transylvania. Lackfi and his army of mainly Székely warriors inflicted a defeat on a large Tatar army on 2 February 1345. The campaign had finally expelled the Tatars and ended the devastations of the Mongols in Transylvania. The Golden Horde was pushed back behind the Dniester River, thereafter the Golden Horde's control of the lands between the Eastern Carpathians and the Black Sea weakened. Moldavia was founded in 1346.

Independent Wallachia had been near the border of the Ottoman Empire since the 14th century until it had gradually succumbed to the Ottomans' influence during the next centuries with brief periods of independence. Vlad III the Impaler was a Prince of Wallachia in 1448, 1456–62, and 1476. Vlad III is remembered for his raids against the Ottoman Empire and his initial success of keeping his small country free for a short time. In the Western world, Vlad is best known for being the inspiration for the main character in Bram Stoker's 1897 novel Dracula. The Romanian historiography evaluates him as a ferocious but just ruler, and the defender of the Wallachian independence and of the European Christianity against Ottoman expansionism.

Stephen the Great (Romanian: Ștefan cel Mare) is thought to be the best voivode of Moldavia. Stephen ruled for 47 years, an unusually long period for that time. He was a successful military leader and statesman, losing only two out of fifty battles; he built a shrine to commemorate each victory, founding 48 churches and monasteries, many of which have a unique architectural style and are listed in UNESCO's list of World Heritage Sites. Stefan's most prestigious victory was over the Ottoman Empire in 1475 at the Battle of Vaslui, for which he raised the Voroneț Monastery. For this victory, Pope Sixtus IV nominated him as verus christianae fidei athleta (a true Champion of the Christian Faith). After Stephen's death, Moldavia also came under the suzerainty of the Ottoman Empire during the 16th century.

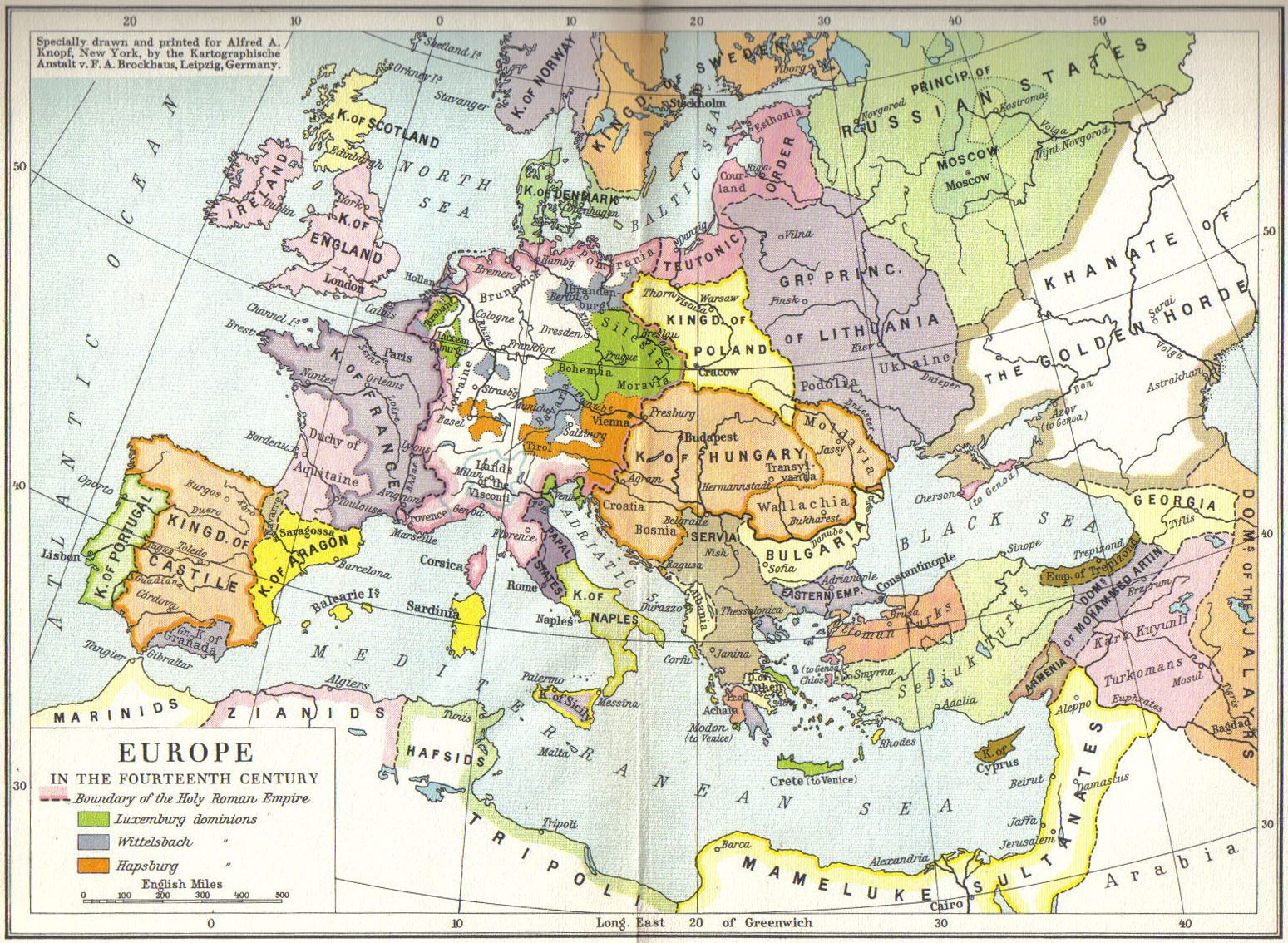
Europe in 14th century

Although the core religious vocabulary of the Romanian language originated from Latin, many terms were adopted from the Slavic Orthodoxy, showing a significant influence dating from the Bulgarian Empire (681–1396).

== Early modern period ==
=== Ottoman Romania ===
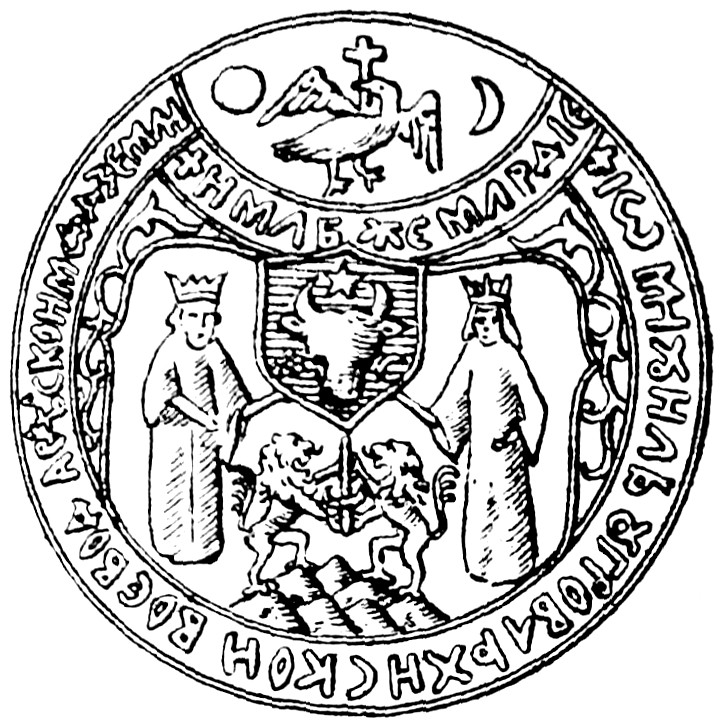
Seal of Michael the Brave during the personal union of the two Romanian principalities with Transylvania

After the Battle of Mohács in 1526, Transylvania belonged to the Eastern Hungarian Kingdom, from which the Principality of Transylvania emerged in 1570 by the Treaty of Speyer.

By 1541, the entire Balkan peninsula and the southern and central parts of Hungary became Ottoman provinces. Moldavia, Wallachia, and Transylvania came under Ottoman suzerainty but remained fully autonomous and until the 18th century, had some internal independence. However, regions of Banat, Dobrogea and Crișana alongside cities of Giurgiu, Turnu and Braila were completely under Ottoman control. Unlike the autonomous Moldavia, Wallachia and Transylvania, many Muslims settled in those areas. During this period, the Romanian lands experienced a slow disappearance of the feudalism and the distinguishing of some rulers like Vasile Lupu and Dimitrie Cantemir in Moldavia, Matei Basarab and Constantin Brâncoveanu in Wallachia. At that time, the Russian Empire appeared to become the political and military power the threatened the Romanian principalities.

John II, the non-Habsburg King of Hungary, moved his royal court to Alba Iulia in Transylvania and after his abdication from the Hungarian throne, he became the first Prince of Transylvania. His 1568 Edict of Turda enshrined freedom of conscience and religion and the free choice of clergy for congregations. In the aftermath, Transylvania was ruled by mostly Calvinist Hungarian princes until the end of the 17th century, and Protestantism flourished in the region.

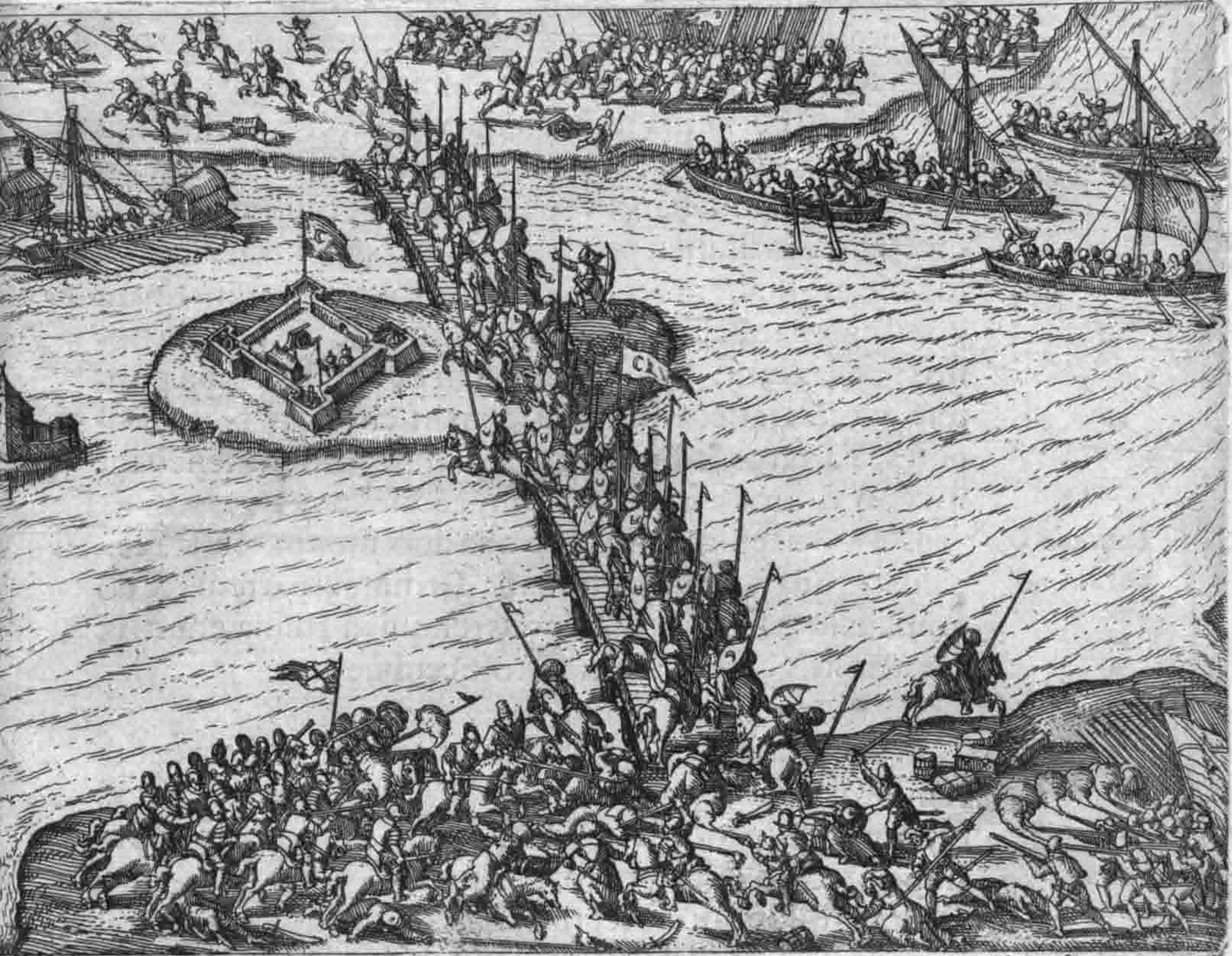
Battle of Giurgiu which ended with the victory of the united forces of Transylvania, Wallachia and Moldavia over the retreating Ottoman army

Michael the Brave was the Prince of Wallachia from 1593 to 1601, of Transylvania from 1599 to 1600, and of Moldavia in 1600. For a short time during his reign, Transylvania was ruled together with Moldavia and Wallachia in a personal union. After his death the union dissolved and as vassal tributary states, Moldavia and Wallachia still had internal autonomy and some external independence, which was finally lost in the 18th century.

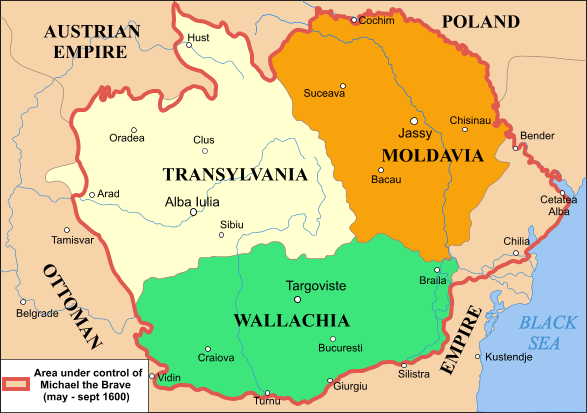
Principality of Wallachia, Principality of Moldavia, and Principality of Transylvania in personal union of Michael the Brave in 1600

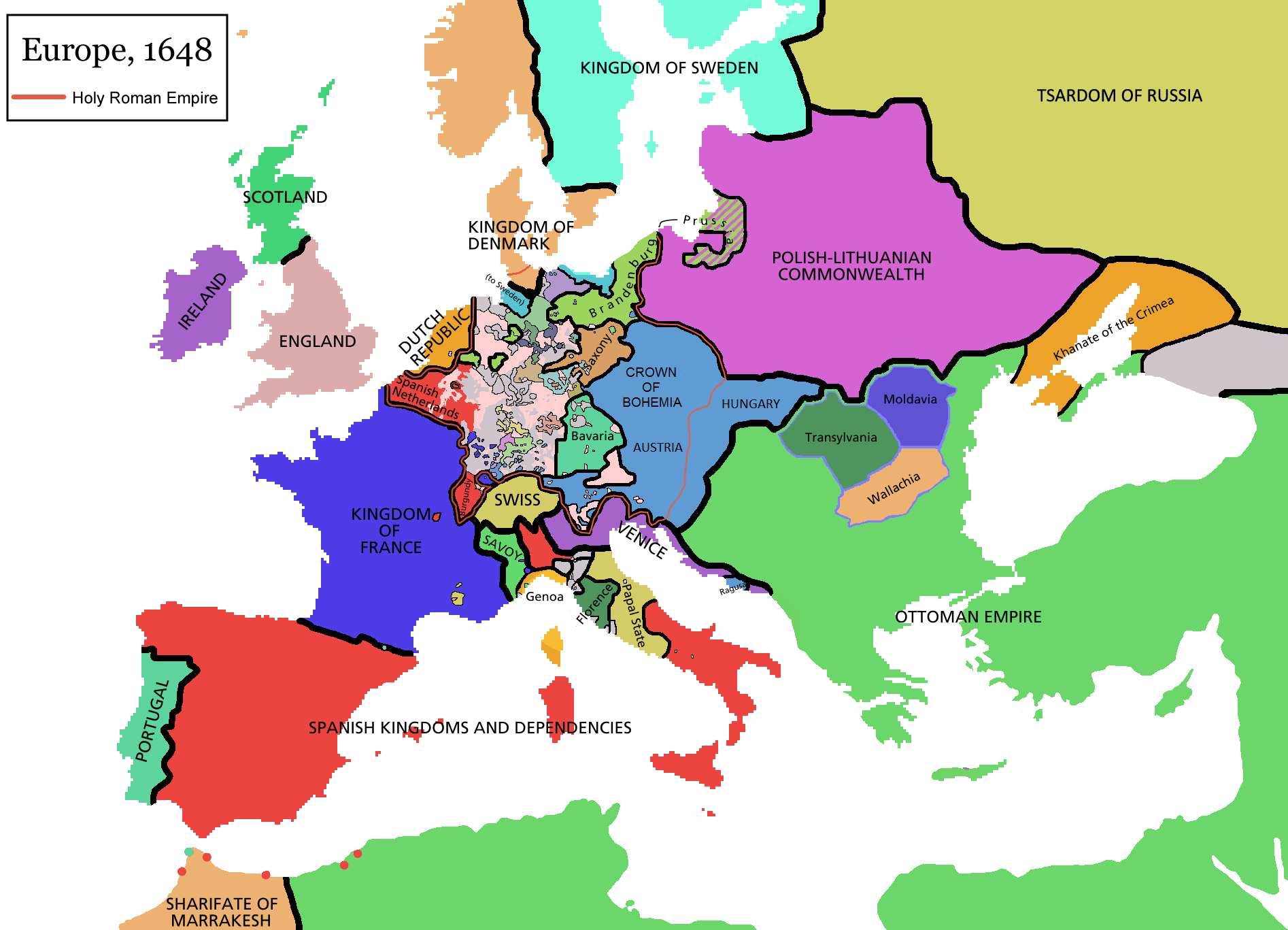
Map of Europe in 1648 showing Transylvania and the two Romanian principalities: Wallachia and Moldavia

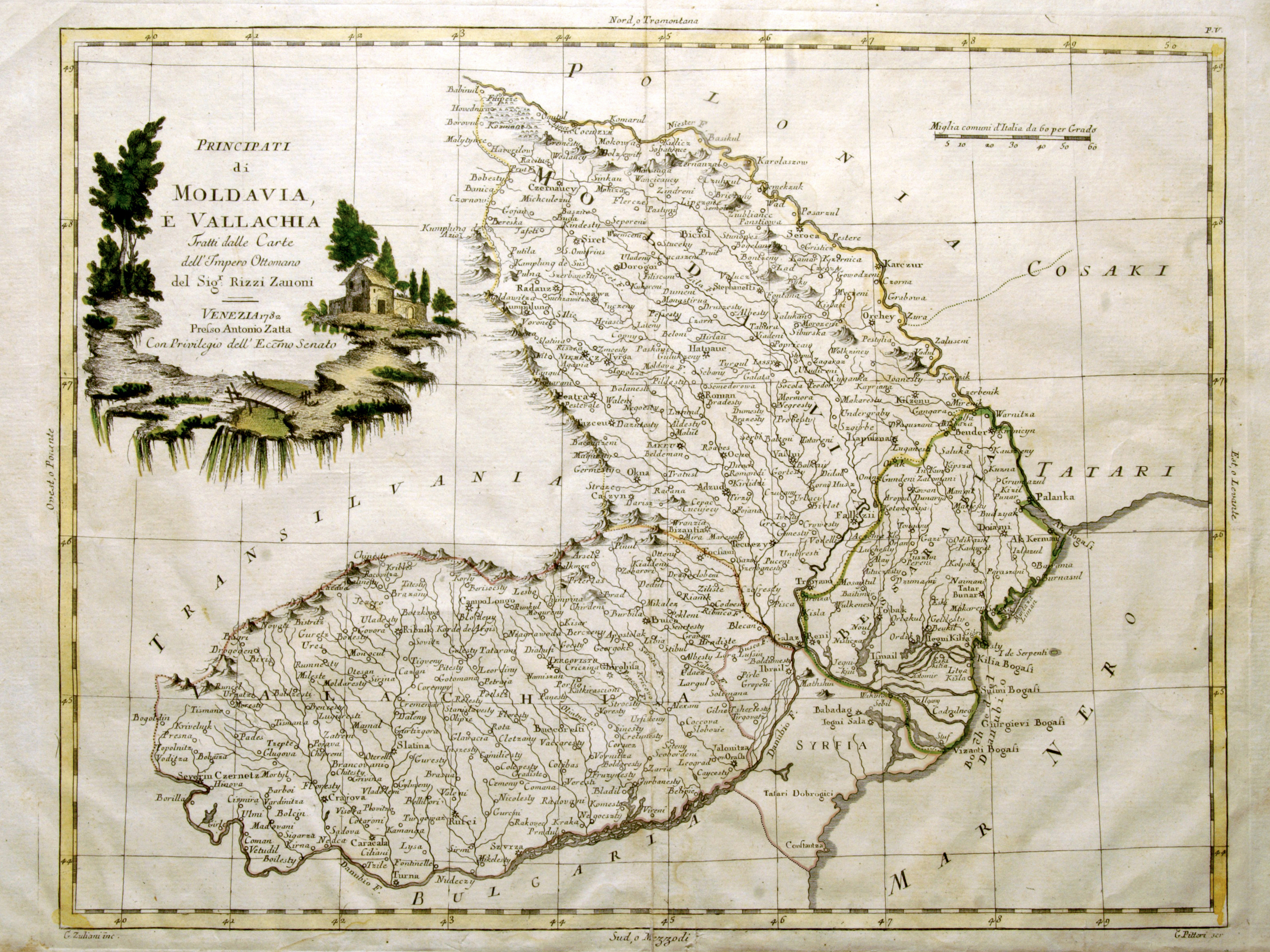
The Principalities of Moldavia and Wallachia in 1786, Italian map by G. Pittori, since the geographer Giovanni Antonio Rizzi Zannoni

The Principality of Transylvania reached its golden age under the absolutist rule of Gábor Bethlen from 1613 to 1629. In 1690, the Habsburg monarchy gained possession of Transylvania through the Hungarian crown. After the failure Rákóczi's War of Independence in 1711 Habsburg control of Transylvania was consolidated, and Hungarian Transylvanian princes were replaced with Habsburg imperial governors. In 1699, Transylvania became a part of the Habsburg monarchy following the Austrian victory over the Turks. The Habsburgs rapidly expanded their empire; in 1718 Oltenia, a major part of Wallachia, was annexed to the Habsburg monarchy and was only returned in 1739. In 1775, the Habsburgs later occupied the north-western part of Moldavia, which was later called Bukovina and was incorporated to the Austrian Empire in 1804. The eastern half of the principality, which was called Bessarabia, was occupied in 1812 by Russia.

During the Austro-Hungarian rule of Transylvania, Romanians formed the majority of the population.

After their defeat to the Russians, the Ottoman Empire restored the Danube ports of Turnu, Giurgiu and Braila to Wallachia, and agreed to give up their commercial monopoly and recognize freedom of navigation on the Danube as specified in the Treaty of Adrianople, which was signed in 1829. The political autonomy of the Romanian principalities grew as their rulers were elected for life by a Community Assembly consisting of boyars, a method used to reduce political instability and Ottoman interventions. Following the war, Romanian lands came under Russian occupation under the governance of General Pavel Kiselyov until 1844. During his rule, the local boyars enacted the first Romanian constitution.

=== Revolutions of 1848 and formation of modern Romania ===
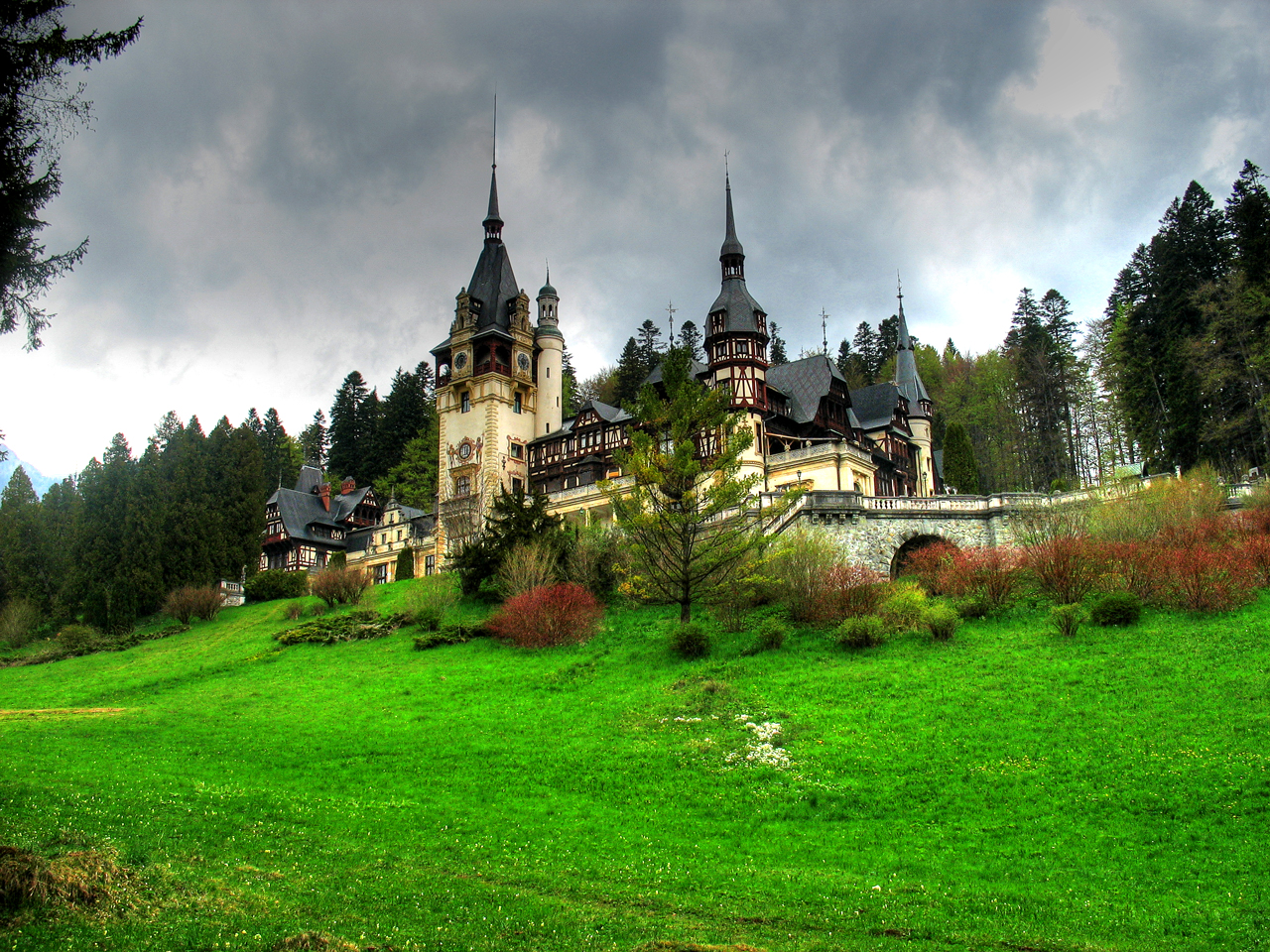
Peleș Castle, retreat of Romanian monarchs

In 1848, there was a revolution in Moldavia, Wallachia and Transylvania perpetrated by Tudor Vladimirescu and his Pandurs in the Wallachian uprising of 1821. The goals of the revolutionaries were full independence for Moldavia and Wallachia, and national emancipation in Transylvania; these were not fulfilled but were the basis of the subsequent revolutions. The revolution in 1848 already carried the seeds of the national dream of a unified and united Romania, though the "idea of unification" had been known from earlier works of Naum Ramniceanu (1802) and Ion Budai-Deleanu (1804).

=== United Principalities of Moldavia and Wallachia ===
After the unsuccessful 1848 revolution, the Great Powers rejected the Romanians' desire to officially unite in a single state, forcing the Romanians to proceed alone in their struggle against the Turks.

The aftermath of the Russian Empire's defeat in the Crimean War brought the 1856 Treaty of Paris, which started a period of common tutelage for the Ottomans and a Congress of Great Powers—the United Kingdom of Great Britain and Ireland, the Second French Empire, the Kingdom of Piedmont-Sardinia, the Austrian Empire, Prussia, and, though never again fully, Russia. While the Moldavia-Wallachia unionist campaign, which had come to dominate political demands, was accepted with sympathy by the French, Russians, Prussians, and Sardinians, it was rejected by the Austrian Empire, and looked upon with suspicion by Great Britain and the Ottomans.

Negotiations amounted to an agreement on a minimal formal union, to be known as the United Principalities of Moldavia and Wallachia but with separate institutions and thrones and with each principality electing its own prince. However, the Moldavian and Wallachian elections for the ad-hoc divans in 1859 profited from an ambiguity in the text of the final agreement, which, while specifying two separate thrones, did not prevent the same person from occupying both thrones simultaneously and ultimately ushered in the ruling of Alexandru Ioan Cuza as Domnitor (Ruling Prince) over both Moldavia and Wallachia from 1859 onwards, uniting both principalities.

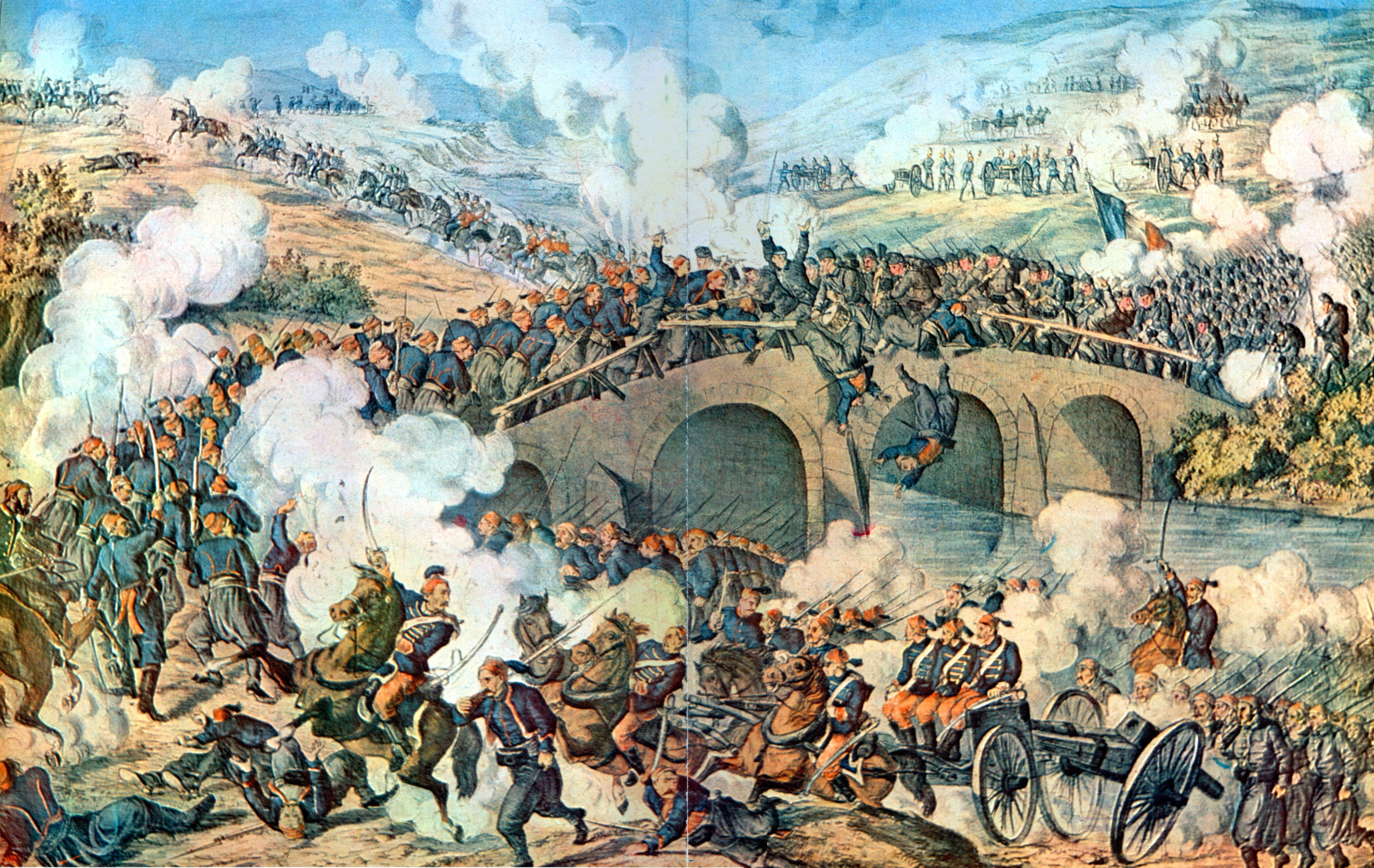
Clash between Romanians and Turks during the Romanian War of Independence, November 1877

Alexander Ioan Cuza carried out reforms including abolishing serfdom and started to unite the institutions one by one in spite of the convention from Paris. With help from unionists, he unified the government and parliament, effectively merging Wallachia and Moldavia into one country and in 1862 the country's name was changed to United Principalities of Romania.

Romania was created as a personal union that did not include Transylvania, where the upper class and the aristocracy remained mainly Hungarian, although Romanian nationalism clashed with Hungarian nationalism at the end of the 19th century. Austria-Hungary, especially under the Dual Monarchy of 1867, kept the territory firmly in control even in parts of Transylvania where Romanians constituted a vast majority.

== Independence and Kingdom of Romania ==
Timeline of the borders of Romania between 1859 and 2010

In an 1866 coup d'état, Cuza was exiled and replaced with Prince Karl of Hohenzollern-Sigmaringen. He was appointed Domnitor, Ruling Prince of the United Principality of Romania, as Prince Carol of Romania. Romania declared its independence from the Ottoman Empire after the Russo-Turkish War (1877–1878), in which the Ottomans fought against the Russian empire. In the 1878 Treaty of Berlin, Romania was officially recognized as an independent state by the Great Powers. In return, Romania ceded the district Bessarabia to Russia in exchange for access to the Black Sea ports and acquired Dobruja. In 1881, Romania's principality status was raised to that of a kingdom and on 26 March that year, Prince Carol became King Carol I of Romania.

The period between 1878 and 1914 was one of stability and progress for Romania. During the Second Balkan War, Romania joined Greece, Serbia and Montenegro against Bulgaria. In the Treaty of Bucharest of 1913, Romania gained Southern Dobruja and established the Durostor and Caliacra counties.

The governments of Britain and the United States repeatedly protested the brutal treatment of Romanian Jews, who were regarded as aliens who had no civil or political rights. Romania engaged in arbitrary expulsions of Jews as vagabonds and tolerated violent pogroms against Jews, many of whom fled to the United States.

== World War I ==
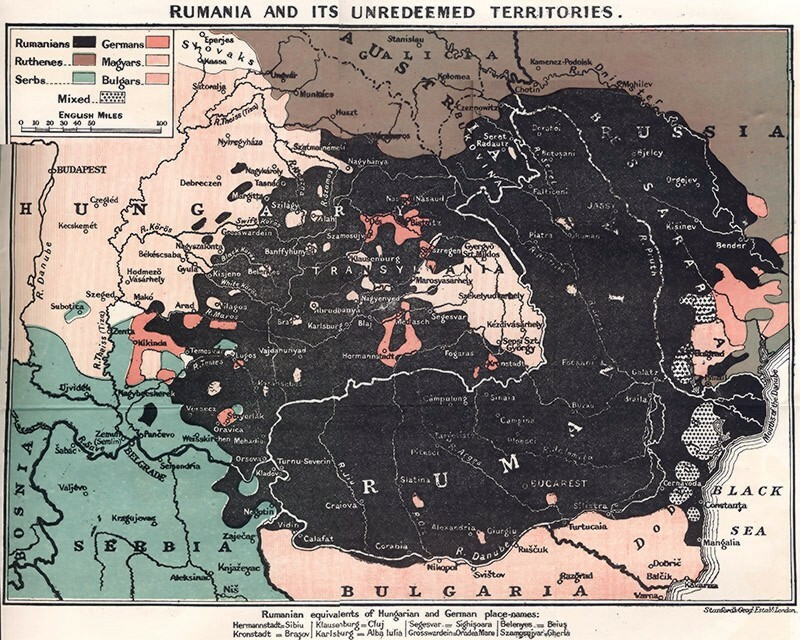
Territories inhabited by Romanians before WWI

Due to Romania's unfavorable location between the Russian Empire and Kingdom of Bulgaria as well as King Carol I of Romania's German heritage, Romania had a secret treaty of alliance with Germany and Austria-Hungary since 1883. When the war began in 1914, King Carol I summoned an emergency midnight council where he revealed the secret treaty of alliance. While the king favored Germany, the nation's political elite favored the Entente. As such, the crown council took the decision to remain neutral. When the Austro-Hungarian Empire invoked a casus foederis on Romania and Italy linked to the secret treaty of alliance since 1883, both Italy and Romania refused to honor the treaty on the grounds that the attacks on Austria were not "unprovoked", as stipulated in the treaty of alliance.

King Carol I died on 10 October 1914, and his successor, King Ferdinand I of Romania was much more favorable towards the Entente. In August 1916, Romania received an ultimatum to decide whether to join the Entente. The Romanian government agreed to enter the war on the side of the Entente, although the situation on the battle fronts was not favorable. For Romania, the highest priority was taking Transylvania from Hungary, with around 2,800,000 Romanians out of around 5,000,000 people. The Allies wanted Romania to join their side in order to cut rail communications between Germany and Turkey, and to cut off Germany's oil supplies. Britain made loans, France sent a military training mission, and Russia promised modern munitions. The Allies promised at least 200,000 soldiers to defend Romania against Bulgaria to the south, and help it invade Austria-Hungary.

On 4 August 1916, Romania and the Entente signed the Political Treaty and Military Convention, which established the parameters of Romania's participation in the war. The Allies promised to Romania the Austro-Hungarian regions of Bukovina, Transylvania up to Tisza river and all of Banat. Joining the Entente had large popular support. The Romanian campaign plan (Hypothesis Z) consisted in attacking Austria-Hungary in Transylvania, while defending Southern Dobruja and Giurgiu from Bulgaria in the south.

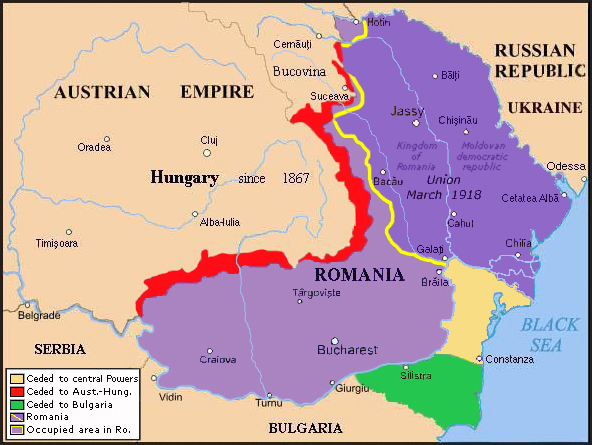
Romanian territorial losses in the Treaty of Bucharest in May 1918

The German high command was seriously worried about the prospect of Romania entering the war, Paul von Hindenburg writing:

It is certain that so relatively small a state as Rumania had never before been given a role so important, and, indeed, so decisive for the history of the world at so favorable a moment. Never before had two great Powers like Germany and Austria found themselves so much at the mercy of the military resources of a country which had scarcely one twentieth of the population of the two great states. Judging by the military situation, it was to be expected that Rumania had only to advance where she wished to decide the world war in favor of those Powers which had been hurling themselves at us in vain for years. Thus everything seemed to depend on whether Rumania was ready to make any sort of use of her momentary advantage.

On 27 August 1916, the Romanian Army launched an attack against Austria-Hungary, with limited Russian support. The Romanian offensive was initially successful and Romania managed to occupy 1/3rd of Transylvania, but when the German army arrived in Transylvania the Romanians began to be pushed back. Meanwhile on the southern front, a combined German-Bulgarian-Turkish offensive gradually occupied all of Dobruja and captured Giurgiu. The bulk of the Romanian army managed to escape encirclement from Giurgiu and retreated to Bucharest. As a result of the Battle of Bucharest, the Central Powers occupied the city on 6 December 1916.

In the summer of 1917, one of the largest concentrations of forces in World War I was present in Romania: 9 armies, 80 infantry divisions and 19 cavalry divisions, totaling 974 battalions, 550 squadrons and 923 artillery batteries. 800,000 combatants and 1,000,000 reservists were present.

In 1917, a new Central Powers offensive began, leading to the battles of Mărăști, Mărășești, and Oituz, where the Romanian army managed to defeat the Central Powers offensives and take back some territory in a counter-offensive. Romania lost over 27,000 men while Germany and Austria-Hungary lost over 60,000. Notably, the Romanian heroine Ecaterina Teodoroiu and German General Karl von Wenninger were killed at the end of the Battle of Mărășești. However, shortly after the military victories, the October Revolution threw the Russian Empire out of the war leaving Romania alone on the Eastern Front, completely surrounded by the Central Powers. This forced Romania to drop out of the war, and it signed the Treaty of Bucharest with the Central Powers in May 1918.

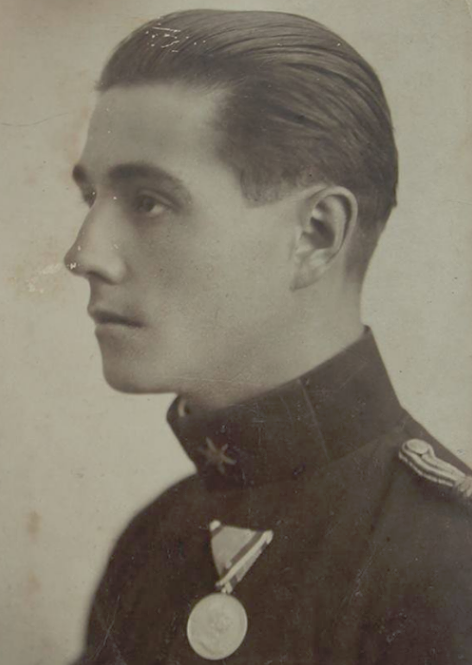
Military officer Emil Rebreanu (1891–1917), here wearing his Medal for Bravery, was among the Romanians executed during World War I by Austria-Hungary.

In 1939, General August von Mackensen would describe the Central Powers offensive from 1917 as following:

After fighting with the Rumanians in 1916, I thought the Rumanian army had disappeared, that it did not exist in 1917 when I had to make a new effort to conquer the rest of Rumania. But when the battles started in Mărășești, Mărăști, Oituz, I was told that in front of me was the Rumanian army that I was convinced had disappeared. But the Rumanian army has risen from its ashes like the Phoenix bird. The attacks on the bayonet scared everyone, and they were running, the Germans, who didn't usually run, this time they were running.

Under the terms of the Treaty of Bucharest, Romania would lose all of Dobruja to Bulgaria and a joint central power occupation, all the Carpathian mountain passes to Austria-Hungary, and would lease all of its oil reserves to Germany for 99 years. However, the Central Powers recognized Romania's union with Bessarabia who had recently declared independence from the Russian Empire following the October Revolution and voted for union with Romania in April 1918. The parliament signed the treaty, however King Ferdinand refused to sign it, hoping for an Allied victory on the western front. In October 1918, Romania renounced the treaty and on 10 November 1918, one day before the German armistice, Romania reentered the war after the successful Allied advances on the Macedonian front and advanced in Transylvania. The next day, the Treaty of Bucharest was nullified by the terms of the Armistice of Compiègne. Total Romanian deaths from 1914 to 1918, military and civilian, within contemporary borders, were estimated at 748,000.

=== Transylvanian, Bukovinian and Bessarabian Romanians ===
In Austria-Hungary, ethnic Romanians entered the war from the very beginning, with hundreds of thousands of Transylvanian and Bukovinian Romanians being mobilized throughout the war. Although most Transylvanian Romanians were loyal to the Austro-Hungarian Empire, over time, reactionary sentiments emerged, especially after Romania joined the war in 1916. Many of the previously loyal soldiers decided that it was much better to risk their lives through desertion, rather than shoot their ethnic conationals. According to studies made by the army of the Austro-Hungarian Empire, the dedication of the Romanian military to the interest of Austria-Hungary was reduced, only ethnic Italians of the same empire can compete with them for the last place in a ranking according to devotion to the state per 100 soldiers, out of about 300,000 Austro-Hungarian deserters, 150,000 were ethnic Romanians.

The Austro-Hungarian Romanian prisoners of war in the Russian Empire would eventually form the Romanian Volunteer Corps in Russia who would eventually be repatriated to Romania in 1917 and take part in the battles of Mărăști, Mărășești and Oituz and the Romanian Legion in Siberia who resisted the Bolsheviks in cooperation with the Czechoslovak Legion and the White movement during the Russian Civil War, these units were ultimately repatriated to Greater Romania in 1920. While the Austro-Hungarian Romanian prisoners of war in Italy would form the Romanian Volunteer Legion from Italy, which joined the fighting during the last battles on the Italian front and later, after the end of the war, participated in the Hungarian-Romanian War. Out of a total of 60,000 prisoners of war of Romanian origin, 37,000 Romanians requested to join the Romanian Legion in Italy. The ranks of the Austro-Hungarian soldiers enlisted in the Romanian Legion were equivalated to those corresponding of the Italian Royal Army. The sedentary part of the Romanian Legion, under the command of Colonel Camillo Ferraioli, was established at Albano Laziale, and the base camp in the Avezzano camp.

It is estimated that in the period 1914–1918 between 400,000 and 600,000 soldiers of Romanian origin fought on different fronts of Austria-Hungary, which represented a significant percentage of the Romanian ethnics who lived in those times in the Empire. In total, up to 150,000 Romanians were killed in action while fighting as part of the Austro-Hungarian Army.

== Greater Romania (1918–1940) ==
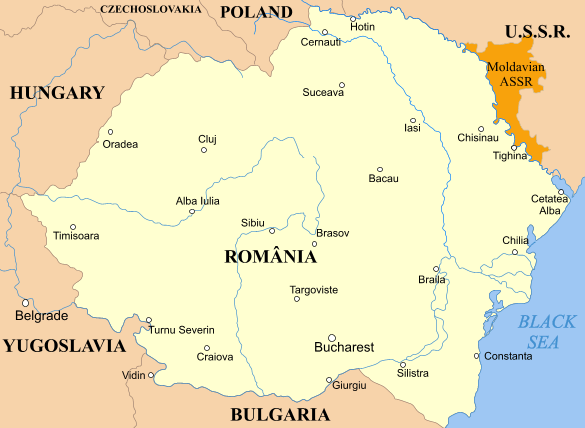
Great Romania (1920–1940)

Before World War I, the union of Michael the Brave, who ruled over the three principalities with Romanian population for 5 years (Wallachia, Transylvania and Moldavia), was viewed in later periods as the precursor of a modern Romania, a thesis which was argued with noted intensity by Nicolae Bălcescu. This theory became a point of reference for nationalists, as well as a catalyst for various Romanian forces to achieve a single Romanian state. World War I played a crucial part in the development of Romanian national consciousness.

In 1918, the union of Romania with Bukovina was ratified in 1919 in the Treaty of Saint Germain, and some of the Allies recognized the union with Bessarabia in 1920 through the never ratified Treaty of Paris. On 1 December, the Deputies of the Romanians from Transylvania voted to unite Transylvania, Banat, Crișana and Maramureș with Romania by the Proclamation of Union of Alba Iulia. Romanians today celebrate this as the Great Union Day, that is a national holiday.

The Romanian expression România Mare (Great or Greater Romania) refers to the Romanian state in the interwar period and to the territory Romania covered at the time. At that time, Romania achieved its greatest territorial extent, almost 300,000 km^{2} or 120,000 sq mi), including all of the historic Romanian lands.

Most of the claimed territories were granted to the Old Kingdom of Romania, which was ratified in 1920 by the Treaty of Trianon that defined the new border between Hungary and Romania. The union of Bucovina and Bessarabia with Romania was ratified in 1920 by the Treaty of Versailles. Romania also acquired Southern Dobruja territory called "The Quadrilateral" from Bulgaria as a result of its participation in the Second Balkan War in 1913.

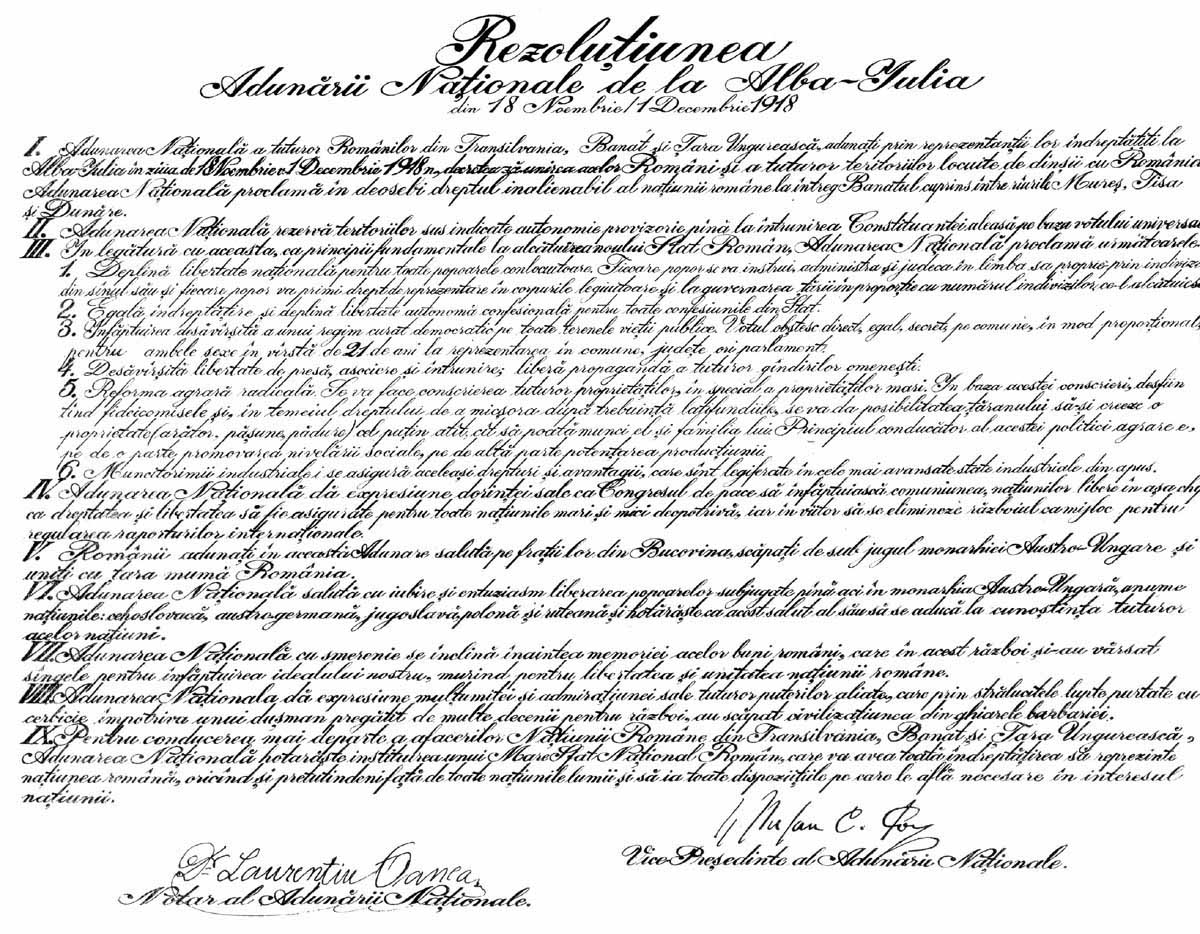
Proclamation of Union between Transylvania and Romania

As a result of the peace treaties, most regions with clear Romanian majorities were merged into a single state. It also led to the inclusion of sizable minorities. National minorities were recognized by the 1923 Constitution of Romania; they were represented in Parliament and several of them created political parties, although a unique standing of minorities with autonomy on a wide basis, provided for at the Great National Assembly of Alba Iulia on 1 December 1918, was not fulfilled. According to the 1930 Romanian Census, Romania had a population of 18,057,028. Romanians made up 71.9% of the population and 28.1% of the population were ethnic minorities. This occasionally led to violent conflict, as exemplified by the Hungarian–Romanian War and the Tatarbunary Uprising. To contain Hungarian irredentism, Romania, Yugoslavia and Czechoslovakia established the Little Entente in 1921. That same year Romania and Poland concluded a defensive alliance against the emergent Soviet Union, and in 1934 the Balkan Entente was formed with Yugoslavia, Greece and Turkey, which were suspicious of Bulgaria. Until 1938, Romania's governments maintained the form, if not always the substance, of a liberal constitutional monarchy. The National Liberal Party, dominant in the years immediately after World War I, became increasingly clientelist and nationalist, and in 1927 was supplanted in power by the National Peasants' Party. Between 1930 and 1940 there were over 25 separate governments; on several occasions in the last few years before World War II, the rivalry between the fascist Iron Guard and other political groupings approached the level of a civil war.

Upon the death of King Ferdinand in 1927, his son, Prince Carol, was prevented from succeeding him because of previous marital scandals that had resulted in his renunciation of rights to the throne. After living three years in exile, with his brother Nicolae serving as regent and his young son Michael as king, Carol changed his mind and with the support of the ruling National Peasants' Party he returned and proclaimed himself king.

Iuliu Maniu, leader of the National Peasants' Party, engineered Carol's return on the basis of a promise that he would forsake his mistress Magda Lupescu, and Lupescu herself had agreed to the arrangement. However, it became clear upon Carol's first re-encounter with his former wife, Elena, that he had no interest in a reconciliation with her, and Carol soon arranged for Magda Lupescu's return to his side. Her unpopularity was to be a millstone around Carol's neck for the rest of his reign. Maniu and his National Peasant Party shared the same general political aims of the Iron Guard: both fought against the corruption and dictatorial policies of King Carol II and the National Liberal Party.

The worldwide Great Depression that started in 1929 and was also present in Romania destabilized the country. The early 1930s were marked by social unrest, high unemployment, and strikes. In several instances, the Romanian government violently repressed strikes and riots, notably the 1929 miners' strike in Valea Jiului and the strike in the Grivița railroad workshops. In the mid-1930s, the Romanian economy recovered and the industry grew significantly, although about 80% of Romanians were still employed in agriculture. French economic and political influence was predominant in the early 1920s but then Germany became more dominant, especially in the 1930s.

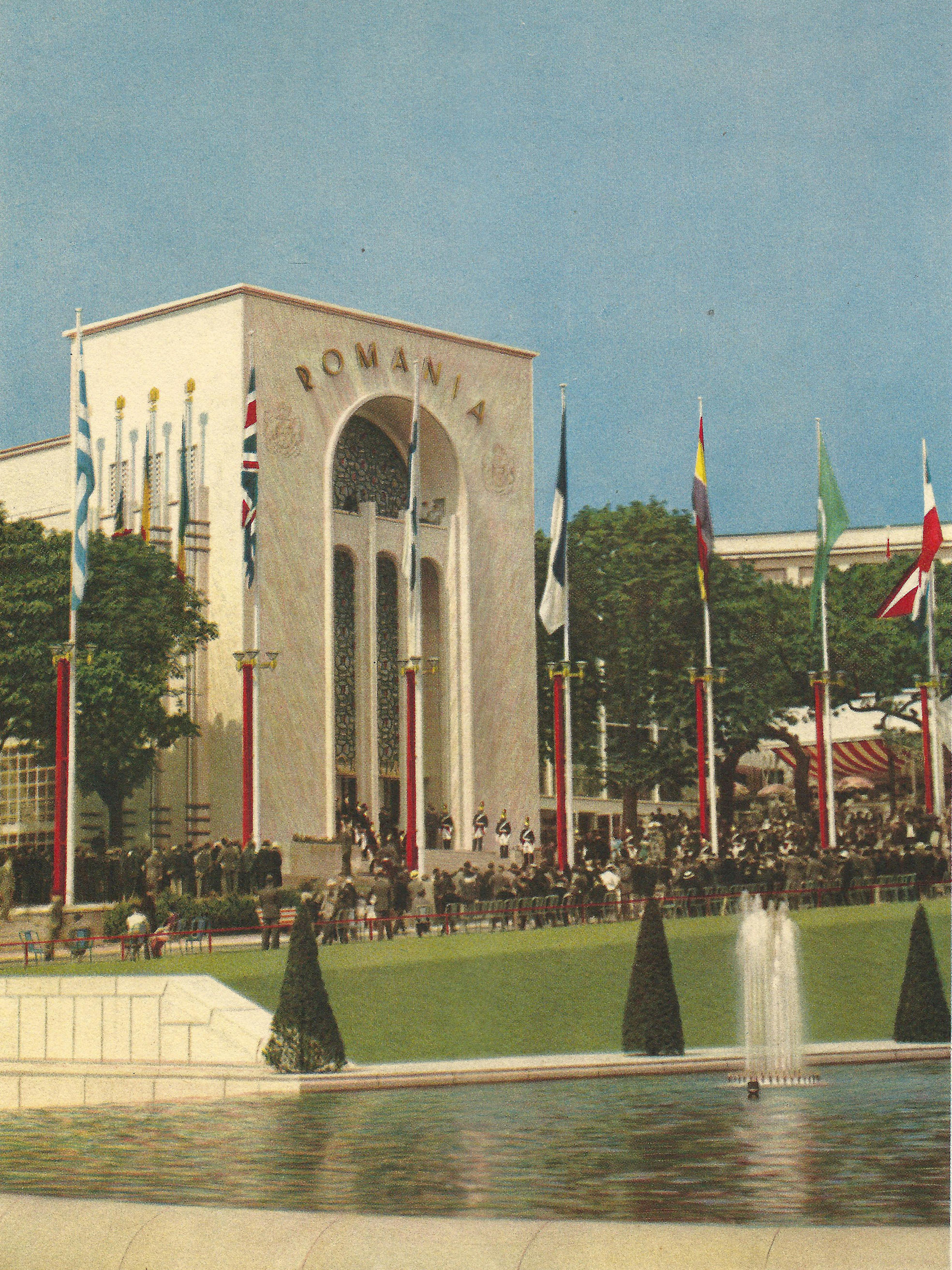
Romanian pavilion at EXPO Paris 1937

As the 1930s progressed, Romania's already shaky democracy slowly deteriorated toward fascist dictatorship. The constitution of 1923 gave the king free rein to dissolve parliament and call elections at will; as a result, Romania was to experience over 25 governments in a single decade.

Increasingly, these governments were dominated by a number of antisemitic, ultra-nationalist, and mostly at least quasi-fascist parties. The National Liberal Party steadily became more nationalistic than liberal, but nonetheless lost its dominance over Romanian politics. It was eclipsed by parties like the (relatively moderate) National Peasants' Party and its more radical Romanian Front offshoot, the National-Christian Defense League (LANC) and the Iron Guard. In 1935, LANC merged with the National Agrarian Party to form the National Christian Party (NCP). The quasi-mystical fascist Iron Guard was an earlier LANC offshoot that, even more than these other parties, exploited nationalist feelings, fear of communism, and resentment of alleged foreign and Jewish domination of the economy.

Already, the Iron Guard had embraced the politics of assassinations, and various governments had reacted more or less in kind. On 10 December 1933, Liberal prime minister Ion Duca "dissolved" the Iron Guard, arresting thousands; consequently, 19 days later he was assassinated by Iron Guard legionnaires.

In December 1937, the king appointed LANC leader, the poet Octavian Goga as prime minister of Romania's first Fascist government. Around this time, Carol met with Adolf Hitler, who expressed his wish to see a Romanian government headed by the pro-Nazi Iron Guard. Instead, on 10 February 1938 King Carol II used the occasion of a public insult by Goga toward Lupescu as a reason to dismiss the government and institute a short-lived royal dictatorship, sanctioned seventeen days later by a new constitution under which the king named personally not only the prime minister but all the ministers. The new regime featured corporatist policies that often resembled those of Fascist Italy and Nazi Germany. In parallel with these internal developments, economic pressures and a weak Franco-British response to Hitler's aggressive foreign policy caused Romania to start drifting away from the Western Allies and closer to the Axis.

In April 1938, King Carol had Iron Guard leader Corneliu Zelea Codreanu (aka "The Captain") arrested and imprisoned. On the night of 29–30 November 1938, Codreanu and several other legionnaires were killed while purportedly attempting to escape from prison.

The royal dictatorship was brief. On 7 March 1939, a new government was formed with Armand Călinescu as prime minister; on 21 September 1939, three weeks after the start of World War II, Călinescu, in turn, was also assassinated by legionnaires avenging Codreanu's murder.

Kingdom of Romania in 1939

On 13 April 1939, France and the United Kingdom had pledged to guarantee the independence of the Kingdom of Romania. Negotiations with the Soviet Union concerning a similar guarantee collapsed when Romania refused to allow the Red Army to cross its frontiers. In August 1939, Germany and the Soviet Union signed the Molotov–Ribbentrop Pact, which stipulated, among other things, the Soviet "interest" in Bessarabia. After the 1940 territorial losses and growing increasingly unpopular, Carol was compelled to abdicate and name general Ion Antonescu as the new Prime-Minister with full powers in ruling the state by royal decree.

== World War II and aftermath (1940–1947) ==
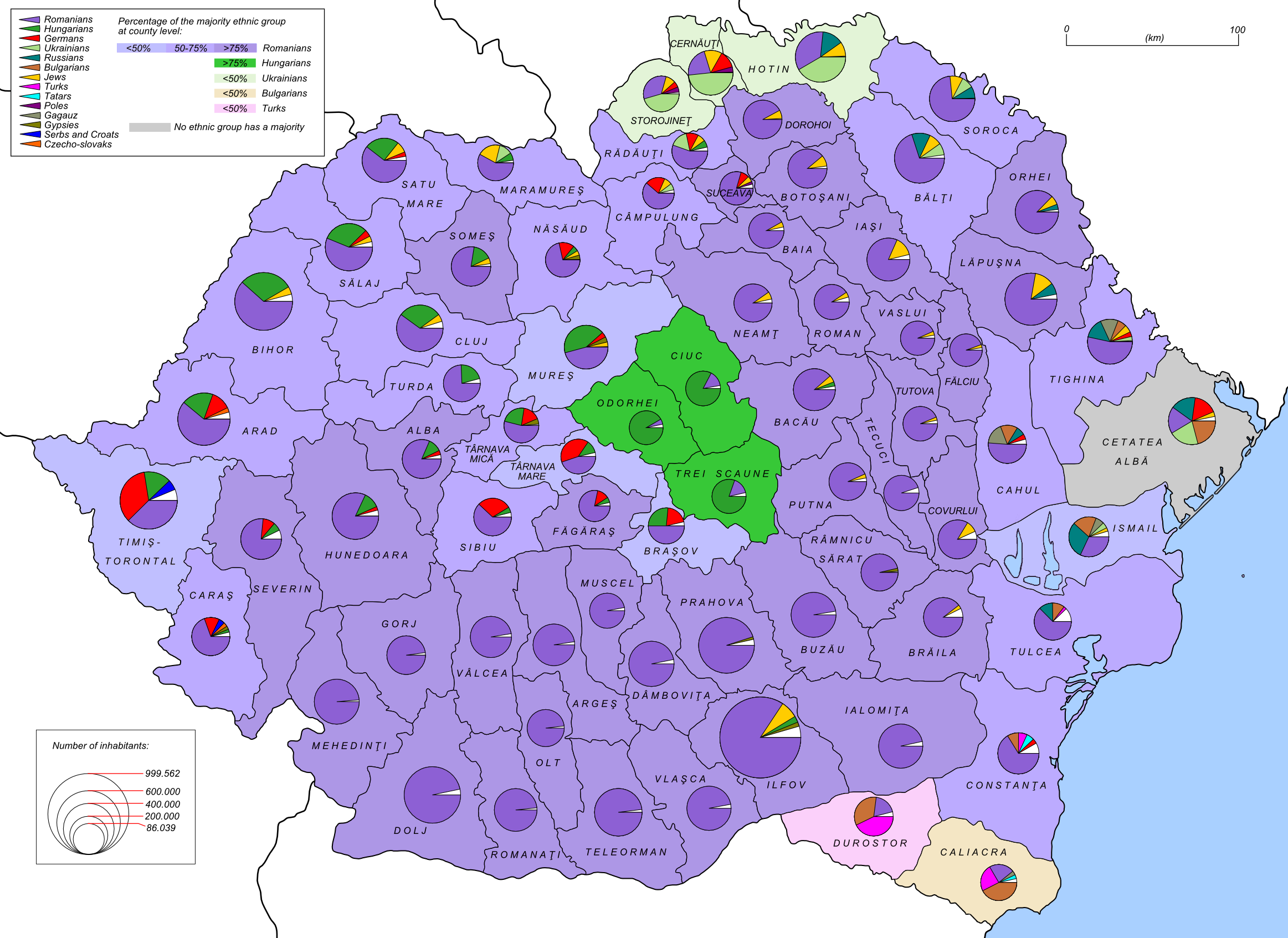
Ethnic map of Greater Romania according to the 1930 census. Sizeable ethnic minorities put Romania at odds with Hungary, Bulgaria, and the Soviet Union throughout the interwar period.

Eight days later Nazi Germany invaded the Second Polish Republic. Expecting military aid from Britain and France, Poland chose not to activate the Polish-Romanian Alliance in order to be able to use the Romanian Bridgehead strategy. A neutral Romania would be used to resupply the Polish troops and could be used as an escape corridor in case of defeat. Following the fall of Poland, the Polish government, the treasury of the National Bank of Poland and about 120,000 Polish troops withdrew through Romania, the majority of those troops joined the newly formed Polish Armed Forces in the West in France and the United Kingdom during 1939 and 1940.

Romania officially remained neutral and, under pressure from the Soviet Union and Germany, interned the fleeing Polish government after its members had crossed the Polish–Romanian border on 17 September, forcing them to relegate their authority to what became the Polish government-in-exile. After the assassination of Prime Minister Armand Călinescu on 21 September King Carol II tried to maintain neutrality for several months longer, but the surrender of the Third French Republic and the retreat of British forces from continental Europe rendered the assurances that both countries had made to Romania meaningless.

Romania after the territorial losses of 1940. The recovery of Bessarabia and Northern Bukovina was the catalyst for Romania's entry into the war on Germany's side.

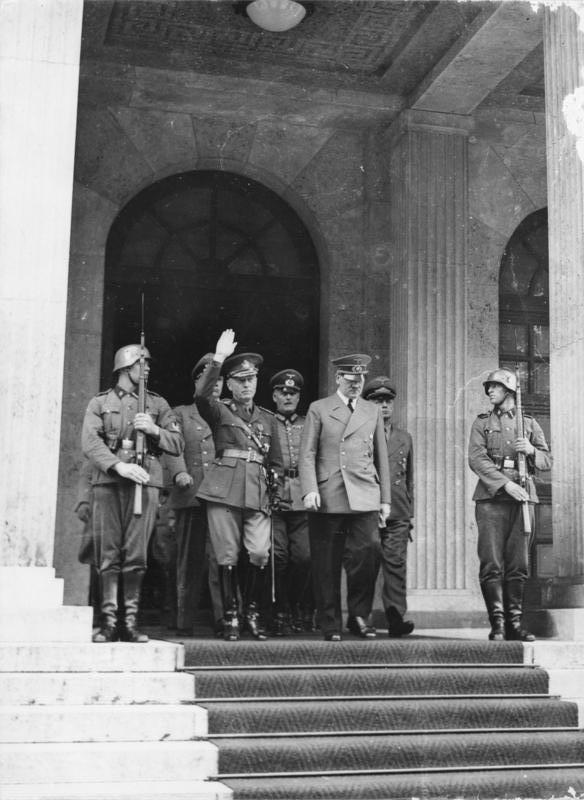
Antonescu and Adolf Hitler at the Führerbau in Munich, June 1941

In 1940 Romania's territorial gains made following World War I were largely undone. In July, after a Soviet ultimatum, Romania agreed to give up Bessarabia and northern Bukovina (the Soviets also annexed the city of Hertsa, which was not stated in the ultimatum). Two-thirds of Bessarabia were combined with a small part of the Soviet Union to form the Moldavian Soviet Socialist Republic. The rest (northern Bukovina, the northern half of Hotin county and Budjak) was apportioned to the Ukrainian Soviet Socialist Republic.

Shortly thereafter, on 30 August, under the Second Vienna Award, Germany and Italy mediated a compromise between Romania and the Kingdom of Hungary: Hungary received a region referred to as 'Northern Transylvania', while 'Southern Transylvania' remained part of Romania. Hungary had lost Transylvania after World War I in the Treaty of Trianon. On 7 September, under the Treaty of Craiova, Southern Dobruja (which Bulgaria had lost after the Romanian invasion during the Second Balkan War in 1913), was ceded to Bulgaria under pressure from Germany. Despite the relatively recent acquisition of these territories, they were inhabited by a majority of Romanian speaking people (except Southern Dobruja), so the Romanians had seen them as historically belonging to Romania, and the fact that so much land was lost without a fight shattered the underpinnings of King Carol's power.

On 4 July, Ion Gigurtu formed the first Romanian government to include an Iron Guardist minister, Horia Sima. Sima was a particularly virulent antisemite who had become the nominal leader of the movement after the death of Corneliu Codreanu. He was one of the few prominent far-right leaders to survive the bloody infighting and government suppression of the preceding years.

In the immediate wake of the loss of Northern Transylvania, on 4 September the Iron Guard (led by Horia Sima) and General (later Marshal) Ion Antonescu united to form the "National Legionary State", which forced the abdication of Carol II in favor of his 19-year-old son Michael. Carol and his mistress Magda Lupescu went into exile, and Romania, despite the unfavorable outcome of recent territorial disputes, leaned strongly toward the Axis. As part of the deal, the Iron Guard became the sole legal party in Romania. Antonescu became the Iron Guard's honorary leader, while Sima became deputy premier.

In power, the Iron Guard stiffened the already harsh antisemitic legislation, enacted legislation directed against minority businessmen and wreaked vengeance upon its enemies. On 8 October German troops began crossing into Romania. On 23 November Romania joined the Axis powers. On 27 November, 64 former dignitaries or officials were executed by the Iron Guard in Jilava prison while awaiting trial (see Jilava Massacre). Later that day, historian and former prime minister Nicolae Iorga and economist Virgil Madgearu, a former government minister, were assassinated.

The cohabitation between the Iron Guard and Antonescu was never an easy one. On 20 January 1941, the Iron Guard attempted a coup, combined with a pogrom against the Jews of Bucharest. Within four days, Antonescu had successfully suppressed the coup. The Iron Guard was forced out of the government. Sima and many other legionnaires took refuge in Germany; others were imprisoned. Antonescu abolished the National Legionary State, in its stead declaring Romania a "National and Social State."

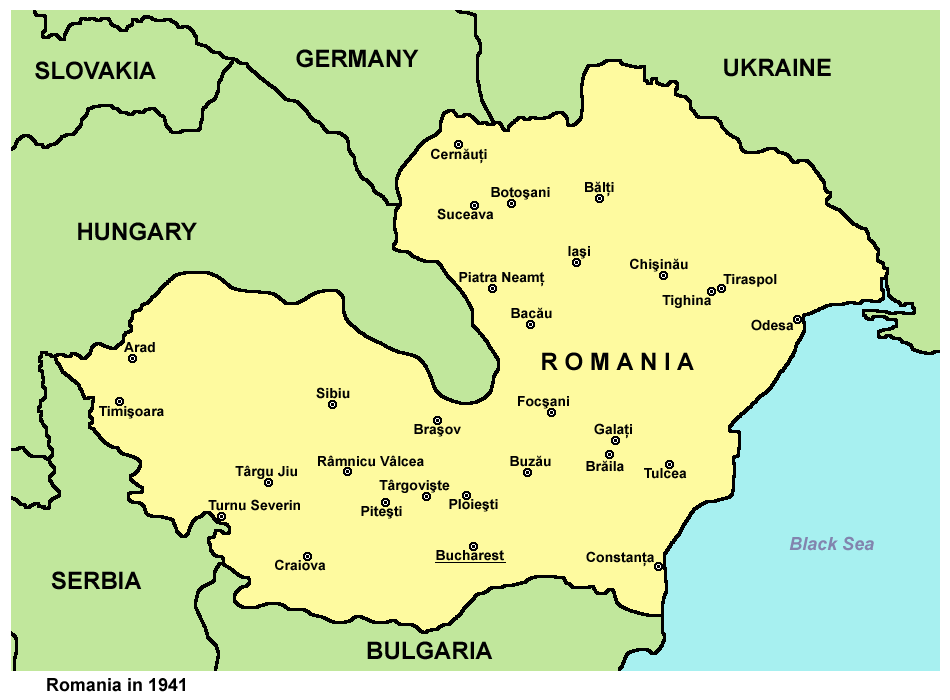
Romania administered Transnistria, the area between the Dniester and Southern Bug, in July 1941

1941 stamp depicting a Romanian and a German soldier in reference to the two countries' common participation in Operation Barbarossa, the text below reads the holy war against Bolshevism

On 22 June 1941, German armies with Romanian support attacked the Soviet Union. German and Romanian units conquered Bessarabia, Odessa, and Sevastopol, then marched eastward across the Russian steppes toward Stalingrad. Romania welcomed the war because they were allies with Germany. Hitler rewarded Romania's loyalty by returning Bessarabia and northern Bukovina and by allowing Romania to administer Soviet lands immediately between the Dniester and the Bug, including Odessa and Nikolaev. Romanian jingoes in Odessa even distributed a geography showing that the Dacians had inhabited most of southern Russia. After recovering Bessarabia and Bukovina (Operation München), Romanian units fought side by side with the Germans onward to Odessa, Sevastopol, Stalingrad and the Caucasus. The total number of troops involved on the Eastern Front with the Romanian Third Army and the Romanian Fourth Army was second only to that of Nazi Germany itself. The Romanian Army had a total of 686,258 men under arms in the summer of 1941 and a total of 1,224,691 men in the summer of 1944. The number of Romanian troops sent to fight in the Soviet Union exceeded that of all of Germany's other allies combined. A Country Study by the U.S. Federal Research Division of the Library of Congress attributes this to a "morbid competition with Hungary to curry Hitler's favor... [in hope of]... regaining northern Transylvania."

Bessarabia and the Northern Bukovina were now fully re-incorporated into the Romanian state after they had been occupied by the USSR a year earlier. As a substitute for Northern Transylvania, which had been given to Hungary following the Second Vienna Award, Hitler persuaded Antonescu in August 1941 to also take control of the Transnistria territory between the Dniester and the Southern Bug, which would also include Odessa after its eventual fall in October 1941. Although the Romanian administration set up a civil government, the Transnistria Governorate, the Romanian state had not yet formally incorporated Transnistria into its administrative framework by the time it was retaken by Soviet troops in early 1944.

Romanian armies advanced far into the Soviet Union during 1941 and 1942 before being involved in the disaster at the Battle of Stalingrad in the winter of 1942–43. Petre Dumitrescu, one of Romania's most important generals, was commander of the Third Army at Stalingrad. In November 1942, the German Sixth Army was briefly put at Dumitrescu's disposal during a German attempt to relieve the Third Army following the devastating Soviet Operation Uranus. Prior to the Soviet counteroffensive at Stalingrad, the Antonescu government considered a war with Hungary over Transylvania an inevitability after the expected victory over the Soviet Union.

=== King Michael's Coup ===
On 23 August 1944, with the Red Army penetrating German defenses during the Jassy–Kishinev Offensive, King Michael I of Romania led a successful coup against the Axis with support from opposition politicians, most of the army and Communist-led civilians. Michael I, who was initially considered to be not much more than a figurehead, was able to successfully depose the Antonescu dictatorship. The King then offered a non-confrontational retreat to German ambassador Manfred von Killinger. But the Germans considered the coup "reversible" and attempted to turn the situation around by military force. The Romanian First, Second (forming), and what little was left of the Third and the Fourth Armies (one corps) were under orders from the King to defend Romania against any German attacks. King Michael offered to put the Romanian Army, which at that point had a strength of nearly 1,000,000 men, on the side of the Allies. Stalin immediately recognized the king and the restoration of the conservative Romanian monarchy.

In a radio broadcast to the Romanian nation and army on the night of 23 August King Michael issued a cease-fire, proclaimed Romania's loyalty to the Allies, announced the acceptance of an armistice (to be signed on September 12) offered by Great Britain, the United States, and the USSR, and declared war on Germany. The coup accelerated the Red Army's advance into Romania, but did not avert a rapid Soviet occupation and capture of about 130,000 Romanian soldiers, who were transported to the Soviet Union, where many perished in prison camps. The armistice was signed three weeks later on 12 September 1944, on terms virtually dictated by the Soviet Union. Under the terms of the armistice, Romania announced its unconditional surrender to the USSR and was placed under occupation of the Allied forces with the Soviet Union as their representative, in control of media, communication, post, and civil administration behind the front. Some attribute the postponement of a formal Allied recognition of the de facto change of orientation until 12 September (the date the armistice was signed in Moscow) to the complexities of the negotiations between the USSR and UK.

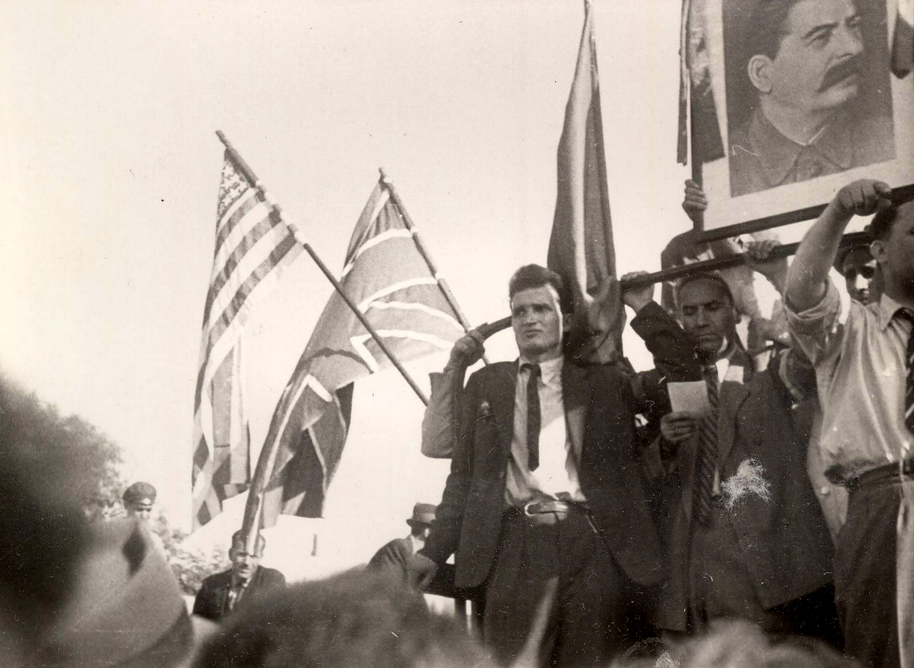
Nicolae Ceaușescu and others welcome the Red Army as it enters Bucharest on 30 August 1944

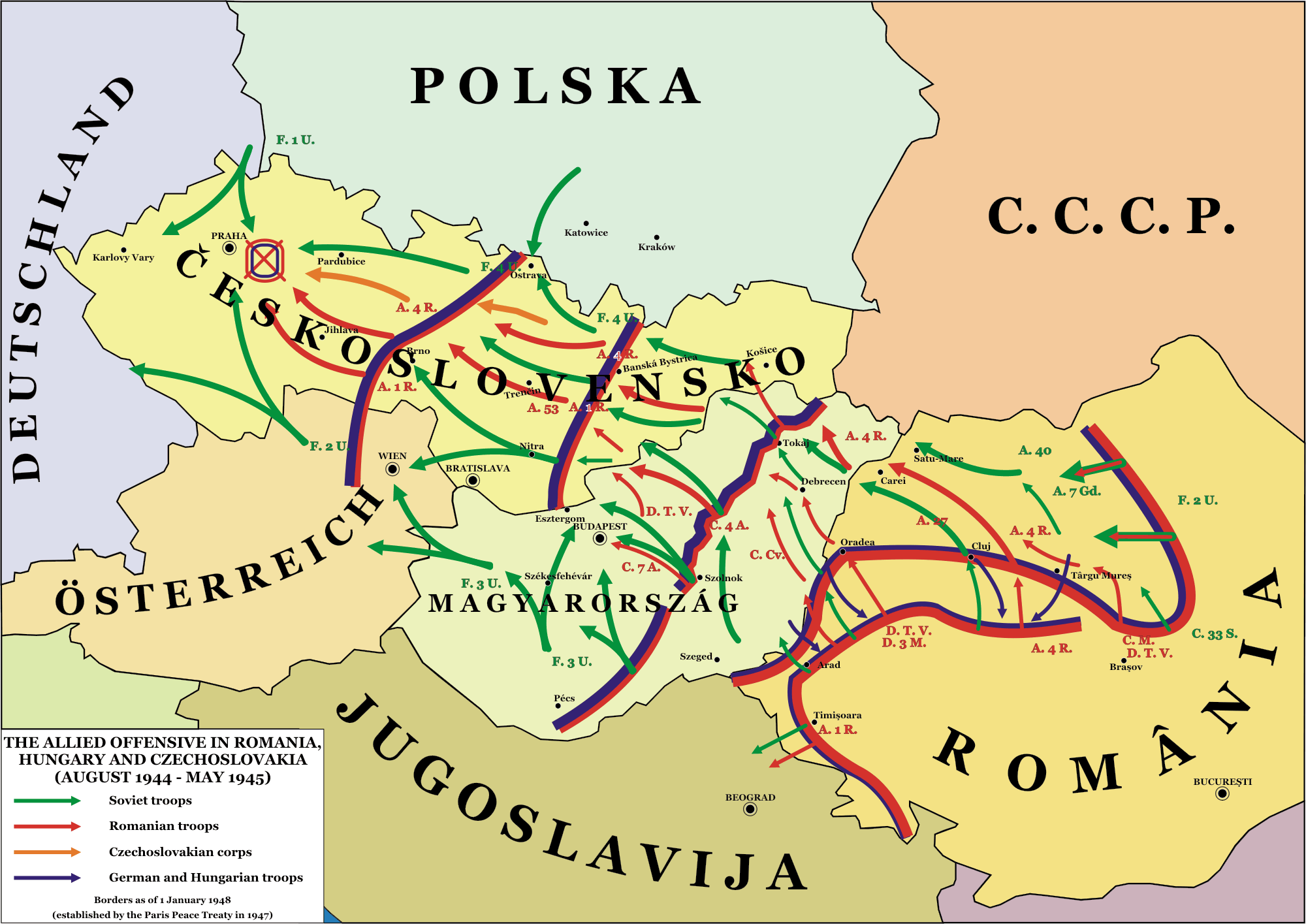
Allies operations against the Axis

During the Moscow Conference in October 1944 Winston Churchill, Prime Minister of the United Kingdom, proposed an agreement to Soviet leader Joseph Stalin on how to split up Eastern Europe into spheres of influence after the war. The Soviet Union was offered a 90% share of influence in Romania.

The Armistice Agreement of 12 September stipulated in Article 18 that "An Allied Control Commission will be established which will undertake until the conclusion of peace the regulation of and control over the execution of the present terms under the general direction and orders of the Allied (Soviet) High Command, acting on behalf of the Allied Powers". The Annex to Article 18 made clear that "The Romanian Government and their organs shall fulfil all instructions of the Allied Control Commission arising out of the Armistice Agreement." The Agreement also stipulated that the Allied Control Commission would have its seat in Bucharest. In line with Article 14 of the Armistice Agreement, two Romanian People's Tribunals were set up to try suspected war criminals.

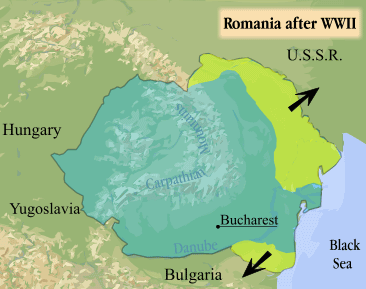
Map of Romanian territorial losses after World War II

As the country declared war on Germany on the night of 23 August 1944, border clashes between Hungarian and Romanian troops erupted almost immediately. On 24 August, German troops attempted to seize Bucharest and suppress Michael's coup, but were repelled by the city's defenses, which received some support from the United States Air Force. Other Wehrmacht units in the country suffered severe losses: remnants of the Sixth Army retreating west of the Prut River were cut off and destroyed by the Red Army, which was now advancing at an even greater speed, while Romanian units attacked German garrisons at the Ploiești oilfields, forcing them to retreat to Hungary. The Romanian Army captured over 50,000 German prisoners around this time, who were later surrendered to the Soviets.

In early September, Soviet and Romanian forces entered Transylvania and captured the towns of Brașov and Sibiu while advancing toward the Mureș River. Their main objective was Cluj (Cluj-Napoca), a city regarded as the historical capital of Transylvania. However, the Second Hungarian Army was present in the region, and together with the Eighth German Army engaged the Allied forces on 5 September in what was to become the Battle of Turda, which lasted until 8 October and resulted in heavy casualties for both sides. Also around this time, the Hungarian Army carried out its last independent offensive action of the war, penetrating Arad County in western Romania. Despite initial success, a number of ad hoc Romanian cadet battalions managed to stop the Hungarian advance at the Battle of Păuliș, and soon a combined Romanian-Soviet counterattack overwhelmed the Hungarians, who gave ground and evacuated Arad itself on 21 September.

The Romanian Army ended the war fighting against the Wehrmacht alongside the Red Army in Transylvania, Hungary, Yugoslavia, Austria and the Protectorate of Bohemia and Moravia, from August 1944 until the end of the war in Europe. In May 1945, the First and Fourth armies took part in the Prague Offensive. The Romanian Army incurred heavy casualties fighting Nazi Germany. Of some 538,000 Romanian soldiers who fought against the Axis in 1944–45, some 167,000 were killed, wounded or went missing.

Under the 1947 Treaty of Paris, the Allies did not acknowledge Romania as a co-belligerent nation but instead applied the term "ally of Hitlerite Germany" to all recipients of the treaty's stipulations. Like Finland, Romania had to pay $300 million to the Soviet Union as war reparations. However, the treaty specifically acknowledged that Romania switched sides on 24 August 1944, and therefore "acted in the interests of all the United Nations". As a reward, Northern Transylvania was, once again, recognized as an integral part of Romania, but the border with the USSR and Bulgaria was fixed at its state in January 1941, restoring the pre-Barbarossa status quo (with one exception). Following the dissolution of the Soviet Union in 1991, the Eastern territories became part of Ukraine and the Republic of Moldova.

== Communist period (1947–1989) ==
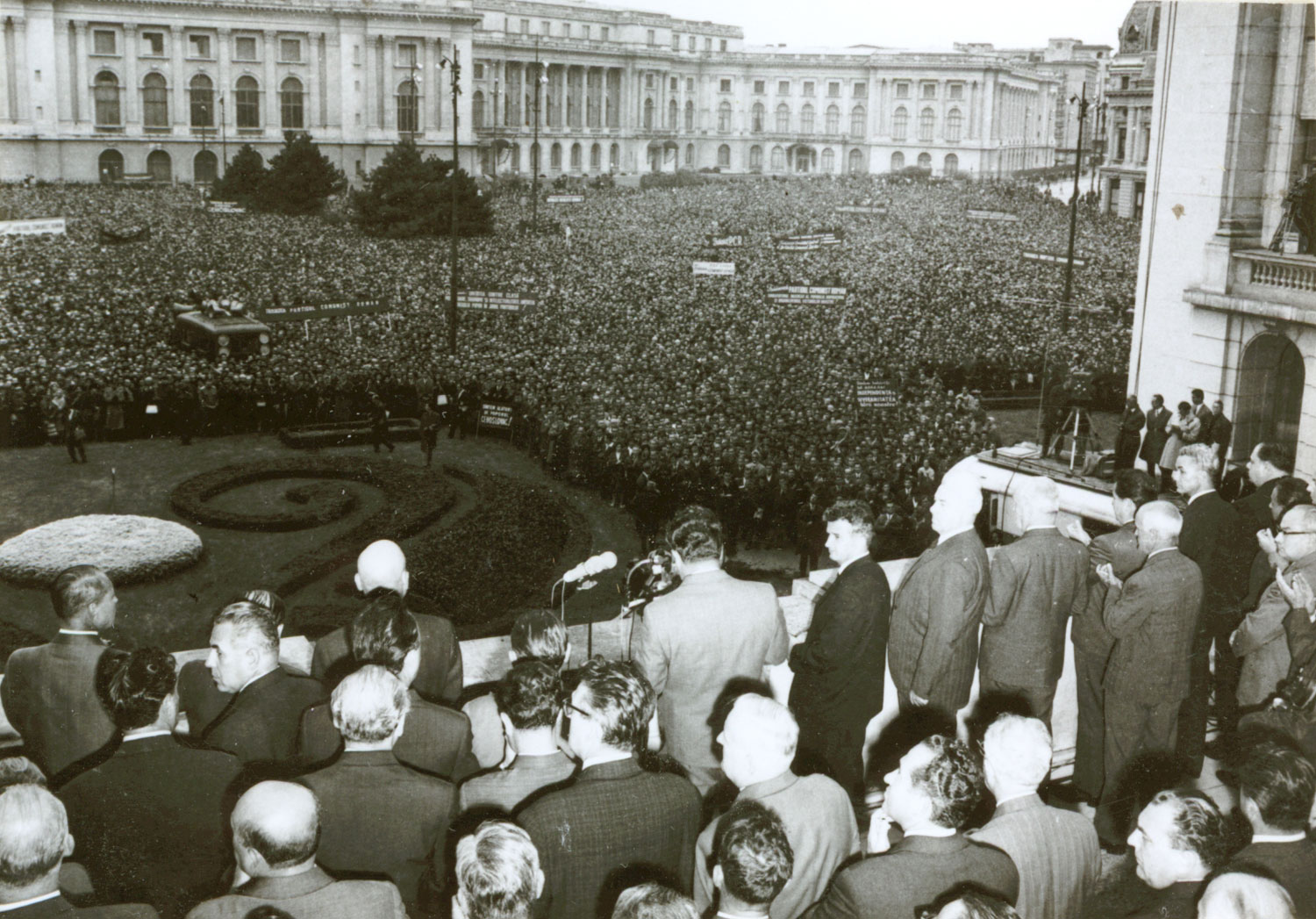
Nicolae Ceaușescu condemning the Warsaw Pact invasion of Czechoslovakia in 1968

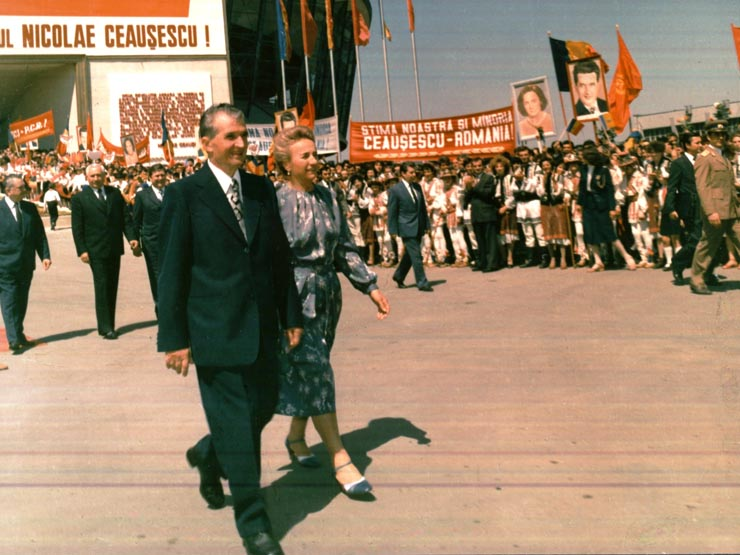
The Communist government fostered the personality cult of Nicolae Ceaușescu and his wife Elena, 1986.

In Romania proper, Soviet occupation following World War II facilitated the rise of the Communist Party as the main political force, leading ultimately to the forced abdication of the King and the establishment of a single-party people's republic in 1947.

Romania was proclaimed a people's republic and remained under military and economic control of the Soviet Union until the late 1950s. During this period, Romania's resources were drained by the "SovRom" agreements; mixed Soviet-Romanian companies were established to mask the Soviet Union's looting of Romania.

Romania's leader from 1948 to his death in 1965 was Gheorghe Gheorghiu-Dej, the First Secretary of the Romanian Workers' Party. The Communist regime was formalized with the constitution of 13 April 1948. On 11 June 1948, all banks and large businesses were nationalized. This started the process of the Romanian Communist Party to collectivize the Romania's resources including agriculture.

In 1946 and 1947, several high-ranking members in the pro-Axis government were executed as war criminals, primarily for their involvement in the Holocaust and for attacking the Soviet Union. Antonescu himself was executed 1 June 1946. Once the Communist government became more entrenched, the number of arrests increased. All strata of society were involved, but particularly targeted were the prewar elites, such as intellectuals, and anybody who could potentially form the nucleus of anti-Communist resistance. According to figures, in the years between 1945 and 1964, 73,334 people were arrested. Between 60,000 and 80,000 political prisoners were detained.

Gheorghiu-Dej attained greater independence for Romania from the Soviet Union by persuading Soviet First Secretary Nikita Khrushchev to withdraw troops from Romania in April 1958. After the negotiated withdrawal of Soviet troops, Romania under the new leadership of Nicolae Ceaușescu started to pursue independent policies, including the condemnation of the Soviet-led 1968 invasion of Czechoslovakia—Romania being the only Warsaw Pact country not to take part in the invasion—the continuation of diplomatic relations with Israel after the Six-Day War of 1967 (again, the only Warsaw Pact country to do so), and the establishment of economic (1963) and diplomatic (1967) relations with West Germany. Romania's close ties with Arab countries and the Palestine Liberation Organization (PLO) allowed it to play a key role in the Israel-Egypt and Israel-PLO peace processes by intermediating the visit of Egyptian president Sadat to Israel.

Between 1977 and 1981, Romania's foreign debt sharply increased from US$3 to US$10 billion and the influence of international financial organizations such as the IMF and the World Bank grew, in conflict with Ceaușescu's autarchic policies. Ceaușescu's independent foreign policy meant leaders of Western nations leaders were slow to criticize Romania's government which, by the late 1970s, had become arbitrary, capricious and harsh. The Romanian economy grew quickly through foreign credit but this was replaced with austerity and political repression, which became more draconian through the 1980s.

Before austerity Romania had made considerable progress in many areas. Between 1950 and 1973 Romania joined Yugoslavia and Bulgaria in achieving average annual growth rates that were above both the Central European and the West European average. During the first three post-war decades Romania industrialized faster than Spain, Greece, and Portugal. The infant mortality rate plummeted from 139 per 1,000 during the interwar period to 35 in the 1970's. During the interwar period half the population was illiterate but under the communist government illiteracy was eradicated. The population became urbanized, women's rights greatly improved, life expectancy grew, among many other achievements.

Ceaușescu eventually initiated a project of full reimbursement of the foreign debt; to achieve this, he imposed austerity policies that impoverished Romanians and exhausted the nation's economy. The project was completed in 1989, shortly before his overthrow. He greatly extended the authority of the Securitate (secret police) and imposed a cult of personality, leading to a dramatic decrease in Ceaușescu's popularity and culminating in his overthrow and execution in the bloody Romanian Revolution in December 1989.

== 1989 Revolution ==
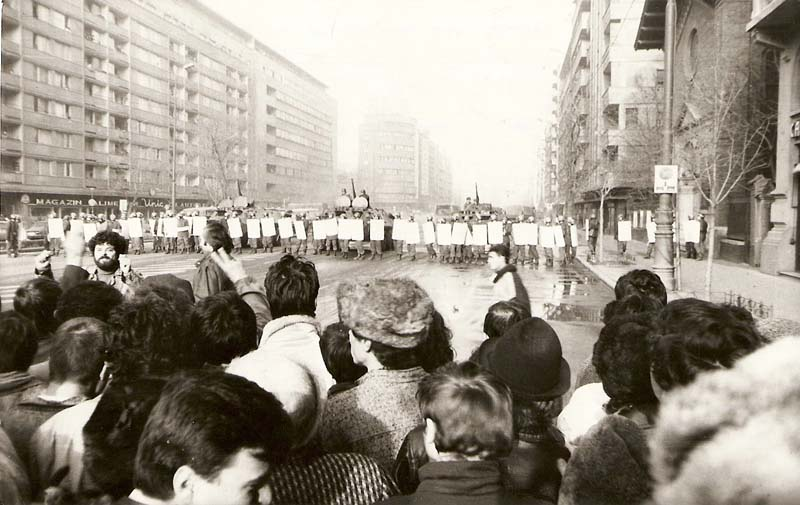
Tanks and Miliția on the Magheru Boulevard in Bucharest during the 1989 Revolution

The Romanian Revolution resulted in more than 1,100 deaths in Timișoara and Bucharest, and brought the fall of Ceaușescu and the end of the Communist regime in Romania. After a week of unrest in Timișoara, a mass rally summoned in Bucharest in support of Ceaușescu on 21 December 1989 turned hostile. The Ceaușescu couple fled Bucharest by helicopter but ended up in the custody of the army.

After being tried and convicted by a kangaroo court for genocide and other crimes, they were executed on 25 December 1989.

Ion Iliescu, a former Communist Party official marginalized by Ceaușescu, attained national recognition as the leader of an impromptu governing coalition, the National Salvation Front (FSN) that proclaimed the establishment of democracy and civil liberties on 22 December 1989. The Communist Party was initially outlawed by Iliescu, but he soon revoked that decision; as a consequence, Communism is not outlawed in Romania today. However, Ceaușescu's most controversial measures, such as bans on abortion and contraception, were among the first laws to be changed after the Revolution.

== Transition to free market (1990–2004) ==
After the fall of Ceaușescu, the National Salvation Front (FSN) led by Iliescu introduced partial multi-party democratic and free market measures. A university professor with family roots in the Communist Party, Petre Roman, was named prime minister of the new government, which mostly consisted of former communist officials. The government initiated modest free market reforms. Several major political parties of the pre-war era, the National Christian Democrat Peasant's Party (PNȚ-CD), the National Liberal Party (PNL), and the Romanian Social Democratic Party (PSDR), were reconstituted.

From April to June 1990, a series of anti-government protests known as the Golaniad took place in Bucharest's University Square, against the FSN consisting of several former Communists and Securitate officials. General elections were held on 20 May 1990, the first free ones since 1937. Benefitting from the FSN's tight media control, Iliescu won the presidency with 85% of the vote, whilst the FSN secured two-thirds of the seats in Parliament. Although most protesters left University Square after the elections, a minority deemed the results illegitimate and demanded the exclusion from political life of the former high-ranking Communist Party members. The peaceful demonstrations degenerated into violence; some of the protesters attacked the police headquarters, national television station, and the Foreign Ministry. After the police failed to bring the demonstrators to order, Iliescu called on the "men of good will" to defend the state institutions in Bucharest.

Various worker groups from Romania's industrial platforms responded, some of them engaged in altercations with the protesters. The coal miners of the Jiu Valley, thousands of whom arrived in Bucharest on 14 June, were the most visible and politically influential. According to the miners, most of the violence was perpetrated by government agents who were agitating the crowds. Some of the counter-protesters attacked the headquarters and private residences of opposition leaders. Later parliamentary inquiries showed members of the government intelligence services were involved in the instigation and manipulation of both the protesters and the miners, and in June 1994, a Bucharest court found two former Securitate officers guilty of ransacking and stealing $100,000 from the house of a leading opposition politician. Roman's government fell in late September 1991, when the miners returned to Bucharest to demand higher salaries. A technocrat, Theodor Stolojan, was appointed to head an interim government until new elections could be held.

=== 1991 constitution ===
In the first referendum in post-Decembrist Romania, a new constitution was adopted in 1991, being revised in 2003. In 2018, 93.4% of the electorate voted in favor of amending the constitution definition of family in order to prohibit same-sex marriage, although the change was not implemented due to an only 21% voter turnout.

=== After 1991 ===
In March 1992, the FSN split into two groups: the Democratic National Front (FDSN), led by Iliescu and the Democratic Party (PD), led by Roman. Iliescu won the presidential elections in September 1992 and his FDSN won the general elections held at the same time. With parliamentary support from the nationalist Romanian National Unity Party (PUNR), Greater Romania Party (PRM), and the ex-communist Socialist Workers' Party (PSM), a new government was formed in November 1992 under Prime Minister Nicolae Văcăroiu. The FDSN changed its name to Party of Social Democracy in Romania (PDSR) in July 1993.

The subsequent disintegration of the National Salvation Front (FSN) produced the Party of Social Democracy in Romania (PDSR) (later Social Democratic Party, PSD), the Democratic Party (PD), and the ApR (Alliance for Romania). The PDSR party governed Romania from 1990 until 1996 through several coalitions and governments with Iliescu as head of state. Emil Constantinescu of the Democratic Convention (CDR) won the second round of the 1996 presidential election and replaced Iliescu as head of state. The PDSR won the largest number of seats but failed to form a viable coalition. Constituent parties of the CDR joined the Democratic Party (PD) and the Democratic Alliance of Hungarians in Romania (UDMR/RMDSZ) to form a centrist coalition government, holding 60% of the seats. This coalition implemented several critical reforms. The new coalition government, under prime minister Victor Ciorbea remained in office until March 1998, when Radu Vasile (PNȚ-CD) took over as prime minister. The former governor of the National Bank, Mugur Isărescu, eventually replaced Radu Vasile as head of the government.

The 2000 election brought Iliescu's PDSR, known as Social Democratic Party (PSD) after the merger with the PSDR, back to power. Iliescu won a third term as the country's president. Adrian Năstase became the prime minister of the newly formed government.

In 2004, Traian Băsescu was elected president with an electoral coalition called Justice and Truth Alliance (DA). The government was formed by a larger coalition which also included the Conservative Party (PC) and the Democratic Alliance of Hungarians in Romania (UDMR).

== NATO and the European Union membership (2004–present) ==
Post–Cold War Romania developed closer ties with Western Europe, eventually joining NATO in 2004 and the EU in 2007.

General elections took place on in 2004, with the joint PNL-PD candidate Traian Băsescu winning the second round with 51% of the vote.

Then-PNL leader, Călin Popescu-Tăriceanu was assigned the task of building a coalition government without the PSD. In December 2004, the new coalition government (PD, PNL, PUR —Romanian Humanist Party—which eventually changed its name to Romanian Conservative Party/PC and UDMR/RMDSZ—was sworn in under Prime Minister Tăriceanu.

Following the free travel agreement and politic of the post–Cold War period, as well as hardship of the life in the post 1990s economic depression, Romania has an increasingly large diaspora. The main emigration targets have been Italy, Germany, Spain, the United Kingdom, the United States and Hungary.

In 2009, President Traian Băsescu was re-elected as the President.

In January 2012, Romania experienced national protests, which were the first significant popular uprising in the country since 1991. They were triggered by proposed health reforms, and were further motivated by wider disillusionment with austerity and the government.

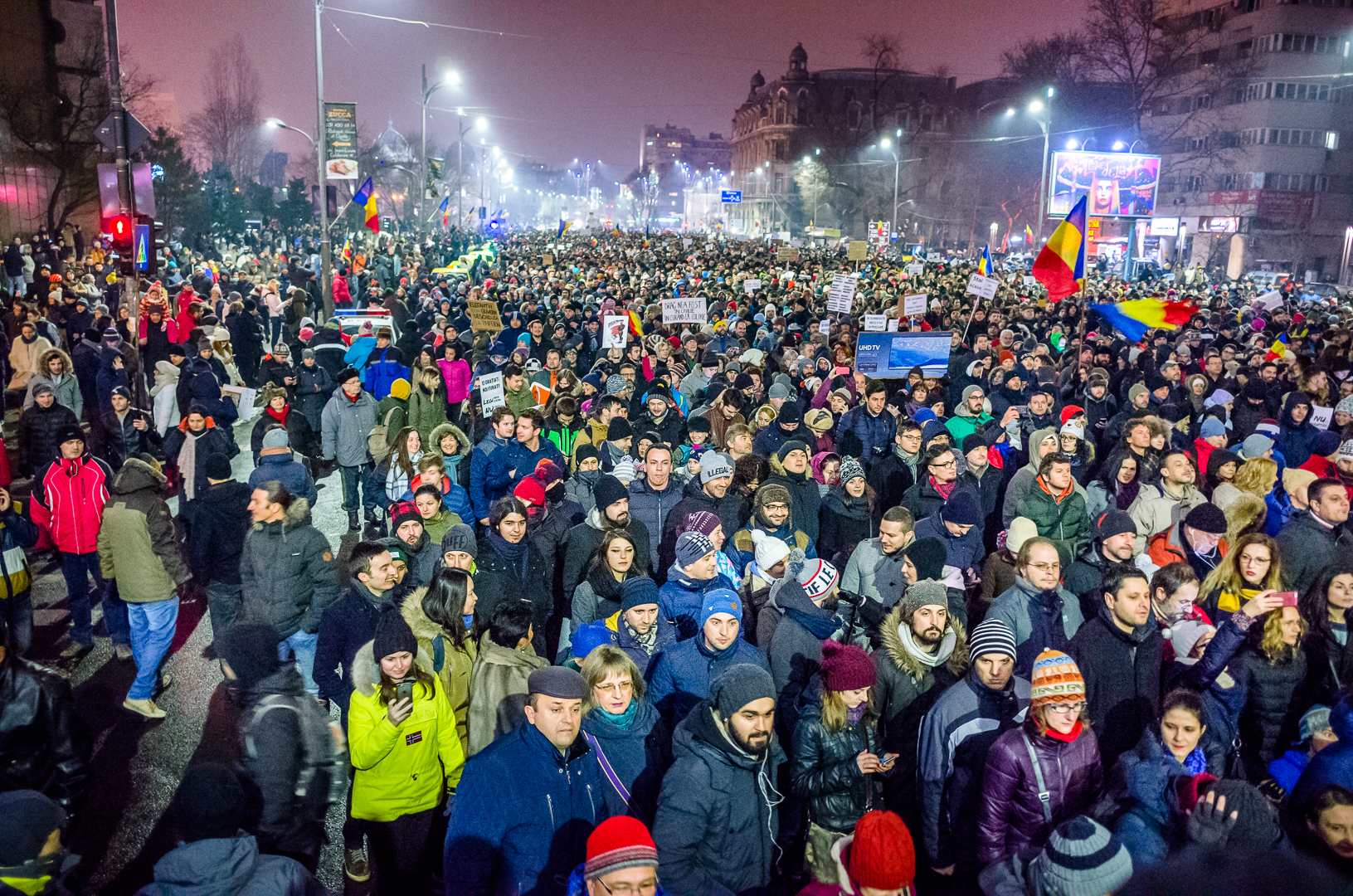
Romania has seen its largest waves of protests against judicial reform ordinances of the PSD-ALDE coalition during the 2017–2019 Romanian protests

Klaus Iohannis was elected president in 2014, being re-elected in 2019, and serving until his resignation in 2025 in the aftermath of the annulment of the 2024 presidential election in which he did not stand.

The 2020 parliamentary election, which took place during the COVID-19 pandemic, resulted in PNL senator Florin Cîțu forming a center-right coalition consisting of two other parties. Following the 2021 political crisis, a grand coalition was agreed upon between the PNL and PSD in which they would rule Romania together for or the next seven years. Thus, it was agreed that the prime minister of Romania and several other important ministries would rotate every year and a half. Nicolae Ciucă of PNL consequently succeeded Cîțu in November 2021, himself being succeeded by PSD leader Marcel Ciolacu in June 2023.

In the 2024 presidential election, Independent candidate Călin Georgescu achieved a surprise win in the first round. However, the Constitutional Court annulled the election results, citing alleged Russian meddling. The cancellation led to widespread protests, criticism by the United States, and Ilie Bolojan becoming acting president in February 2025 as Iohannis resigned to political pressure.

On 1 January 2025, Romania fully joined the Schengen Area.

== Romanian rulers ==
- List of princes of Wallachia (up to 1859)
- List of monarchs of Moldavia (up to 1859)
- Lists of political office-holders in Transylvania (up to 1867)
- Domnitori of Romania (1862–1881)
- King of Romania (1881–1947)
- President of Romania (since 1974)
- Prime ministers of Romania (since 1862)

== See also ==
- Balkan–Danubian culture
- Bulgarian lands across the Danube
- Historical regions of Romania
- King of Romania
- List of Dacian kings
- List of heads of government of Romania
- List of presidents of Romania
- List of wars involving Romania
- Military history of Romania
- Politics of Romania
- Territorial evolution of Romania

== Sources ==
=== Ancient ===
- Appian (165). Historia Romana [Roman History] (in Ancient Greek).
- Herodotus. Histories (in Ancient Greek).
- Pliny (the Elder); Rackham, Harris (1971). Pliny Natural History, Volume 2. Harvard University Press.
- Strabo. Geographica [Geography] (in Ancient Greek).

=== Modern ===
- Andea, Susan (2006). History of Romania: compendium. Romanian Cultural Institute. ISBN 978-973-7784-12-4.
- Armbruster, Adolf (1972). Romanitatea românilor: Istoria unei idei [The Romanity of the Romanians: The History of an Idea]. Romanian Academy Publishing House.
- Astarita, Maria Laura (1983). Avidio Cassio. Ed. di Storia e Letteratura. OCLC 461867183.
- Berciu, Dumitru (1981). Buridava dacica, Volume 1. Editura Academiei.
- Bertényi, Iván (1989). Nagy Lajos király [King Louis the Great]. Kossuth Könyvkiadó. ISBN 963-09-3388-8.
- Bunbury, Edward Herbert (1979). A history of ancient geography among the Greeks and Romans: from the earliest ages till the fall of the Roman empire. London: Humanities Press International. ISBN 978-9-070-26511-3.
- Bunson, Matthew (1995). A Dictionary of the Roman Empire. OUP. ISBN 978-0-195-10233-8.
- Burns, Thomas S. (1991). A History of the Ostrogoths. Indiana University Press. ISBN 978-0-253-20600-8.
- Bury, John Bagnell; Cook, Stanley Arthur; Adcock, Frank E.; Percival Charlesworth, Martin (1954). Rome and the Mediterranean, 218-133 BC. The Cambridge Ancient History. Macmillan.
- Chakraberty, Chandra (1948). The prehistory of India: tribal migrations. Vijayakrishna.
- Clarke, John R. (2003). Art in the Lives of Ordinary Romans: Visual Representation and Non-Elite Viewers in Italy, 100 B.C.-A.D. 315. University of California. ISBN 978-0-520-21976-2.
- Crossland, R.A.; Boardman, John (1982). Linguistic problems of the Balkan area in the late prehistoric and early Classical period. The Cambridge Ancient History. Vol. 3. CUP. ISBN 978-0-521-22496-3.
- Curta, Florin (2006). Southeastern Europe in the Middle Ages, 500–1250. Cambridge: Cambridge University Press. ISBN 9780521815390.
- Dana, Dan; Matei-Popescu, Florian (2009). "Soldats d'origine dace dans les diplômes militaires" [Soldiers of Dacian origin in the military diplomas]. Chiron (in French). 39. Berlin: German Archaeological Institute/Walter de Gruyter. ISSN 0069-3715. Archived from the original on 1 July 2013.
- Dobiáš, Josef (1964). "The sense of the victoria formulae on Roman inscriptions and some new epigraphic monuments from lower Pannonia". In Češka, Josef; Hejzlar, Gabriel (eds.). Mnema Vladimír Groh. Praha: Státní pedagogické nakladatelství. pp. 37–52.
- Eisler, Robert (1951). Man into wolf: an anthropological interpretation of sadism, masochism, and lycanthropy. London: Routledge and Kegan Paul. ASIN B0000CI25D.
- Eliade, Mircea (1986). Zalmoxis, the vanishing God: comparative studies in the religions and folklore of Dacia and Eastern Europe. University of Chicago Press. ISBN 978-0-226-20385-0.
- Eliade, Mircea (1995). Ivănescu, Maria; Ivănescu, Cezar (eds.). De la Zalmoxis la Genghis-Han: studii comparative despre religiile și folclorul Daciei și Europei Orientale [From Zalmoxis to Genghis Khan: comparative studies in the religions and folklore of Dacia and Eastern Europe] (in Romanian) (Based on the translation from French of De Zalmoxis à Gengis-Khan, Payot, Paris, 1970 ed.). București, Romania: Humanitas. ISBN 978-9-732-80554-1.
- Ellis, L. (1998). 'Terra deserta': population, politics, and the [de]colonization of Dacia. World archaeology. Routledge. ISBN 978-0-415-19809-7.
- Erdkamp, Paul (2010). A Companion to the Roman Army. Blackwell Companions to the Ancient World. London: John Wiley and Sons. ISBN 978-1-4443-3921-5.
- Everitt, Anthony (2010). Hadrian and the Triumph of Rome. Random House Trade. ISBN 978-0-812-97814-8.
- Fol, Alexander (1996). "Thracians, Celts, Illyrians and Dacians". In de Laet, Sigfried J. (ed.). History of Humanity. History of Humanity. Vol. 3: From the seventh century B.C. to the seventh century A.D. UNESCO. ISBN 978-9-231-02812-0.
- Găzdac, Cristian (2010). Monetary circulation in Dacia and the provinces from the Middle and Lower Danube from Trajan to Constantine I: (AD 106–337). Volume 7 of Coins from Roman sites and collections of Roman coins from Romania. ISBN 978-606-543-040-2.
- Georgescu, Vlad (1991). Călinescu, Matei (ed.). The Romanians: a history. Romanian literature and thought in translation series. Columbus, Ohio: Ohio State University Press. ISBN 978-0-8142-0511-2.
- Gibbon, Edward (2008) [1776]. The History of the Decline and Fall of the Roman Empire. Vol. 1. Cosimo Classics. ISBN 978-1-605-20120-7.
- Glodariu, Ioan; Pop, Ioan Aurel; Nagler, Thomas (2005). "The history and civilization of the Dacians". The history of Transylvania Until 1541. Romanian Cultural Institute, Cluj Napoca. ISBN 978-9-737-78400-1.
- Goffart, Walter A. (2006). Barbarian Tides: The Migration Age and the Later Roman Empire. University of Pennsylvania Press. ISBN 978-0-812-23939-3.
- Goldsworthy, Adrian (2003). The Complete Roman Army. Complete Series. London: Thames & Hudson. ISBN 978-0-500-05124-5.
- Goldsworthy, Adrian (2004). In the Name of Rome: The Men Who Won the Roman Empire. Weidenfeld & Nicolson. ISBN 978-0297846666.
- Goodman, Martin; Sherwood, Jane (2002). The Roman World 44 BC–AD 180. Routledge. ISBN 978-0-203-40861-2.
- Heather, Peter (2010). Empires and Barbarians: Migration, Development, and the Birth of Europe. OUP. ISBN 978-0-199-73560-0.
- Mykhaĭlo Hrushevskyĭ; Andrzej Poppe; Marta Skorupsky; Frank E. Sysyn; Uliana M. Pasicznyk (1997). History of Ukraine-Rus': From prehistory to the eleventh century. Canadian Institute of Ukrainian Studies Press. ISBN 978-1-895571-19-6.
- Jeanmaire, Henri (1975). Couroi et courètes (in French). New York: Arno. ISBN 978-0-405-07001-3.
- Kephart, Calvin (1949). Sanskrit: its origin, composition, and diffusion. Shenandoah.
- Köpeczi, Béla; Makkai, László; Mócsy, András; Szász, Zoltán; Barta, Gábor, eds. (1994). History of Transylvania – From the Beginnings to 1606. Budapest: Akadémiai Kiadó. ISBN 978-963-05-6703-9.
- Kristó, Gyula (1988). A vármegyék kialakulása Magyarországon ("The formation of counties in Hungary"). Budapest: Magvető Könyvkiadó. ISBN 978-963-14-1189-8.
- Kristó, Gyula (1996). Hungarian History in the Ninth Century. Szegedi Középkorász Muhely. ISBN 978-963-482-113-7.
- Kristó, Gyula (2003). Early Transylvania (895–1324). Budapest: Lucidus. ISBN 963-9465-12-7.
- Luttwak, Edward (1976). The grand strategy of the Roman Empire from the first century A.D. to the third. Johns Hopkins University Press. ISBN 9780801818639.
- MacKendrick, Paul Lachlan (2000) [1975]. The Dacian Stones Speak. The University of North Carolina Press. ISBN 978-0-8078-4939-2.
- Matyszak, Philip (2004). The Enemies of Rome: From Hannibal to Attila the Hun. Thames & Hudson. ISBN 978-0500251249.
- Millar, Fergus (1970). The Roman Empire and its Neighbours. Weidenfeld & Nicolson. ISBN 9780297000655.
- Millar, Fergus (2004). Cotton, Hannah M.; Rogers, Guy M. (eds.). Rome, the Greek World, and the East. Vol. 2: Government, Society, and Culture in the Roman Empire. University of North Carolina. ISBN 978-0807855201.
- Minns, Ellis Hovell (2011) [1913]. Scythians and Greeks: a survey of ancient history and archaeology on the north coast of the Euxine from the Danube to the Caucasus. CUP. ISBN 978-1-108-02487-7.
- Mountain, Harry (1998). The Celtic Encyclopedia. Universal Publishers. ISBN 978-1-58112-890-1.
- Mulvin, Lynda (2002). Late Roman Villas in the Danube-Balkan Region. British Archaeological Reports. ISBN 978-1-841-71444-8.
- Murray, Tim (2001). Encyclopedia of archaeology: Volume 1, Part 1 (illustrated ed.). ABC-Clio. ISBN 978-1-57607-198-4.
- Nandris, John (1976). Friesinger, Herwig; Kerchler, Helga; Pittioni, Richard; Mitscha-Märheim, Herbert (eds.). "The Dacian Iron Age – A Comment in a European Context". Archaeologia Austriaca. 13 (13–14) (Festschrift für Richard Pittioni zum siebzigsten Geburtstag ed.). Vienna: Deuticke. ISBN 978-3-700-54420-3. ISSN 0003-8008.
- Nixon, C. E. V.; Saylor Rodgers, Barbara (1995). In Praise of Later Roman Emperors: The Panegyric Latini. University of California. ISBN 978-0-520-08326-4.
- Odahl, Charles (2003). Constantine and the Christian Empire. Routledge. ISBN 9781134686315.
- Oledzki, M. (2000). "La Tène Culture in the Upper Tisza Basin". Ethnographisch-Archäologische Zeitschrift. 41 (4): 507–530.
- Oltean, Ioana Adina (2007). Dacia: Landscape, Colonization and Romanization. Routledge. ISBN 978-0-415-41252-0.
- Opreanu, Coriolan Horațiu (2005). "The North-Danube Regions from the Roman Province of Dacia to the Emergence of the Romanian Language (2nd–8th Centuries AD)". In Pop, Ioan-Aurel; Bolovan, Ioan (eds.). History of Romania: Compendium. Romanian Cultural Institute (Center for Transylvanian Studies). pp. 59–132. ISBN 978-973-7784-12-4.
- Pană Dindelegan, Gabriela (2013). "Introduction: Romanian – a brief presentation". In Pană Dindelegan, Gabriela (ed.). The Grammar of Romanian. Oxford University Press. pp. 1–7. ISBN 978-0-19-964492-6.
- Parker, Henry Michael Denne (1958). A history of the Roman world from A.D. 138 to 337. Methuen Publishing. ISBN 978-0-416-43690-7.
- Pârvan, Vasile (1926). Getica (in Romanian and French). București, Romania: Cvltvra Națională.
- Pârvan, Vasile (1928). Dacia. CUP.
- Parvan, Vasile; Florescu, Radu (1982). Getica. Editura Meridiane.
- Parvan, Vasile; Vulpe, Alexandru; Vulpe, Radu (2002). Dacia. Editura 100+1 Gramar. ISBN 978-9-735-91361-8.
- Petolescu, Constantin C (2000). Inscriptions de la Dacie romaine: inscriptions externes concernant l'histoire de la Dacie (Ier-IIIe siècles). Enciclopedica. ISBN 978-9-734-50182-3.
- Petrucci, Peter R. (1999). Slavic Features in the History of Rumanian. LINCOM EUROPA. ISBN 978-3-89586-599-2.
- Poghirc, Cicerone (1989). Thracians and Mycenaeans: Proceedings of the Fourth International Congress of Thracology Rotterdam 1984. Brill Academic Pub. ISBN 978-9-004-08864-1.
- Pop, Ioan Aurel (1999). Romanians and Romania: A Brief History. East European monographs. East European Monographs. ISBN 978-0-88033-440-2.
- Roesler, Robert E. (1864). Das vorromische Dacien. Academy, Wien, XLV.
- Russu, I. Iosif (1967). Limba Traco-Dacilor ('Thraco-Dacian language') (in Romanian). Editura Stiintifica.
- Russu, I. Iosif (1969). Die Sprache der Thrako-Daker ('Thraco-Dacian language') (in German). Editura Stiintifica.
- Sălăgean, Tudor (2005). "Romanian Society in the Early Middle Ages (9th–14th Centuries AD)". In Pop, Ioan-Aurel; Bolovan, Ioan (eds.). History of Romania: Compendium. Romanian Cultural Institute (Center for Transylvanian Studies). pp. 133–207. ISBN 978-973-7784-12-4.
- Schmitz, Michael (2005). The Dacian threat, 101–106 AD. Armidale, NSW: Caeros. ISBN 978-0-975-84450-2.
- Schütte, Gudmund (1917). Ptolemy's maps of northern Europe: a reconstruction of the prototypes. H. Hagerup.
- Southern, Pat (2001). The Roman Empire from Severus to Constantin. Routledge. ISBN 978-0-203-45159-5.
- Spinei, Victor (1986). Moldavia in the 11th–14th Centuries. Editura Academiei Republicii Socialiste Româna.
- Spinei, Victor (2009). The Romanians and the Turkic Nomads North of the Danube Delta from the Tenth to the Mid-Thirteenth century. Koninklijke Brill NV. ISBN 978-90-04-17536-5.
- Stoica, Vasile (1919). The Roumanian Question: The Roumanians and their Lands. Pittsburgh: Pittsburgh Printing Company. Archived from the original on 27 July 2021.
- Taylor, Timothy (2001). Northeastern European Iron Age pages 210–221 and East Central European Iron Age pages 79–90. Springer Published in conjunction with the Human Relations Area Files. ISBN 978-0-306-46258-0.
- Tomaschek, Wilhelm (1883). Les Restes de la langue dace (in French). Belgium: Le Muséon.
- Tomaschek, Wilhelm (1893). Die alten Thraker (in German). Vol. 1. Vienna: Tempsky.
- Van Den Gheyn, Joseph (1886). "Les populations danubiennes: études d'ethnographie comparée" [The Danubian populations: comparative ethnographic studies]. Revue des questions scientifiques (in French). 17–18. Brussels: Société scientifique de Bruxelles. ISSN 0035-2160.
- Vékony, Gábor (2000). Dacians, Romans, Romanians. Toronto and Buffalo: Matthias Corvinus Publishing. ISBN 978-1-882785-13-1.
- Vico, Giambattista; Pinton, Giorgio A. (2001). Statecraft: The Deeds of Antonio Carafa. Peter Lang Pub Inc. ISBN 978-0-8204-6828-0.
- Waldman, Carl; Mason, Catherine (2006). Encyclopedia of European Peoples. Infobase Publishing. ISBN 1438129181.
- Westropp, Hodder M. (2003). Handbook of Egyptian, Greek, Etruscan and Roman Archeology. Kessinger Publishing. ISBN 978-0-766-17733-8.
- White, David Gordon (1991). Myths of the Dog-Man. University of Chicago. ISBN 978-0-226-89509-3.
- Zambotti, Pia Laviosa (1954). I Balcani e l'Italia nella Preistori (in Italian). Como.
- Zumpt, Karl Gottlob; Zumpt, August Wilhelm (1852). Eclogae ex Q. Horatii Flacci poematibus page 140 and page 175 by Horace. Philadelphia: Blanchard and Lea.
