= Borani (tribe) =

Ancient tribe of Dacia

The Borani (Greek: Βορανοί, romanized: Boranoi, Anglicized: Borans) (or Boradi, romanized: Boradoi as called by St. Gregory Thaumaturgus) were a tribe whose ethnicity is debated (though probably Sarmatian or Scythian) that dwelt on the Ister. They were mentioned by the Greek historian Zosimus in his work New History alongside the Goths, Carpi and Urugundi. And by St. Gregory Thaumaturgus in his work Epistola Canonica.

== Ethnicity and connections to other tribes ==
The most commonly proposed theory among western historians is that the Borani is a Scytho-Sarmatian tribe.

The Borani were equated to the Bulanes (Βούλανες) by William Smith, and Johann Kaspar Zeuß. The Bulanes were a tribe that lived east of the Vistula near the Gutones, though William Smith says that a connection of the Bulanes to the Selonians is more likely since other manuscripts call the Bulanes Sulones. Or if the correct reading is Bulanes, a connection with the Polans instead. Along with this. Some have equated the Bulanes with the Borusci of Ptolemy. This led to Uldastov to believe in a Slavic origin for the Borani, which was a popular idea during the first half 20th century.

Remennikov agreed with a Slavic origin though he’d also proposed a connection with the Germanic Buri, or with the Bulanes. Considering them to be Scythian, Sarmatian, Alanic, or Slavic. Gapusenko proposed the Borani to be connected to the Polans, and the Borusci. And Pioro identified the Borani with the Germanic Varini. This identification has been both proposed as unlikely and promising. But Vasiliev supposed that the connection was not that they were of the same tribe, but they both were militaristic or defensive. And the name came from the Scandinavian word Vaeria meaning to protect or defend. Due to this ethnonym Vasiliev supposed the Borani were the Germanic guards of the Bosporan Kings.

Levada had proposed that the Borani were the Batavians since Ammianus reports that the Batavians and Herulians in the Roman army always acted together. And the Herulians and Borani were both closely related to the Goths. Shchukin supported both a connection with the Buri, and the Varini.

Moritz Schönfeld says that the Borani were a non-Germanic people with a non-Germanic name.

Another proposed theory is that the name “Borani” means “people from the north” and refers to newly arrived Goths, and possibly some Heruli. Though St. Gregory Thaumaturgus, a first hand account differentiates them.

== History ==
=== 1st recorded campaign ===
The Borani are first recorded by Zosimus as having crossed the Danube and raided Moesia in the summer of 250 CE. With allied tribes like the Goths led by Cniva, and the Carpi. Though exact details of their role in this campaign is unclear.

=== 251 CE - 256 CE ===
Once again in 251 CE the Goths, Borani, Urugundi, and Carpi terrified the people who lived in the Roman Balkans, and then laid waste to the lands up to the sea. Then later in the year taking advantage of the Trebonianus Gallus’ Inability to defend the Empire. They once again plundered Roman cities taking all that was left. Before crossing into Asia plundering Cappadocia, Pessinus, and Ephesus. This was until 253 CE when Aemilianus the commander of the Pannonian or Moesian legions and future emperor had boosted the morale of his troops, allowing him to surprise the invading tribes and defeating them. This victory led his army to proclaim Aemilianus as emperor who would then march to Italy and proclaim himself Roman emperor. Later in 253 CE the tribes put Thessalonica in danger, which also made the Athenians rebuild their walls that were destroyed by Sulla. And the Peloponnesians fortify their isthmus out of fear. In 256 CE or 257 CE the Goths, Urugundi, Carpi, and Borani pillaged Italy and Illyricum without opposition.

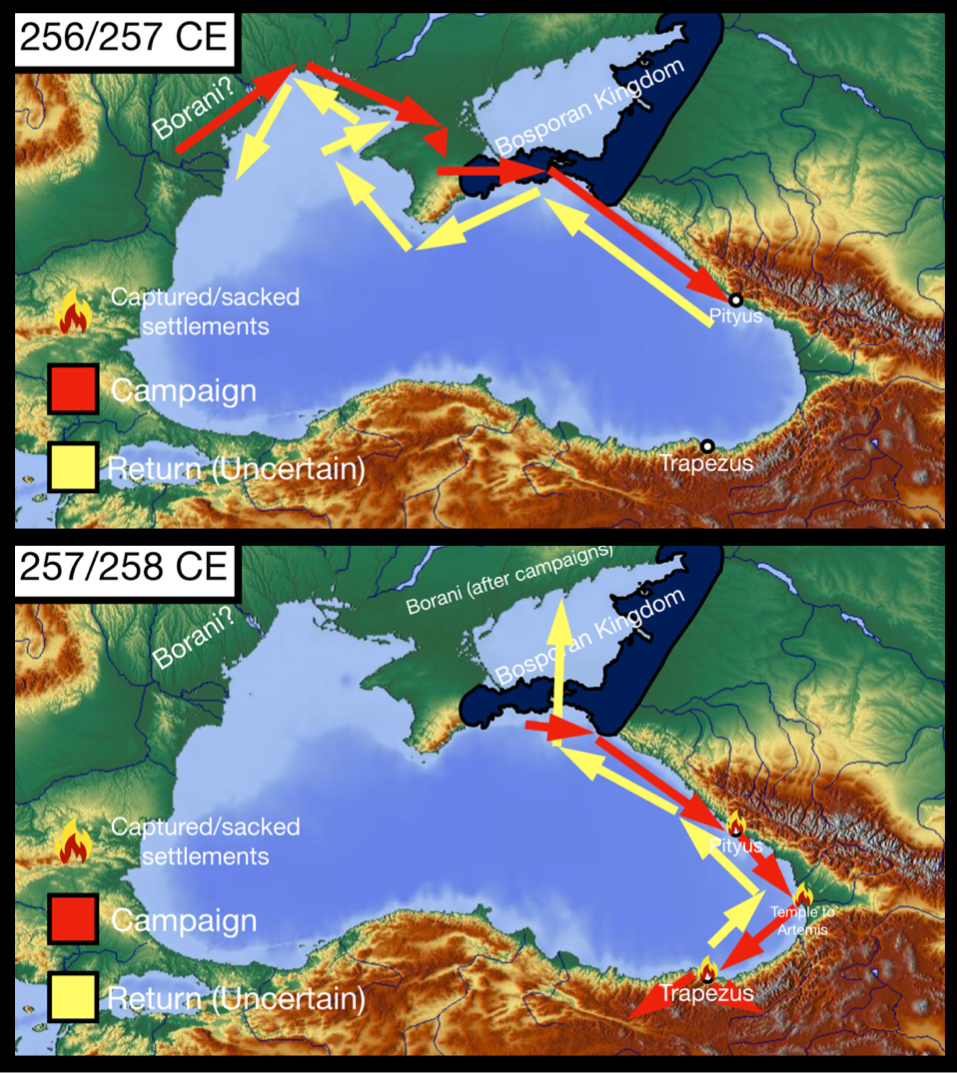
Map of the Borani’s 1st and 2nd campaigns (though original location is uncertain)

=== 1st Campaign into Minor Asia of 256 CE or 257 CE ===
According to Zosimus in 256 CE or 257 CE the Borani crossed the Cimmerian Bosporus (Strait of Kerch) into geographical Asia. This action was said to have been done easily since out of fear the Bosporan Kingdom supplied the Borani with vessels and guided them in the passage. While Zosimus only mentions the Borani as having taken part in this campaign St. Gregory Thaumaturgus also notes the Goths also raided.

Due to the movement of the Borani and Goths, many inhabitants of the Black Sea coast fled to Roman forts for their lives. Although piracy was a long-standing tradition in this region. And the Borani had the same objectives as pirates, for riches to plunder. This was still threatening to the region's inhabitants since the Borani and Goths were two entire tribes.

The Borani and Goths sailed up to Pityus, a Caucasian city founded by Greek colonists. This was the most remote point of Roman control along the Black Sea, which the Romans only had subpar control over. Yet despite this the Romans were able to drive the two tribes away along with killing them in mass numbers, due to a general who was good at defence, named Successianus. The Borani and Goths fearing that more Romans would come to aid Pityus, decided to withdraw.

In their withdrawal the Borani and Goths couldn't have used Bosporan ships, since they had already sailed back to the Bosporan Kingdom. Instead they had to seize all the ships they could find along the coast to sail home. Although Zosimus never explicitly mentions it, they probably seized men to sail these ships, due to their naval inabilities.

=== 2nd Campaign into Minor Asia 257 or 258 CE ===
In the following year, 257 CE or 258 CE the Borani and Goths launched another campaign. This time they were able to secure ships from the Bosporan Kingdom. And like last time they attacked Pityus. Though Successianus was sent to Syria by Valerian, and elevated to Praetorian Prefect due to his victory against the Borani and Goths in the year prior. Due to this the two tribes were able to successfully take Pityus.

After the capture of Pityus the Borani and Goths continued sailing southwards across the Black Sea. They attacked a temple of Artemis at the mouth of the River Phasis. And they continued to sail up to Trapezus. The city of Trapezus had two sets of walls, along with this their normal garrison of unknown numbers was strengthened with an extra 10,000 men. Despite this the Romans wanting pay over anything didn't properly man the walls, not even climbing lookout posts. The two tribes took advantage of this, and they cut down trees and used them to scale the walls of Trapezus at night. They took the city and killed its inhabitants and plundered the city. Giving them plenty of riches. After this the Borani spread out and began plundering the region of Pontus.

The success from this campaign inspired the Goths to do the same who built their own boats and sailed down Thrace and Moesia while their army moved parallel to the fleet.

==== In Pontus ====
St. Gregory Thaumaturgus, was the bishop of Neocaesarea since about 240 CE. He had fled to the mountains to escape the Decian Persecution. By the mid-250’s he had become the leading Christian of the Roman Pontus. He wrote a letter in 262, probably to another bishop, documenting the bad actions of the Christians of the region during and after the invasion of Pontus by the Borani and Goths. Some Christians were said to have stolen what was left after the invasion, such as buried silver, livestock, and fields to compensate their losses. Some people who escaped captivity from the tribes, asked for support from some Christians, yet the Christians had allegedly detained them and forced the captives to work for them, while others helped the Borani and Goths locate houses, and execute Romans; and some even plundered houses of people who fled before the Borani could do so.

=== After the Asiatic Campaigns ===
Between the Middle Dnieper and the Upper Southern Bug, and in the Middle Dniester. There is a high concentration of Roman coins, minted from regions such as Moesia, Macedon, Thrace, Dacia, Bithynia, Mysia, Troad, and Ionia. On the other hand the east of the Dnieper, in the Dnieper-Donets-Forest-Steppe, has coinage minted in Pontus, Paphlagonia, and Cappadocia. The majority of those coins that are east of the Dneiper came from the city of Trapezus.

While an explanation of these coins could be from trade, this seems to be unlikely. And more probably they were caused by Military activity. This narrative lines up with that of the Borani. And this suggests that after their 2nd raid, they had settled between the Dnieper and Donets near the Bosporan Kingdom, rather than their original homeland.

== Location ==
According to Johann Kaspar Zeuß the Borani originally settled between the Bug and the Vistula along with the Amadoci and the Costobocci. Before migrating south to the coast alongside the Goths, this location was proposed on the assumption the Bulanes of Ptolemy were equivalent to the Borani. Other sources place them southwest of the Carpi on the northeastern bank of the Danube. Which lines up with the claim by Zosimus that they were dwelling along the Ister. Scheel Philologus places them south of the Buri. Another theory is that they lived in Southern Russia or Ukraine near the Goths. While this isn’t on the Ister, it explains how they could’ve easily gone to the Bosporan Kingdom. If this is the case then the Urugundi could possibly be the same as the Urgi of Strabo.
