= Duripshi =

Town in Abkhazia

Duripshi დურიფში (Georgian) Дәрыҧшь (Abkhaz)
- Location in Abkhazia
- Interactive map of Duripshi
- Location in Georgia Location in Abkhazia
- Coordinates: 43°11′57″N 40°38′13″E
- Country: Georgia
- Partially recognized independent country: Abkhazia
- District: Gudauta

Population (2011)
  - Total: 2,214
- Time zone: UTC+3 (MSK)
- Area code: +7 840
- Climate: Cfa

Duripshi (Georgian: დურიფში; Abkhaz: Дәрыҧшь), also known as Duripsh, is a village in the Gudauta district of the partially recognized Republic of Abkhazia, according to the administrative division of Georgia, in the Gudauta municipality of the Autonomous Republic of Abkhazia.

== History ==
The village has long been inhabited by the clans of Lakrba, Gunba, Tarba, Tvanba, Tarkil, Tania, Ardzinba, Arsalia, and Gerzmava. At the beginning of the nineteenth century, representatives of the Kvaratskhelia clan moved to Duripshi from south-eastern Abkhazia. Subsequently, mainly in the period of 1870–1920, representatives of the following families settled in the village of Duripshi: Agrba, Khagba, Agumaa, Abgaj, Sakania, Gamisonia, Konjaria, Khalvash, Gitsba, Smyr, Chuaz, Khuporia, Gubaz, Bartsits, Tskua, Shulumba, Kobakhia, Eshba, Pkin, Anba, Ketsba, Beniya, Kvadzba, Barzania, Papba, Bigvava, Gabunia, Antelava, Khagush, Khalia, Hetsia, Lasaria, Emukhvari, Kudzhba, Chepia, Gugunava, Vardania, Tsargush, and Tyrkba.

In the late 1800s most of the population was forcibly exiled to Turkey after the Russo-Turkish War (1877–1878). About 50 people remained from a population of 1,500.

The village of Duripshi was historically divided into six settlements (Abkhaz: Abqabla): Abgara, Aguhara, Aryuta, Attarkhabla, Ebyrnykha, and Twanaarchu.

In 2012, the Federal Security Service (FSB) found a huge arms cache belonging to Doku Umarov in Duripshi.

== Population ==
According to the census of 1886, 843 people lived in the village of Duripshi, all of which were Abkhazians.

By the 1959 census, 2767 people lived in the village of Duripshi, mainly Abkhazians.

According to the 2011 census, the population of the rural settlement (rural administration) of Duripshi was 2214 inhabitants, of which 98.1% were Abkhazians (2171 people), 0.8% were Russians (17 people), 0.3% were Georgians (6 people), 0.2% were Ukrainians (4 people), 0.1% were Mingrelians (3 people), 0.1% were Armenians (2 people), and 0.5% were of other ethnicities (11 people).

Year of the census	Number of inhabitants	Ethnic composition
1886	843	Abkhazian 100%
1926	1605	Abkhazian 96.3%; Georgian 0.9%; Russian 0.6%
1959	2767	Abkhazian (no exact data)
1989	2699	Abkhazian (no exact data)
2011	2214	Abkhazian (98.1%); Russian (0.8%); Georgian (0.3%); Ukrainian (0.2%); Mingrelian (0.1%); Armenian (0.1%); other ethnicities (0.5%)

== Attractions ==
The village has objects important to the historical and cultural heritage of Abkhazia:

- A site of a primitive man belonging to the Mousterian era. This site is located on the second terrace of the left bank of the Hypsta River near the village of Duripshi.
- A fortress from the Middle Ages. It is located at the confluence of the Hypsta and Egra rivers, opposite the Duripshi hydroelectric power station.
- A church from the Middle Ages.
- An obelisk to the victims of the repression of 1937, the fallen soldiers in the war of 1941-1945, and the Patriotic War of the people of Abkhazia of 1992-1993 from the village of Duripshi. It was installed in 1999
- Bronze Age dolmens.
- A hydroelectric station.
- The Aapsta Falls, 17.2 km (10.7 mi) away from the village.

== Notable residents ==
- Gerzmaa Maya Dzhguatovna, an Abkhazian dancer and soloist of the State Honored Ensemble of Folk Song and Dance of Abkhazia, and the People's Artist of Abkhazia (1985).
- Gitsba Shalva Chifovich, a Soviet and Abkhazian actor, director, and the People's Artist of Abkhazia (1984).
- Razhden Gumba, a Soviet and Abkhazian composer, conductor, and musicologist. Honored Artist of the Georgian SSR (1958), Honored Artist of the Abkhazian ASSR (1970), and the People's Artist of Abkhazia.
- Tarba Nelly Zolotinskovna, an Abkhazian writer, poetess, translator, and publicist. Member of the Union of Writers of Abkhazia (since 1957), member of the Union of Writers of the USSR, and a member of the Union of Writers of the Russian Federation. An Honored Worker of Culture of Abkhazia.
- Viacheslav Eshba, a military officer and politician.
- Dmitry Dbar, a member of the People's Assembly of Abkhazia.
- Edlar Chitanava, an assassin in the July 2007 and the February 2012 assassination attempts on Alexander Ankvab.
- Rushbey Bartsits, an assassin in the July 2007 and the February 2012 assassination attempts on Alexander Ankvab.
- Guram Gumba, chairman of the Committee for Inter-Parliamentary and Foreign Affairs from 2007 - 2012.
- Pavel Ardzinba, a businessman.
- Guram Barganjia, a member of the 5th convocation of the People's Assembly of Abkhazia.
- Khamzat Gitsba, a participant in the 1996 hijacking of the MV Avrazya.
- Kesou Khagba, representative of the President of Abkhazia in Ukraine from 1992 to 1995, co-founder of the newspaper Novy Den, and the Minister of Culture from 1995 to 1999.
- Beslan Ardzinba, a politician.
- Beslan Khalvash, a member of the People's Assembly of Abkhazia.
- Dzhugelia Astamur, a member of Apsny.
- Valeri Gurjua, a member of the People's Assembly of Abkhazia.
- Madan Sakaniya, a centenarian.

== Nearby areas ==
Locality	Latitude	Longitude	Distance	Bearing
New Athos Cave (Novoafonskaya Cave; Novyi Afon Cave), New Athos (Novyi Afon; Akhali Atoni), Gudauta District, Abkhazia, Georgia	43° 5' 26" N	40° 48' 36" E	19.3 km (12.0 miles)	131.2° (SE)
Kelasuri River gold alluvials, Sukhumi District, Abkhazia, Georgia	43° 10' 33" N	41° 11' 30" E	45.6 km (28.3 miles)	93.9° (E)
Arkhyz deposit, Karachay-Cherkessia, Russia	43° 33' 49" N	41° 16' 50" E	65.9 km (41.0 miles)	52.6° (NE)
Kti-Teberda W deposit, Karachay-Cherkessia, Russia	43° 27' 0" N	41° 28' 0" E	72.9 km (45.3 miles)	67.8° (ENE)
Dombai, Karachay-Cherkessia, Russia	43° 17' 21" N	41° 37' 24" E	80.9 km (50.3 miles)	83.0° (E)
Urup Cu Deposit, Karachay-Cherkessia, Russia	43° 56' 35" N	41° 9' 25" E	92.4 km (57.4 miles)	27.1° (NNE)
Mount Tkhach (Bolshoy Tkhach southwest slope; Upper Bolshoy Sakhray Valley), Maykopsky District, Adygea (Republic of Adygea), Russia	44° 2' 15" N	40° 25' 9" E	94.1 km (58.5 miles)	349.7° (N)
Belorechenskoe deposit, Maykopsky District, Adygea (Republic of Adygea), Russia	44° 9' 14" N	40° 10' 49" E	111.5 km (69.3 miles)	341.2° (NNW)
Unnamed Quarry No. 1, Karachay-Cherkessia, Russia	43° 59' 6" N	41° 42' 4" E	122.3 km (76.0 miles)	44.5° (NE)
El'brusskiy Pb-Zn mine (Elbrusskii mine; Elbrussky mine), Elbrussky (Elbrus), Karachayevsk City District, Karachay-Cherkessia, Russia	43° 34' 18" N	42° 8' 3" E	128.1 km (79.6 miles)	70.9° (ENE)
Kirari Au deposit, Mestia District, Samegrelo-Zemo Svaneti, Georgia	43° 3' 14" N	42° 14' 47" E	132.2 km (82.1 miles)	96.8° (E)
Lakhamula Au deposit, Mestia District, Samegrelo-Zemo Svaneti, Georgia	43° 3' 56" N	42° 15' 46" E	133.3 km (82.8 miles)	96.1° (E)
Lukhra Au deposit, Mestia District, Samegrelo-Zemo Svaneti, Georgia	43° 1' 55" N	42° 22' 33" E	143.0 km (88.8 miles)	97.1° (E)
Elbrus caldera, Elbrussky District, Kabardino-Balkaria, Russia	43° 20' 58" N	42° 26' 22" E	147.3 km (91.5 miles)	83.1° (E)
Elbrus Mt, Kabardino-Balkaria, Russia	43° 21' 17" N	42° 26' 21" E	147.3 km (91.5 miles)	82.9° (E)
Mount Cheget, Elbrussky District, Kabardino-Balkaria, Russia	43° 14' 43" N	42° 27' 51" E	148.6 km (92.3 miles)	87.7° (E)
Bechasyn plateau, Karachay-Cherkessia, Russia	43° 37' 2" N	42° 26' 56" E	153.9 km (95.6 miles)	72.0° (ENE)
Guli Au deposit, Mestia District, Samegrelo-Zemo Svaneti, Georgia	43° 4' 23" N	42° 36' 33" E	161.2 km (100.2 miles)	94.5° (E)
Adzharo-Trialetskaya, Guria, Georgia	41° 58' 0" N	42° 1' 0" E	178.4 km (110.9 miles)	140.0° (SE)
Prometei cave, Kustanavi, Imereti, Georgia	42° 22' 36" N	42° 35' 52" E	185.1 km (115.0 miles)	119.2° (ESE)
Armavir city, Krasnodar Krai, Russia	45° 0' 0" N	41° 7' 0" E	203.3 km (126.3 miles)	10.8° (N)
Merisi Mining District, Adjara, Georgia	41° 34' 38" N	42° 0' 8" E	213.2 km (132.5 miles)	147.6° (SSE)
Sivrikaya Deposit, Hopa Camp, Hopa District, Artvin Province, Turkey	41° 21' 35" N	41° 21' 26" E	213.7 km (132.8 miles)	163.5° (SSE)
Peronit Deposit, Hopa Camp, Hopa District, Artvin Province, Turkey	41° 21' 42" N	41° 22' 44" E	214.0 km (133.0 miles)	163.0° (SSE)
Konaklı Deposit, Hopa Camp, Hopa District, Artvin Province, Turkey	41° 19' 46" N	41° 19' 59" E	216.4 km (134.5 miles)	164.3° (SSE)
Pınarlı Deposit, Hopa Camp, Hopa District, Artvin Province, Turkey	41° 21' 0" N	41° 25' 36" E	216.4 km (134.5 miles)	162.1° (SSE)
Kutonit Deposit, Hopa Camp, Hopa District, Artvin Province, Turkey	41° 19' 50" N	41° 21' 2" E	216.7 km (134.6 miles)	163.9° (SSE)
Güneşli Deposit, Hopa Camp, Hopa District, Artvin Province, Turkey	41° 18' 33" N	41° 21' 7" E	219.0 km (136.1 miles)	164.0° (SSE)
Yolgeçen Deposit, Yolgeçen Camp, Arhavi District, Artvin Province, Turkey	41° 16' 28" N	41° 18' 43" E	221.9 km (137.9 miles)	165.1° (SSE)
Mağara Deposit, Yolgeçen Camp, Arhavi District, Artvin Province, Turkey	41° 16' 32" N	41° 19' 53" E	222.2 km (138.0 miles)	164.7° (SSE)

== Literature ==
- (Russian) Kvarchia V. E. Historical and modern toponymy of Abkhazia (Historical and etymological research). — Sukhum: Dom pechati, 2006. 328 p
- (abh.) Кәарҷиа В. Е. Aqsny atoponymy. — Аҟәа: 2002. — 686 d

== Economy ==
Duripshi has an important role in tea production in Abkhazia.

== Education ==
There is a high school in the village. Famous alumni and staff include Pavel Ardzinba, Khamzat "Rocky" Gitsba, and Beslan Ardzinba.

== Sport ==
Duripshi FC is the town's football team in the Abkhazian Cup; they participated in the semifinals of the 1994 tournament. In 2022, the World Abaza Congress organized a sport program in the village.

== Culture ==
Every November, an annual harvest festival is held nearby in Lykhny. In 2023, the World Abaza Congress made a cultural Youth Program in the village. There are many cafes in the town, such as Абхазское Застолье у семьи Кокоскерия. There is also a horse-riding ground in the town.

== Flora and Fauna ==
Trees such as yew and boxwood are part of the local plant life. Fauna includes the Caucasian parsley frog and Brauner's rock lizard, which both live near the village. Nearby parks include the Ritsa Relic National Park and the Pitsunda Pine Grove.

In 2019, a new species, Troglaphorura gladiator, was discovered 10 km away from Duripshi.

== Tourism ==
There is a hotel and resort in the town.

== Geology ==
Duripshi is located on a plateau. Cave systems, such as the Snezhnaya cave system, are a common appearance too.
