= Carpi (people) =

European tribe (2nd-4th centuries)

- Ethnicity: Disputed (Dacian, Sarmatian, Thracian, Slavic, Germanic, Baltic, Celtic)
- Language: Unknown (no direct evidence)

The Carpi or Carpiani were a tribe that resided in the eastern parts of modern Romania in the historical region of Moldavia from no later than c. AD 140 and until at least AD 318.

The ethnic affiliation of the Carpi remains disputed, as there is no direct evidence in the surviving ancient literary sources. A strong body of modern scholarly opinion considers that the Carpi were a tribe of the Dacian nation. Other scholars have linked the Carpi to a variety of ethnic groups, including Sarmatians, Thracians, Slavs, Germanic peoples, Balts and Celts.

About a century after their earliest mention by Ptolemy, during which time their relations with Rome appear to have been peaceful, the Carpi emerged in c. 238 as among Rome's most persistent enemies. In the period AD 250–270, the Carpi were an important component of a loose coalition of transdanubian barbarian tribes that also included Germanic and Sarmatian elements. These were responsible for a series of large and devastating invasions of the Balkan regions of the empire which nearly caused its disintegration in the "Crisis of the Third Century".

In the period 270–318, the Roman "military emperors" acted to remove the Carpi threat to the empire's borders. Multiple crushing defeats were inflicted on the Carpi in 273, 297, 298-308 and in 317. After each, massive numbers of Carpi were forcibly transferred by the Roman military to the Roman province of Pannonia (modern western Hungary) as part of the emperors' policy of repopulating the devastated Danubian provinces with surrendered barbarian tribes. Since the Carpi are no longer mentioned in known documents after 318, it is possible that the Carpi were largely removed from the Carpathian region by c. 318 or, if any remained, it is possible that they mingled with other peoples resident or immigrating into Moldavia, such as the Sarmatians or Goths.

== Name etymology ==
The Greco-Romans called this people the Carpi or Carpiani. Probably the earliest mention of them, under the name Καρπιανοί (Carpiani in Latin) is in the Geographia of the 2nd-century Greek geographer Ptolemy, composed c. AD 140.

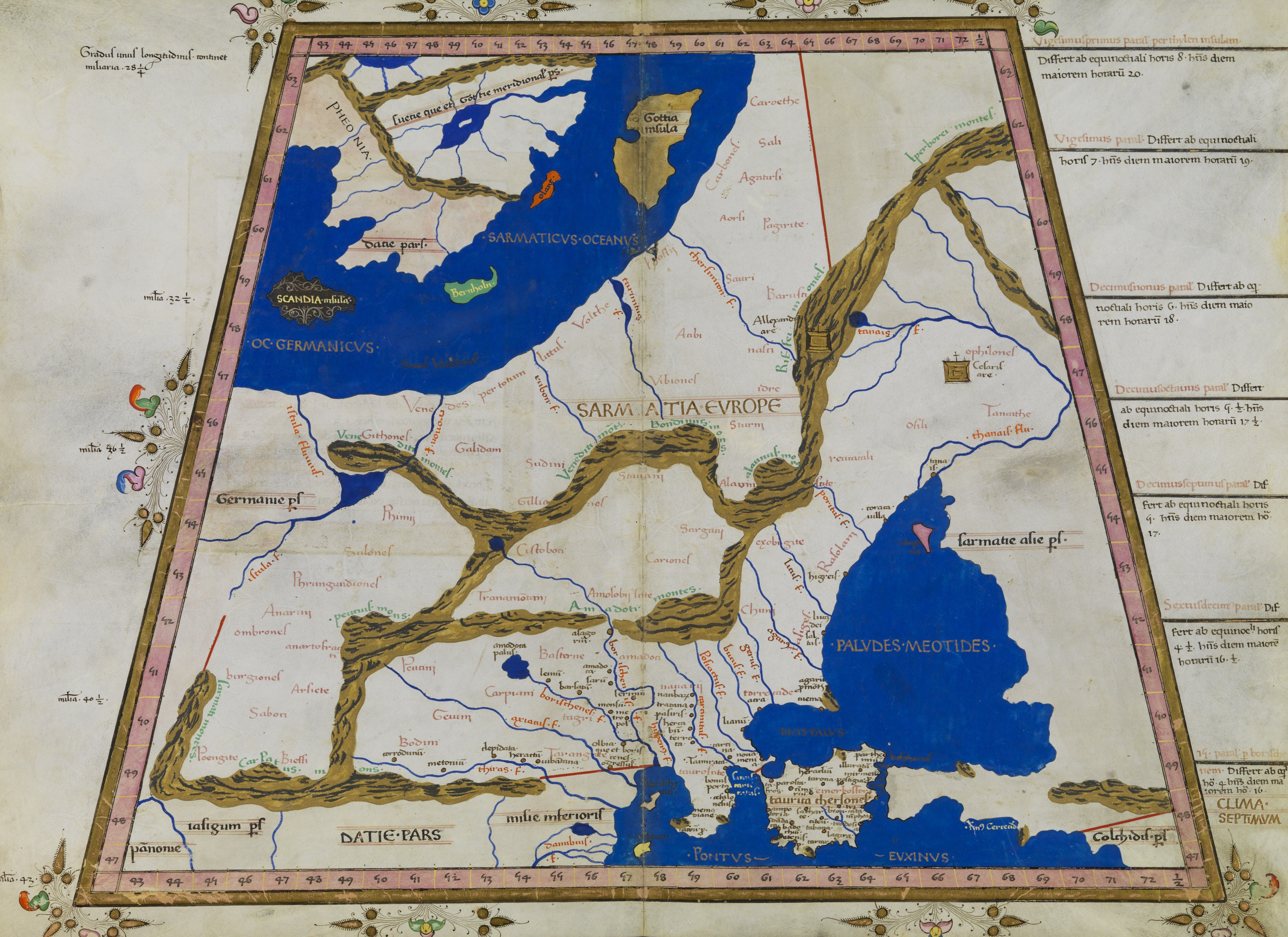
Carpiani on a 1467 map based on Ptolemy's Geographia

The name Carpi or Carpiani may derive from the same root as the name of the Carpathian mountain range that they occupied, also first mentioned by Ptolemy under the name Καρπάτης - Karpátēs. The root may be the putative Proto-Indo-European word *ker/sker, meaning "peak" or "cliff" (cf. Lithuanian karpyti "mountain peaks looking like a saw", Albanian karpë "rock", Romanian (ş)carpă "precipice", Sanskrit kar "cut", and Latin scarpa, cfr. Italian scarpata, English escarpment). Scholars who support this derivation are divided between those who believe the Carpi gave their name to the mountain range (i.e. the name means "mountains of the Carpi") and those who claim the reverse. In the latter case, Carpiani could mean simply "people of the Carpathians". But the similarity between the two names may be coincidence, and they may derive from different roots. For example, it has been suggested that the name may derive from the Slavic root-word krepu meaning "strong" or "brave".

Romanian scholar Vasile Pârvan considered that the following peoples recorded in ancient sources correspond to Ptolemy's Karpiani:

- the Kallipidai mentioned in the Histories of Herodotus (composed around 430 BC) as residing in the region of the river Borysthenes (Dnieper)
- the Karpídai around the mouth of the river Tyras (Dniester) recorded in a fragment of Pseudo-Scymnus (composed c. 90 BC)
- the Harpii, located near the Danube Delta, mentioned by Ptolemy himself.

If so, their locations could imply that the Carpi had very gradually migrated westwards in the period 400 BC - AD 140, a view championed by Kahrstedt. These names' common element carp- appears frequently in Dacian and Thracian placenames and personal names. But there is no consensus that these groups are in fact Carpi. Bichir suggests that they were Thraco-Dacian tribes distantly related to the Carpi.

== Territory ==
The Barrington Atlas of the Greek and Roman World places the Carpi between the river Hierasus (Siret) and the river Porata (Prut)

However, it is not possible to reliably define the territories of these groups due to the imprecision of the ancient geographical sources. Also, it is likely that in many areas, ethnic groups overlapped and the ethnic map was a patchwork of dispersed sub-groups. The Sarmatians and Bastarnae are attested, in both literature and archaeology, all over Wallachia, Moldavia and Bessarabia. It is likely that, when Greco-Roman sources refer to conflicts with the Costoboci, Carpi or Goths, they are referring to coalitions of different groups under the currently hegemonic tribe. Given the Carpi's repeated raids South of the Danube and clashes with the Romans during the 3rd century, it is likely by ca. 230, the Carpi had extended their hegemony over eastern Wallachia, previously dominated by the Roxolani.

== Material culture ==
There is no dispute among scholars that some Decebalic-era Dacian settlements in Moldavia (mostly west of the Siret, with a few on the east bank (including Piroboridava, identified with Poiana-Tecuci), were abandoned by 106, most likely, according to Bichir, as a result of the Roman conquest of Dacia. From this time, Bichir identifies two distinct cultures in Moldavia, existing side by side. One, a sedentary culture, labelled "Daco-Carpic" by Bichir, started around 106 and disappeared around 318; A smaller culture displayed characteristics usually associated with nomadic peoples from the Eurasian steppes, labelled "Sarmatian" by Bichir.

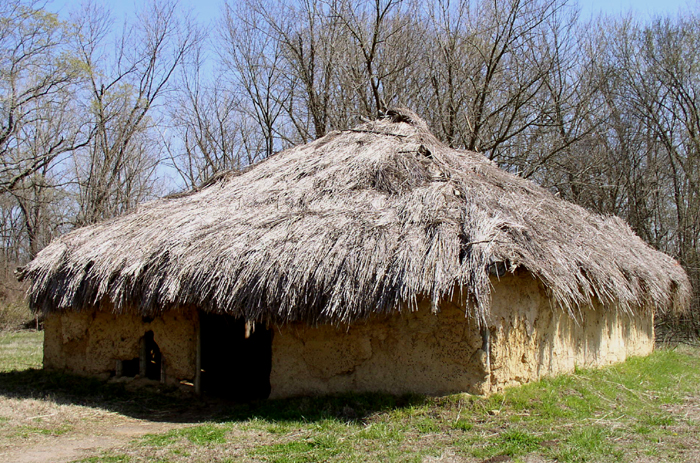
Wattle and daub house

By 1976, 117 sedentary settlements had been identified, the great majority (89) located West of the Siret (thus inside Dacia's borders as defined by Ptolemy). The inhabitants lived in both surface-dwellings and sunken-floor huts. The single-roomed surface-dwellings were made of wattle and beaten-earth, usually of rectangular or square form, varying from 9 sq m to 30 sq m in size. Each contained a clay hearth placed at the centre of the dwelling. The more numerous sunken-earth huts are usually of oval or round shape. The sedentary people generally cremated their dead, both adults and children, according to Bichir: all the 43 purely "Daco-Carpic" (sedentary) cemeteries used only cremation. The ashes from the cremation were, in the great majority of cases, buried inside urns. Some graves contained grave-goods, but no weapons other than a single dagger. Mundane goods include knives, keys, and belt-buckles; valuable goods include Sarmatian-style mirrors, silver ear-rings, gold pendants and beads.

Pottery found in sedentary sites includes the hand-made "porous" type, grey wheel-made ware, red-fired pottery and imported Roman ware. Bichir describes the first two as continuing Dacian La Tène pottery, and points to the presence of the so-called "Dacian cup", a cup of distinctive design, as evidence of a Dacian base to this culture. However, he admits that the pottery also shows Roman and Sarmatian influence. The sedentary folk appear to have been generally illiterate, as no "Daco-Carpic" inscription was ever found during the very intensive excavations carried out in the region.

The sedentary culture did not issue its own coinage. However, Roman coinage circulated "intensely" in the Carpi's territory, according to Bichir. This is based on the large number of coin-hoards found in Moldavia (90), and about 100 isolated coins. However, the circulation of Roman coins seems to have virtually ceased after 218, as no coin-hoards and only 7 isolated coins have been found from after Caracalla, who ruled AD 211–218.

Nomadic-culture graves are predominantly of the inhumation type, found, by 1976, in 38 places in Moldavia. These are predominantly found on the plains, rarely on the Carpathian foothills (i.e. East of the Siret), either singly or in small groups of 2-13 graves, including men, women and children. The great majority of nomadic-culture graves are flat (non-tumular), in contrast to nomadic barrow-graves found from the Dniester region eastwards. However, some secondary barrow-burials (i.e. using pre-existing barrows) have been found, mostly dating from 200 onwards. The nomadic graves always contain grave-goods, often including weapons, and mirrors engraved with tamgas (ritual or tribal symbols associated with nomadic steppe cultures).

Six cemeteries in Bichir's list contain both cremation and inhumation graves. At the Poieneşti site (the only one fully investigated by 1976), 6 adults and 17 children were buried (compared with 62 cremated). Of these, 2 adults and 7 children were found to have artificially elongated crania. This custom, achieved by tightly binding an infant's skull during its early growth phase, is associated with steppe nomads. Bichir identifies the adults as nomads and the children as the progeny of mixed nomad-sedentary marriages.

From the ratio of sedentary to nomadic graves, Bichir concludes that the sedentary folk constituted the majority of the population of Moldavia. In the mixed cemeteries documented by Bichir, nomadic graves constitute about 28% of the total. However, in Moldavia as a whole, nomadic graves represent no more than 1% of all graves.

After 318, according to Bichir, the "Daco-Carpic" culture was in Moldavia replaced by the Sîntana-de-Mureş "variant" of the Chernyakhov culture common to much of the North-Pontic region of south eastern Europe in the period 200–400.

== Ethno-linguistic affiliation ==
There is no direct evidence in surviving Roman imperial era sources, literary or epigraphic, regarding the language of the Carpi. In the near-total absence of inscriptions in the barbaricum, the only valid (though not infallible) indicator of the linguistic affiliation of barbarian peoples are personal names, which can sometimes be ascribed to a linguistic group. However, not a single Carpi personal name is preserved in the surviving ancient sources, other than the name "Carpi" itself, which cannot be ascribed with confidence to any linguistic group.

According to traditional Romanian historiography, as well as to several non-Romanian scholars, the Carpi were a people of the Dacian tongue and culture Heather, who supports this view, suggests that the Carpi name was adopted as the collective name of the Free Dacian tribes when they achieved a degree of political unification in the early 3rd century.

However, a significant number of scholars dispute that the Carpi were ethnic Dacians, and have identified them variously as Sarmatians, Daco-Thracians, Celts, or even proto-Slavs. This is because the region between the rivers Siret and Dniester was of great ethnic diversity during the Roman imperial era, the Barrington Atlas listing Agathyrsi, Bastarnae, Britolagai, Costoboci, Roxolani, Thrakes, and Tyragetae. Also, some modern authors surmise the existence of ethnic groups formed in loco from mixed origins (but mostly with an indigenous Dacian/Sarmatian base e.g. the Goths).

The evidence to support a Dacian identity:

1. Archaeology: Pottery and other artifacts, identified as "Dacian-style" by archaeologists such as Bichir, were discovered at sites in the region of Moldavia presumed inhabited by the Carpi in the period AD 100-300 (e.g. at Poieneşti, near Vaslui) as well as in burial sites. In particular, Bichir points to a cup of unusual design and to the "corded" decoration of pots, as characteristically Dacian. However, determination of the Carpi's ethno-linguistic affiliation using the typology, or by the relative quantity, of finds has been questioned by Niculescu. (Note: Romanian archaeological interpretation: A critique of archaeological interpretation in Romania is contained in an online paper by A-G. Niculescu: Nationalism and the Representation of Society in Romanian Archaeology) Roger Batty concurs that the presence of "Dacian-style" artefacts attests to the material level of the indigenes, but does not prove their ethnicity. These objections reflect modern archaeological theory, which considers that material cultures are not a reliable guide to the ethnic identity, and even less to the language, of the people in question (which may, in any case, have changed over time). (Note: Material culture and ethnicity: The assumption that notional material "cultures", as defined by archaeologists, represent distinct ethnic groups is no longer considered valid in archaeological theory. The traditional approach to archaeological interpretation was defined in the 1920s by Gordon Childe: "We find certain types of remains - pots, implements, ornaments, burial sites, house forms - constantly recurring together. Such a complex of regularly associated traits we shall term a 'cultural group' or just a 'culture'. We assume that such a complex is the material expression of what today would be called a 'people'." But the eminent modern archaeologist Colin Renfrew notes that "since the 1960s, it has been recognised [...] that to equate such notional 'cultures' with peoples is extremely hazardous [...] The notion that such features as pottery decoration are automatically a sign of ethnic affiliation has been challenged". "The traditional explanations rest on assumptions that are easily challenged today. First, there is the notion that archaeological 'cultures' can somehow represent real entities rather than simply the classificatory terms devised for the convenience of the scholar. Second, is the view that ethnic units or 'peoples' can be recognised from the archaeological record by equation with these notional cultures. It is in fact clear that ethnic groups do not always stand out clearly in archaeological remains. Third, it is assumed that when resemblances are noted between the cultural assemblages of one area or another, this can be most readily explained as the result of a migration of people. Of course, migrations did in fact occur, but they are not so easy to document archaeologically as has often been supposed". It is now recognised that the geographical boundaries of material 'cultures' (as discerned by archaeologists) often do not coincide with the territories of ethnic groups, as determined from other evidence. Likewise, it has been demonstrated that several ethnic groups may share a relatively homogeneous material culture while maintaining their distinct ethnic identity. Archaeologists today exercise much greater caution in ascribing ethnic significance to the features and artefacts of a material 'culture'. For example, examination of some early Anglo-Saxon cemeteries in southeastern England suggest that individuals, buried with typical Anglo-Saxon-era assemblages of grave-goods, were indigenes and not immigrants from the other side of the North Sea. The latter, identified by stable isotope ratios, were found buried in the same cemeteries without grave-goods, undermining the entire edifice of Anglo-Saxon ethnic identification. It continues to be accepted that certain cultural customs and artefacts can have ethnic connotations in particular contexts, but pottery styles and decorations are today viewed as among the weakest indicators of ethnicity, because of their transferability between ethnic groups.)
2. Zosimus, a Byzantine chronicler writing around AD 500, records an invasion of Rome's Danubian provinces in 381 by a barbarian coalition of Huns, Sciri and Karpodakai ("Carpo-Dacians"). The latter term has been taken by some scholars as 'proof' of the Carpi's Dacian ethnicity. But this is the only literary evidence linking the Carpi name to that of the Dacians, and Zosimus is regarded by numerous modern scholars as an unreliable chronicler. One historian accords Zosimus "an unsurpassable claim to be regarded as the worst of all the extant Greek historians of the Roman Empire [...] it would be tedious to catalogue all the instances where this historian has falsely transcribed names, not to mention his confusion of events...". In any case, the term is ambiguous. It has also been interpreted as the "Carpi and the Dacians" or "the Carpi mixed with the Dacians". According to the eminent classical scholar Kahrstedt, the term does not refer to the Carpi at all but to Free Dacians, who occupied the territory of the Carpi, after the latter were deported by the Romans. He argues that, in ancient Greek, the first part of the term could only have a geographical meaning: i.e. Karpodakai means "the Dacians from the land of the Carpi". In the same vein, it has also been interpreted as "the Dacians of the Carpathians". (Compare Tyragetae, supposedly meaning "the Getae from the Tyras region"). It is possible that the entire Carpi people were transferred to the Roman empire by 318, which is supported by literary and archaeological evidence: Bichir notes that the culture which he calls "Daco-Carpic" ended in about 318. If so, then Zosimus' Karpodakai could not be referring to the Carpi.
3. Inscription AE (1965) 223 is engraved on the tombstone of Publius Aelius Proculinus, a centurion of the Cohors VII Praetoria (Philippiana) "missed (i.e. killed) in the Dacian War at Castellum Carporum" (bello Dacico desiderato ad castellum Carporum). According to Bichir and others, this refers to the war against the Carpi conducted by emperor Philip the Arab in 246/7, and the castellum Carporum (literally: "fort of the Carpi") is the stronghold of the Carpi, mentioned by Zosimus, where the final battle of the campaign took place. By implication, he argues, this supports the view that the Carpi were Dacians. But other scholars identify the castellum Carporum as a Roman auxiliary fort on the lower Danube, evidenced by the vicus Carporum, a fort-satellite village opposite Carsium (Hârșova, Rom.), mentioned by Ammianus Marcellinus. Cuff argues that Proculinus was actually in command of this fort when he was killed.

A possible argument against Dacian ethnicity is that Roman emperors did not use the long-established imperial victory-title (cognomen ex virtute) Dacicus Maximus (literally: "the greatest Dacian") for victories over the Carpi, but instead adopted the separate title Carpicus Maximus. This was introduced by Philip the Arab in 247, the first Roman emperor to defeat the Carpi in person. Such titles were usually ethnographic, not geographical (i.e. Dacicus meant "victorious over the Dacians", not "victorious in Dacia") The emperors Aurelian and Constantine I claimed both the Dacicus and Carpicus titles. The existence of a separate victory-title for the Carpi may imply that the Romans did not consider the Carpi to be ethnic-Dacians. The same argument may also apply against a Sarmatian or Germanic identity for the Carpi, as Sarmaticus and Germanicus were also established titles in Philip's time. However, the victory-title argument is not conclusive, as 3rd-century emperors used three titles simultaneously to indicate victories against the Iranians, Parthicus ("Victorious over the Parthians"), Medicus ("Medes") and Persicus ("Persians").

IMPERIAL VICTORY TITLES: DACICUS and CARPICUS
Emperor	Dacicus (Maximus) (date)	Carpicus (Maximus) (date)	Specimen inscription*
Trajan	106		AE (1927) 151
Hadrian	118		CIL II.464
Antoninus Pius	157		CIL VIII.20424
Maximinus Thrax	236		AE (1905) 179
Philip the Arab		247	Sear 2581
Trajan Decius	249-51		CIL II.6345
Gallienus	256/7		CIL II.2200
Aurelian	275	272	CIL XIII.8973
Diocletian, Galerius and colleagues		296-305 (5 times)	AE (1959) 290
Galerius		305-11 (6 times)	CIL III.6979
Constantine I	336	317	CIL VI.40776

Note: *Some of the titles above are attested to in multiple inscriptions.

== Conflict with Rome ==
Although the Carpi are recorded as resident in the Dacian region from at least the 140's onwards, they are not mentioned in Roman accounts of several campaigns in the Dacian region in the second century. For example, in Rome's vast and protracted conflict with the trans-danubian tribes, known as the Marcomannic Wars (166-80), during which Dacia province suffered at least two major invasions (167, 170), only their neighbours the Costoboci are mentioned specifically. Silence on the role of the Carpi in these conflicts may imply that they were Roman allies in this period.

Around AD 200 a phase of major population movements started in the European barbaricum (the region outside the borders of the empire). The cause of this dislocation is unknown, but an important factor may have been the Antonine Plague (165-180), a devastating smallpox pandemic, which may have killed 15-30% of the Roman empire's inhabitants. The impact on the barbarian regions would have resulted in many weakened tribes and empty regions that may have induced the stronger tribes to expand. A well-known example is the Goths. These were probably recorded by the Roman historian Tacitus, under the name Gotones, as inhabiting the area East of the Vistula river in central Poland in AD 100. By 250, the Goths had moved South into western Ukraine and were frequently raiding the empire in conjunction with local tribes.

It was in this context of upheaval that, in the middle of the third century, the Carpi emerged as a major barbarian threat to Rome's lower Danubian provinces. They were described by Jordanes as "a race of men very eager to make war, and often hostile to the Romans". A series of major Carpi incursions into the empire are recorded, either alone or in alliance with their neighbouring Sarmatian or Germanic tribes (including Roxolani, Bastarnae, Goths). However, the role of the Carpi in the coalition's incursions is not always clear, as the most comprehensive account, that of the 6th-century chronicler Zosimus, is chronologically confused and often denotes the participants under the vague term "Scythians" (meaning inhabitants of the geographical region called Scythia (i.e. roughly modern Ukraine), not ethnic Scythians).

The involvement of the Carpi in attacks by the Free Dacians into Roman Dacia is also uncertain. Supporters of a Dacian ethnicity for the Carpi have tended to assume that they participated in campaigns where Roman emperors claimed the title Dacicus Maximus, in addition to those resulting in a Carpicus Maximus acclamation. But all incursions in which the Carpi are specifically reported by ancient sources were into Moesia Inferior, not Dacia. The following is a list of recorded incursions in which Carpi participation is specifically attested to by the sources:

=== Carpi attacks on the Danubian frontier (238–250) ===
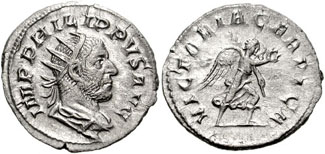
Silver Antoninianus coin issued by the Roman emperor Philip the Arab to commemorate his victory over the Carpi in AD 247. Obverse: Head of Philip wearing diadem, with legend: IMP(erator) PHILIPPVS AVG(ustus); Reverse: Figure of winged goddess Victory bearing palm and laurel wreath, with legend: VICTORIA CARPICA. Mint: Rome. Date: undated, but must have been issued in period 247-9

238: The Carpi launched their first recorded major incursion into Roman territory south of the Danube, during the brief joint rule of the adolescent Gordian III and the senators Balbinus and Pupienus Maximus. This was apparently provoked by the refusal of the governor of Moesia Inferior, Tullius Menophilus, to grant the Carpi's demand for an annual subsidy to keep the peace, as was already paid to the Goths and other tribes on the lower Danube. This lends support to the possibility that, until this time, the Carpi had been long-term allies of the Romans and were aggrieved that they were in effect penalised for their loyalty. However, the governor succeeded in driving out the Carpi in 239.

245–247: During the rule of emperor Philip the Arab (244-249), the Carpi crossed the Danube and laid waste Moesia Inferior. After the theatre governors failed to repel the invasion, the emperor took personal command and launched a major counter-attack. After a prolonged struggle, the Carpi were driven back across the Danube. Pursued by the Romans into their homeland, the main body of Carpi took refuge in a major stronghold (presumably a hillfort), where they were surrounded and besieged by Philip's forces. The remaining Carpi forces, which had scattered, rallied and launched an attempt to relieve the siege. The besieged staged a mass sortie to distract the Romans' attention from the approach of the relief-force. But the latter were intercepted and routed by Philip's equites Maurorum (Berber light cavalry from N. Africa). The breakout itself was contained, forcing the Carpi to sue for peace. This was granted to them on apparently lenient terms by Philip, who was eager to conclude the campaign in time for the forthcoming celebrations of the 1,000th anniversary of the City of Rome's foundation (April 248). Philip was acclaimed Carpicus Maximus.

=== Sarmato-Gothic invasions of the Roman empire (250-270) ===
Map showing the possible role played by the Carpi in the barbarian invasion of 250-251 under the Gothic leader Kniva, which culminated in the defeat and death of emperor Decius (r. 249–51) at the Battle of Abrittus (251). The reconstruction is only tentative, however, as the ancient chroniclers' accounts are fragmentary and confused

250-251: The Carpi participated in a massive transdanubian invasion of Moesia and Thrace under the leadership of the Gothic king Kniva. Kniva's invasion had apparently been provoked by the termination of the Goths' annual Roman subsidy by the emperor Philip. Judging by their actions, the invaders' war aims were limited to pillage: the capture of as many slaves, horses, treasure and other goods as possible to take back to their homelands across the Danube.

Kniva's horde apparently included Goths, Taifali and Vandals, as well as some renegade Roman army veterans. Given Zosimus' description of "Scythians", it almost certainly included Sarmatian elements such as the Roxolani. In addition, an apparently separate force of Goths and Bastarnae also entered Moesia Inferior, led by Kniva's two top lieutenants. Jordanes claims that the barbarians totaled 300,000 men, but Byzantine chroniclers often grossly inflate barbarian numbers, typically by a factor of ten (e.g. Zosimus' claim that 60,000 Alamanni fell at the Battle of Strasbourg in 357, against the 6,000 recorded by the contemporary and more reliable Ammianus Marcellinus). Thus 30,000 is a more plausible, but still formidable, estimate for Kniva's invasion, divided into two divisions. The Carpi contingent numbered 3,000 men, according to Jordanes.

Facing the invasion were the Roman emperor "Trajan" Decius, an experienced general and Philip's commander on the Danube front, who had succeeded his patron after the latter was murdered by mutinous troops in 249, and Caius Trebonianus Gallus, who had been appointed governor of Moesia Superior in the previous year by Decius. It appears that, for the purpose of dealing with the threat, Gallus was given command of forces in the frontier forts along the Danube, while the emperor commanded a mobile force of crack units.

After losing two encounters with the Romans in Moesia Inferior, Kniva surprised the emperor by unobservedly crossing the Haemus (Balkan) mountains into Thracia, which was largely undefended. The emperor, who was left several days' march behind, was obliged to rush his army into Thracia by forced marches. At Beroe (Stara Zagora, Bulgaria), Kniva launched a surprise attack on the emperor's exhausted army, inflicting a major defeat. Decius was obliged to withdraw the remnants of his shattered force to Moesia Inferior and to leave Thracia to be pillaged at will by the barbarians. Kniva's horde stormed the city of Philippopolis (Plovdiv, Bulgaria) and spent the winter of 250/251 in the province.

In the meantime, Decius rebuilt his field army in Moesia Inferior. In 251, as the barbarian army headed home towards the Danube, laden with a vast quantity of plunder, they were intercepted by the emperor at Abrittus in Moesia Inferior. In a hard-fought battle, Kniva's main force was routed. The emperor then led his men across a bog in order to engage Kniva's reserve force, which guarded the barbarians' booty. But the emperor had underestimated the difficulty of the terrain: the Romans became immobilised in the mire and reportedly every one of them perished, including the emperor himself, massacred at long range by Kniva's archers or drowned.

When news of this disaster reached the remaining legions on the Danube, they proclaimed their commander Gallus emperor. The latter concluded a peace with the Goths, which permitted them to return home with their booty intact and guaranteed resumed subsidies. Although Zosimus denounces the terms as shameful, it was probably the only realistic option open to Gallus in the circumstances.

But Gallus' resumption of subsidies did not have the desired effect of sustaining peace on the Danube. Hard on the heels of military catastrophe, the Roman army was crippled by the outbreak of a devastating smallpox pandemic, the so-called Plague of Cyprian (251 - c. 270). The effects of the Cyprianic pandemic are described by Zosimus as even worse than the earlier Antonine outbreak, which probably killed 15-30% of the empire's inhabitants. The Roman army would have suffered heavy casualties as a result of its close concentration of personnel and frequent movements between provinces, thus probably losing about a third of its strength. Taking advantage of Roman military disarray, the transdanubian barbarians launched repeated massive invasions of imperial territory. The exact number, dates and events of these invasions are uncertain due to the confused and fragmentary nature of the sources. It is possible that there were invasions every year and that parts of the Danubian provinces were occupied by marauding bands of barbarians year-round, during the period 251–270. From Zosimus, the following major events may be discerned:

252-253: The Carpi joined Goths and two Sarmatian tribes (the Urugundi and the Borani) in an invasion of Roman territory, ravaging Moesia and Thrace. (Zosimus states that they then crossed into Asia Minor, but as this is inconsistent with the rest of the narrative, it may be a confusion with the invasion of 256). Roman forces on the lower Danube were unable to prevent them from marauding at will, probably due to their losses at Abrittus and the impact of the plague. Eventually, the barbarians were intercepted on their way home by Aemilianus, commander of the army of Pannonia. At first, his men were fearful of engaging the barbarians, because of their aura of invincibility after Abrittus, but Aemilianus' leadership steadied them. At an unknown location near the Danube, the Romans launched a surprise attack and scored a complete victory. They chased the barbarians over the river and deep into their homelands, recovering vast quantities of plunder and liberating thousands of Roman civilians who had been abducted. Possibly among the latter was the C. Valerius Serapio (probably a Greek) who dedicated an undated altar found at Apulum (Alba Iulia) in Roman Dacia, as thanksgiving for his rescue from the Carpi (liberatus a Carpis)

Aemilianus was hailed as emperor by his victorious troops and marched on Rome, where Gallus' forces killed their leader rather than fight against the Danubian army. However, only three months later, Aemilianus was in turn assassinated by the same troops, who defected to Valerian (reigned 253–260), the commander of forces on the Rhine, who had marched into Italy to rescue Gallus.

Valerian was proclaimed emperor and promptly elevated his son Gallienus (reigned 253–268) as Augustus (co-emperor). This father-and-son team presided over the most chaotic period of the empire's history before the 5th century. The empire suffered multiple and massive barbarian invasions on the Rhine, Danube and in the East; at least 11 generals launched military coups; the empire was split into three autonomous pieces; and Valerian himself was captured by the Persians and died after several years in their captivity, the first Roman emperor to suffer such a humiliation.

256-257: The Carpi, with the same allies as in 253, burst into Moesia, ravaged Thrace and lay siege unsuccessfully to Thessalonica in Macedonia. Valerian and Gallienus were obliged to leave the Balkan theatre to subordinates with inadequate forces, as they were fully occupied, the former in the East fighting the Persians, the latter on the Rhine trying to stem a massive Germanic incursion. The whole of Greece was placed on invasion alert: the Athenians rebuilt their city walls for the first time since they were demolished by the republican general Sulla in 87 BC and the Peloponnesians re-fortified the Isthmus of Corinth. The barbarians were eventually routed by Gallienus' lieutenant Aureolus, who brought large numbers of prisoners to Rome.

259-260: "The Scythians, including every people of their country" (i.e. including the Carpi) launched a massive invasion over the Danube, taking advantage of the military and political chaos in the empire. It appears that the barbarians divided into two armies. One invaded Greece and, despite its new walls, succeeded in storming and sacking Athens. The other group crossed Illyricum into Italy, and appeared before the walls of Rome, forcing the Roman Senate to arm the civilian population to man the ramparts, as Gallienus was fully occupied on the Rhine fighting a coup d'état by one of his generals (Postumus). Recognising that there was no possibility of taking the city and sacking it, the Gothic-led host proceeded to ravage the whole of Italy. They were finally driven out by Gallienus' lieutenant Macrianus, who brought the Rhine army into Italy.

Further major "Scythian" invasions took place in 265-266 and possibly the largest of all, 267-268, which was a seaborne invasion which penetrated the Aegean Sea, landed in Macedonia and proceeded to ravage Thrace. However, it was eventually stopped by the emperor Claudius II Gothicus, who destroyed the barbarian host at Naissus (268). Unlike previous invasions, the Carpi are not mentioned specifically by Zosimus and the other chroniclers and their role is thus uncertain.

=== Defeat and resettlement in the Empire (271-318) ===
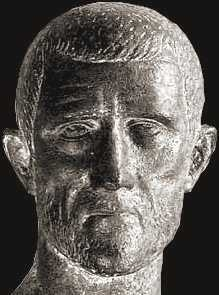
Bust of Roman emperor Aurelian (ruled 270–5), who began the policy of transferring large numbers of Carpi into the Roman empire

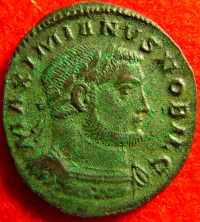
Coin-portrait of the Roman Caesar (deputy emperor) Galerius (Caesar 293–305, Augustus 305–11), nemesis of the Carpi. Galerius scored 4 major victories over the Carpi in 298-305 and a further victory before 311. Legend: MAXIMIANUS NOBIL[issimus] C[aesar] ("The most noble Caesar, Maximianus": Maximianus was one of Galerius' adopted surnames). Bronze follis, issued before 305

The late third century saw the military recovery of the empire under the iron rule of the so-called "Illyrian emperors", a tightly knit group of career soldiers with shared origins in the Danubian provinces and regiments. Their successors, often their descendants, dominated the empire for over a century (268-379). These not only broke the transdanubian tribes on the battlefield, but also pursued a policy of large-scale resettlement of defeated tribespeople in the Danubian provinces of the empire. This was motivated by the need to re-populate the Danubian provinces, which had been ravaged by plague and barbarian invasions during the period 250–270. (Note: Roman resettlement policy: It was a long-established Roman imperial policy, dating from the time of Augustus (ruled 30BC - AD 14), to settle surrendering barbarian communities (dediticii) in the empire, granting them land in return for an obligation of military service much heavier than the usual conscription quota. But the Illyrian emperors pursued this policy on an unprecendented scale. The emperors' central concern were their own native Danubian provinces, which had been severely depopulated by the smallpox pandemic of 251-270 and by the barbarian incursions during that period. As a result vast tracts of arable land had fallen out of cultivation. This posed a serious threat to army recruitment and supply, since about half the army's strength was recruited, and based, in the Danubian provinces.)

272: The emperor Aurelian (reigned 270–275) scored a major victory over the Carpi, for which he was granted the title Carpicus Maximus by the Senate. He then resettled a large number of Carpi prisoners around Sopiana (Pécs, Hungary) in the Roman province of Pannonia. This appears to have inaugurated the policy of resettling the Carpi in the empire.

296-305: In 296, the emperor Diocletian (reigned 284–305) went to war against the Carpi, the Romans' first major conflict with this people since its defeat by Aurelian 23 years earlier. The war ended in 297 with a crushing Roman victory. A panegyric of 297 hails "the recent disasters [suffered by] the Carpi" (proxima illa ruina Carporum). Diocletian claimed the title Carpicus Maximus for the first time. In 298, Diocletian handed the lower Danube command to his Caesar (deputy emperor), Galerius. In an intensive series of campaigns, Galerius inflicted four more defeats on the Carpi in just two years (302-303 inclusive). These victories are attested by the 4 additional Carpicus titles claimed by Diocletian and his three imperial colleagues (known as the Tetrarchs. (It was apparently their practice to claim victory-titles collectively, thus all four claimed Carpicus titles for the victories achieved by Galerius).

305-311: After acceding as Augustus (full emperor) in 305, Galerius is recorded as claiming the Carpicus title for a sixth time, at some time during his reign.

318: The emperor Constantine I the Great (reigned 312–337) is recorded as holding the Carpicus Maximus title in an inscription of that year. This most likely represents a victory over the Carpi in 316–317, when Constantine is documented as resident in the Balkans for the first time since his appointment as Caesar in 306.

Each of these acclamations probably implied the slaying of at least 5,000 Carpi (as traditionally required for the grant of a Triumph in Rome). For the Carpi, these defeats were accompanied by mass deportations and resettlement inside the empire. According to Ammianus, Diocletian's regime continued to settle Carpi in Pannonia, and, apparently, in Scythia Minor (i.e. the coastal region of modern Romania). Eutropius reports that "enormous numbers" were transferred. Heather interprets these reports as implying hundreds of thousands of deportees. According to Victor, writing in 361, the entire remaining Carpi people were transferred into the empire.

== Carpi after 318 ==
There are several indications that the Carpi may have been largely eliminated north of the Danube by 318:

1. The evidence of Aurelius Victor that all the Carpi were deported to the empire.
2. The sheer scale of losses in repeated wars against the Romans (5 wars in a 21-year period 296–317) and subsequent mass deportations.
3. The disappearance, c. 318, of the "Daco-Carpic" culture in Moldavia, according to Bichir.
4. The absence of any mention of the transdanubian Carpi in the contemporary history of Ammianus, whose surviving books provide a detailed account of the period 353–378. (Ammianus does mention the Carpi twice, but only those settled inside the empire).
5. The fact that the Carpicus title was not claimed after 318.

Many historians dispute that the Carpi were eliminated from the Carpathian region and argue that many Carpi remained, e.g. Millar and Batty. Beyond 318, specific evidence of Carpi continuity is limited to Zosimus' reference to Karpodakai joining in a barbarian invasion of the empire in the 380s.

Even if some Carpi did remain north of the Danube, it is clear that they lost their political independence, according to Heather. After the death of Constantine, the Wallachian plain and Moldavia fell under the domination of the Thervingi branch of the Gothic nation, as evidenced by the existence of a substantial Gothic kingdom in the mid fourth century. Transylvania appears to have been dominated in the fourth century by another, probably Germanic group, the Taifals. However, the Taifali appear also to have been under Gothic suzerainty.

These Germanic kingdoms were after 350 overwhelmed by the Huns, resulting in the great Gothic-led migration of Transdanubians across the Danube that culminated in the Roman disaster at the Battle of Adrianople in 378. The Carpi are nowhere mentioned in Ammianus' detailed account of these epic events, suggesting that any who remained north of the Danube had probably lost their distinct identity.

== See also ==
- Costoboci
- Dacians
- Free Dacians
- Origin of the Albanians#Thracian or Daco-Moesian
- Late Roman army

== Bibliography ==
=== Ancient ===
- Ammianus Marcellinus Res Gestae (c. 395)
- Eusebius of Caesarea Historia Ecclesiae (c. 320)
- Eutropius Historiae Romanae Breviarium (c. 360)
- Anonymous Historia Augusta (c. 400)
- Jordanes Getica (c. 550)
- Lactantius. De Mortibus Persecutorum (On the Deaths of the Persecutors).
- Fletcher, William, trans. Of the Manner in Which the Persecutors Died. From Nicene and Post-Nicene Fathers, Second Series, Vol. 7. Edited by Alexander Roberts, James Donaldson, and A. Cleveland Coxe. Buffalo, NY: Christian Literature Publishing Co., 1886. Online at New Advent
- Ptolemy Geographia (c. 140)
- Sextus Aurelius Victor De Caesaribus (361)
- Tacitus Germania (c. 100)
- Zosimus (500a). Historia Nova (PDF). Vol. 1.
- Zosimus (500b). Historia Nova. Vol. 2.
- Zosimus (500c). Historia Nova. Vol. 3.
- Zosimus (500d). Historia Nova. Vol. 4.

=== Modern ===
- AE: Année Epigraphique ("Epigraphic Year" - periodical)
- Batty, Roger (2008): Rome and the Nomads: the Pontic-Danubian region in Antiquity
- Barrington (2000): Atlas of the Greek & Roman World
- Bichir, Gh. (1976). The History and Archaeology of the Carpi from the 2nd to the 4th centuries AD. Vol. BAR series 16(i) (English trans. ed.).
- CAH: Cambridge Ancient History 1st Ed. Vol. XII (1939): The Imperial Crisis and Recovery
- Cameron, Alan (1969): Theodosius the Great and the Regency of Stilicho in Harvard Studies in Classical Phililogy n. 73
- Carrié, Jean-Michel & Rousselle, Aline. L'Empire Romain en mutation- des Sévères à Constantin, 192–337.
- CIL: Corpus Inscriptionum Latinarum ("Corpus of Latin Inscriptions")
- Cuff, D.B. (2010): The Auxilia in Roman Britain and the Two Germanies between Augustus and Caracalla (online paper)
- Gibbon, Edward (1792): The history of the decline and fall of the Roman empire
- Goffart, Walter A. (2006): Barbarian tides: the migration age and the later Roman Empire
- Heather Peter, J. (2007): The fall of the Roman Empire: a new history of Rome and the Barbarians
- Heather Peter, J. (2009): Empires and Barbarians: Migration, Development and the Birth of Europe
- Hodder, I. (1994): Archaeological Theory today
- Holder, Paul (2003): Auxiliary Deployment in the Reign of Hadrian
- Jones, A.H.M. (1964): Later Roman Empire
- Köbler, Gerhard (2000): Indo-germanisches Wörterbuch (online)
- Lenski Noel Emmanuel (2006): The Cambridge Companion to the Age of Constantine, ISBN 978-0-521-81838-4
- Maenchen-Helfen Otto J. (1973) The world of the Huns : studies in their history and culture edited by Max Knight, published by Berkeley, University of California Press, ISBN 0-520-01596-7
- Martini, Peter I., Chesworth Ward (2010): Landscapes and Societies: Selected Cases
- Millar, Fergus (1970): The Roman Empire and its Neighbours
- Millar, Fergus, (1981): The Roman Empire and its neighbours
- Minns. Ellis Hovell (2011) "Scythians and Greeks: A Survey of Ancient History and Archaeology on the North Coast of the Euxine from the Danube to the Caucasus" published by Cambridge Library Collection Archaeology (1st ed 1913) ISBN 978-1-108-02487-7
- Müller (1883): Edition of Ptolemy's Geographia
- Niculescu, G-A. : Nationalism and the Representation of Society in Romanian Archaeology (online paper)
- Odahl, Charles Matson. Constantine and the Christian Empire. New York: Routledge, 2004. Hardcover ISBN 0-415-17485-6 Paperback ISBN 0-415-38655-1
- Parvan Vasile (1926) : Getica, publisher Cultura Nationala
- Sir William Smith's Dictionary of Greek and Roman Geography (1878)
- Philip Smith (1854) in Dictionary of Greek and Roman geography, Volume 1 edited by Sir William Smith
- Stathakopoulos, D. Ch. (2007): Famine and Pestilence in the late Roman and early Byzantine Empire
- Thompson, E.A. (1982): Zosimus 6.10.2 and the Letters of Honorius in Classical Quarterly 33 (ii)
- Tomaschek Gratz University (1883): Les restes de la langue dace in "Le Muséon Revue Internationale Volume 2, Louvain"
- Van Den Gheyn, S. J. (1930): Populations Danubiennes, Études D'ethnographie compareee in "Revue des questions scientifiques, Volumes 17-18, 1930" by "Société scientifique de Bruxelles, Union catholique des scientifiques français, ISSN 0035-2160
