= Free Dacians =

2nd to 4th century group outside Roman borders

Map of Roman Dacia between 106 and 271, including the areas with Free Dacians, Carpi and Costoboci

The Free Dacians (Romanian: Dacii liberi) is the name given by some modern historians to those Dacians who remained outside, or emigrated from, the Roman Empire after the emperor Trajan's Dacian Wars (AD 101-6). Dio Cassius named them Dakoi prosoroi (Latin: Daci limitanei) meaning "neighbouring Dacians".

A population of Dacians existed on the fringes of the Balkan Roman provinces, especially in the eastern Carpathian Mountains, at least until about AD 340. They were responsible for a series of incursions into Roman Dacia in the period AD 120-272, and into the Roman Empire south of the Danube after the province of Dacia was abandoned by the Romans around AD 275.

== Traditional paradigm ==
According to many scholars, amongst the Free Dacians were refugees from the Roman conquest, who had left the Roman-occupied zone, and some Dacian-speaking tribes resident outside that zone, notably the Costoboci and the Carpi in SW Ukraine, Moldavia and Bessarabia. The refugees may have joined these resident peoples. Through proximity with the Roman province of Dacia, the Free Dacians supposedly became Romanised and adopted the Latin language and Roman culture. Despite this acculturation, the paradigm holds that the Free Dacians were irredentists, repeatedly invading the Roman province in attempts to recover the refugees' ancestral land. They were unsuccessful until the Roman province was abandoned by the emperor Aurelian in AD 275. After this, the Free Dacians supposedly liberated the Roman province and joined the remaining Romano-Dacians to form a Latin-speaking Daco-Roman ethnic group that were the forebears of the modern Romanian people.

== Validity of paradigm ==
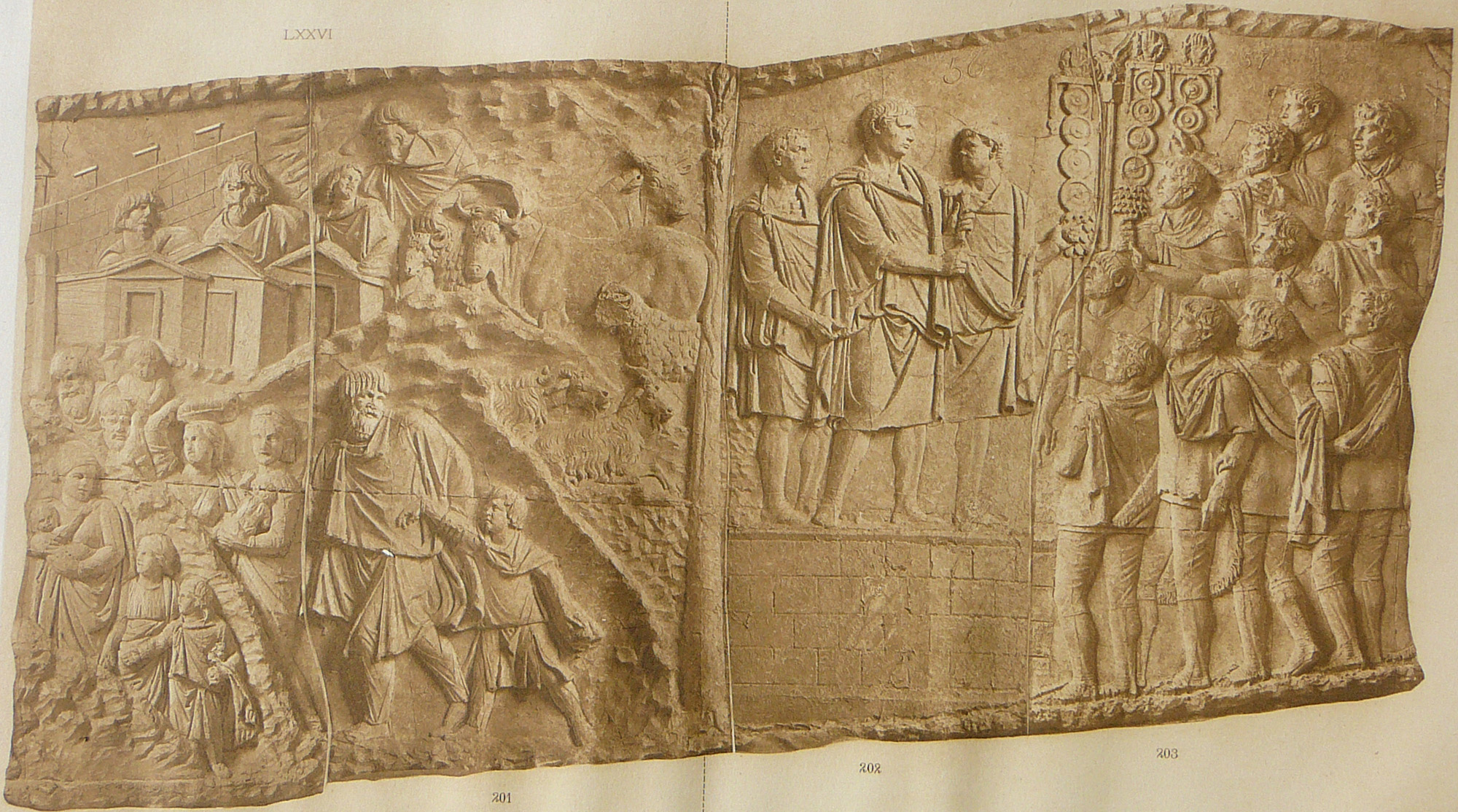
Left panel: Rural Dacian families are forced to leave their homes, taking their livestock (sheep, cattle and goats) with them, as the last garrisons of Dacian forts, including the one in the background, surrender to the Romans (shown on previous panel). Right panel: Roman emperor Trajan (r. 98-117) (on podium, centre) congratulates his victorious troops. Detail from Trajan's Column, Rome

Map showing the eastern border of the Roman Dacia in the 2nd-3rd centuries, the Limes Transalutanus

There is substantial evidence that large numbers of ethnic Dacians continued to exist on the fringes of the Roman province of Dacia. During Trajan's Dacian Wars in AD 102 and AD 106, enormous numbers of Dacians were killed or taken into slavery. It also appears that many indigenous Dacians were expelled from, or emigrated from, the occupied zone. Two panels of Trajan's Column depict lines of Dacian peasants leaving with their families and animals at the end of each war. The theory that Dacians were entirely killed or enslaved is debatable. The most plausible scenario is that after the conquest, the Dacians were largely tolerated by the Romans, and their relationship was growing relatively positive, which played a significant role in the rapid Romanization of the Dacians. The Romans brought colonists into the province and introduced Christianity to the Dacians around the 3rd to 4th century AD. Many Dacians also joined the Roman army, supporting Roman military campaigns. While some Dacians fled or migrated to the Free Dacian territories, the Free Dacians continued to maintain their independence, conducting raids on Roman territories until around the 4th century AD.

Furthermore, it appears that the Romans did not permanently occupy the entirety of Decebal's kingdom. The latter's borders, as many scholars believe, are described in Ptolemy's Geographia: the Siret river in the east, Danube in the south, Thibiscum (Timiş) river in the west and the northern Carpathian Mountains in the north. But the eastern border of the Roman province was by AD 120 set at the Limes Transalutanus ("Trans-Olt Frontier"), a line to the just east of the river Aluta (Olt), thus excluding the Wallachian plain between the limes and the river Siret. In Transylvania, the line of Roman border-forts suggests that the eastern and northern Carpathians were outside the Roman province.

The unoccupied sections of Decebal's kingdom are likely to have been inhabited predominantly by ethnic Dacians, although according to Ptolemy, the northernmost part of the kingdom (northern Carpathians/Bukovina) was shared by non-Dacian tribes: the Anartes and the Taurisci, who were probably Celtic, and the Germanic Bastarnae are also attested in this region. Furthermore, some areas were occupied after 106 by nomadic Sarmatian tribesmen, most likely a minority ruling over the sedentary Geto-Dacian majority e.g. Muntenia (eastern Wallachia), which was ruled by the Roxolani Sarmatians and possibly also northern Moldavia, which was under the Costoboci, a Dacian tribe. But there are no reports of Sarmatians controlling the remaining unoccupied region of Decebal's kingdom between the Transylvanian border of the Roman province and the Siret, i.e. the eastern Carpathians, and it is therefore in these mountain valleys and foothills that the politically independent Free Dacians were most likely concentrated, and presumably where most of the refugees from the Roman conquest escaped to.

The potential territorial evolution of the Free Dacians.

Free Dacians are reported to have invaded and ravaged the Roman province in 214 and 218. Several emperors after Trajan, as late as AD 336, assumed the victory title of Dacicus Maximus (" Grand Dacian "): Antoninus Pius (157), Maximinus I (238), Decius (250) Gallienus (257), Aurelian (272) and Constantine I the Great (336). Since such victory-titles always indicated peoples defeated, not geographical regions, the repeated use of Dacicus Maximus implies the existence of ethnic Dacians outside the Roman province in sufficient numbers to warrant major military operations into the early 4th century. The permanent deployment of a massive Roman military garrison, normally of 2 legions and over 40 auxiliary regiments (totaling ca. 35,000 troops, or about 10% of the imperial army's total regular effectives), also implies a grave threat to Roman Dacia throughout its history, between 106 and 275. There is substantial archaeological evidence of major and devastating incursions into Roman Dacia: clusters of coin-hoards and evidence of the destruction and abandonment of Roman forts. Since these episodes coincide with occasions when emperors assumed the title Dacicus Maximus, it is reasonable to suppose that the Free Dacians were primarily responsible for these raids.

In 180, the emperor Commodus, whose reign lasted from 180 to 192, is recorded as having admitted 12,000 "neighbouring Daci", who had been driven out of their own territory by hostile tribes, for settlement in the Roman province. Some scholars believe that the presence of the free Dacians is attested by the Puchov Culture in Slovakia and of the Lipiţa culture to the northeast of the Carpathians. However, the identification of these cultures with ethnic Dacians is controversial, as mainstream scholarship considers Puchov as a Celtic culture. Other scholars have identified Lipiţa as Celtic, Germanic or Slavic. In any case, according to modern archaeological theory, material cultures cannot reliably prove ethnicity.

However, the identification of the Costoboci and Carpi as ethnic Dacian is far from secure. Unlike the Dacians proper, neither group is attested in Moldavia before Ptolemy (i.e. before about. 140). The Costoboci are, according to Mommsen, classified as a Sarmatian tribe by Pliny the Elder, who locates them near the river Tanais (southern river Don) in ca. AD 60, in the Sarmatian heartland of modern-day southern Russia, far to the east of Moldavia. The ethno-linguistic affiliation of the Carpi is uncertain. It has also been variously suggested that they were a Sarmatian, Germanic or Proto-Slavic group. The contemporaneous existence, alongside Dacicus Maximus, of the victory-title Carpicus Maximus - claimed by the emperors Philip the Arab (247), Aurelian (273), Diocletian (297) and Constantine I (317/8) - suggests that the Carpi may have been considered ethnically distinct from the Free Dacians by the Romans.

Map showing the Dacian-speaking Carpi place in invading Roman Dacia in AD 250–1, under the Gothic leader Kniva

The traditional paradigm is also open to challenge in other respects. There is no evidence that the peoples outside the province were Romanised to any greater extent than their non-Dacian neighbours, since the archaeological remains of their putative zone of occupation show no greater Roman influence than do other Chernyakhov culture sites elsewhere in the northern Pontic region; nor that the Free Dacians gave up their native tongue and became Latin-speakers. In 271-5, when the Roman emperor Aurelian decided to evacuate Roman Dacia, its Roman residents are reported by ancient sources to have been deported en masse to the province of Moesia Inferior, a Roman territory south of the Danube. These reports have been challenged by some modern scholars who, based primarily on archaeological finds, argue that many rural inhabitants of the Roman province, and even part of the urban population, with few links to the Roman administration or army, remained behind. However, leaving behind the Romano-Dacian peasantry would have defeated the main purpose of the evacuation, which was to repopulate the Roman provinces south of the Danube, whose inhabitants had been decimated by plague and barbarians invasions, and to bring back into cultivation the extensive abandoned lands (terrae desertae) in those provinces. These were also presumably the aims of Aurelian's contemporaneous resettlement in Roman Pannonia of a substantial section of the Carpi people that he defeated in 273.

== Ultimate fate ==
The latest secure mention of the Free Dacians in the ancient sources is Constantine I's acclamation as Dacicus Maximus in 336. For the year 381, the Byzantine chronicler Zosimus records an invasion over the Danube by a barbarian coalition of Huns, Sciri and what he terms Karpodakai, or Carpo-Dacians. There is much controversy about the meaning of this term and whether it refers to the Carpi. However, it certainly refers to the Dacians, and most likely means the "Dacians of the Carpathians". However, it is uncertain whether this term constitutes reliable evidence that the Dacians were still a major force at this time. Zosimus is regarded as an unreliable chronicler by a single scholar and has been criticised by one scholar as having "an unsurpassable claim to be regarded as the worst of all the extant Greek historians of the Roman Empire...it would be tedious to catalogue all the instances where this historian has falsely transcribed names, not to mention his confusion of events...". It is accepted that the Zosimus quote proves the continued existence in 381 of the Dacians as a distinct ethnic group.

== See also ==
- Dacians
- Dacia (Roman province)
- Costoboci
- Carpi (people)
- Hutsuls
- Origin of the Romanians
- Eastern Romance substratum

== Sources ==
=== Ancient ===
- Ammianus Marcellinus Res Gestae (ca. 395)
- Dio Cassius Roman History (ca. AD 230)
- Eusebius of Caesarea Historia Ecclesiae (ca. 320)
- Eutropius Historiae Romanae Breviarium (ca. 360)
- Anonymous Historia Augusta (ca. 400)
- Jordanes Getica (ca. 550)
- Pliny the Elder Naturalis Historia (ca. AD 70)
- Ptolemy Geographia (ca. 140)
- Sextus Aurelius Victor De Caesaribus (361)
- Tacitus Germania (ca. 100)
- Zosimus Historia Nova (ca. 500)

=== Modern ===
- AE: Année Epigraphique ("Epigraphic Year" - academic journal) Author?
- Barrington (2000): Atlas of the Greek & Roman World
- Batty, Roger (2008): Rome and the Nomads: the Pontic-Danubian region in Antiquity
- Bichir, Gh. (1976): History and Archaeology of the Carpi from the 2nd to the 4th centuries AD
- Cambridge Ancient History 1st Ed. Vol. XII (1939): The Imperial Crisis and Recovery Author?
- Cambridge Ancient History 2nd Ed. Vol. XII (2005): The Crisis of Empire, A.D. 193-337 Author?
- CIL: Corpus Inscriptionum Latinarum ("Corpus of Latin Inscriptions")
- Garašanin, Milutin V., Benac Alojz (1973) “Actes du VIIIe congrès international des sciences préhistoriques” International Union of Prehistoric and Protohistoric Sciences
- Holder (Paul) (2003): Auxiliary Deployment in the Reign of Hadrian
- MacKendrick, Paul Lachlan (1975): The Dacian stones speak ISBN 978-0-8078-4939-2
- Millar, Fergus (1970): The Roman Empire and its Neighbours
- Millar, Fergus (1981): The Roman Empire and its Neighbours publisher Gerald Duckworth & Co Ltd, ISBN 978-0-7156-1452-5
- Niculescu, G-A. : Nationalism and the Representation of Society in Romanian Archaeology (online paper)
- Smith's Dictionary of Greek and Roman Geography (1878)
- Thompson, E.A. (1982): Zosimus 6.10.2 and the Letters of Honorius in Classical Quarterly 33 (ii)
