= Pavel Ardzinba =

Abkhazian businessman (1951–2017)

Pavel Ardzinba (1951 – 13 December 2017) was a businessman from Abkhazia who has been indicted in absentia for organising failed assassination attempts on Alexander Ankvab in July 2007 and February 2012 and on Pitsunda Mayor Beslan Ardzinba in September 2007 and June 2009. In September 2017 he surrendered to police but was released on bail. On 13 December 2017 he, together with his driver, was gunned down in his own car near Sukhumi.

== Career ==
Pavel Ardzinba has generally shunned publicity. In the summer of 2005, he gave one interview with the opposition newspaper Forum. According to the article, Ardzinba was born in 1951 in Gudauta and graduated from Duripsh high school. He studied at but did not graduate from the Law Faculty of Rostov State University (at the same time as Alexander Ankvab). During the 1992-1993 war with Georgia, Ardzinba became Deputy Minister of Defence responsible for Armaments and Technology. Ardzinba claimed that before the war, he was the richest man of Abkhazia with assets of 600 million rubles and that he contributed greatly to the war effort.

After the war, Pavel Ardzinba became President of the Abkhazian-Turkish company Abtur. According to an August 2005 estimate by the newspaper Ekho Abxazii, Ardzinba was still the wealthiest and the fifth most influential businessman of Abkhazia.

== Involvement in criminal affairs ==
=== Assassination of Aka Ardzinba ===
Under the Presidency of Vladislav Ardzinba, Pavel Ardzinba was generally believed to head one of the country's two main clans, and to be responsible for the murder of Aka Ardzinba in Moscow on 3 February 2003, the head of the other clan.

=== Assassination attempts on Alexander Ankvab ===
The current president of Abkhazia, Alexander Ankvab, has been targeted by several assassination attempts since first becoming prime minister in 2005. On 15 May 2012, the prosecutor office made public that on 14 May, it had placed Pavel Ardzinba on an international wanted list because it suspected him of organising the attempts in February 2012 (together with former Interior Minister Almasbei Kchach) and July 2007. On 15 May, the court ordered Ardzinba's preliminary detention in absentia.

=== Assassination attempts on Beslan Ardzinba ===
On 20 September 2007, an anti-tank grenade was fired from an RPG-26 launcher at the Mercedes-Benz E-220 of Pitsunda Mayor Beslan Ardzinba while it was driving down the coastal road near the village of Blabyrkhua, Gudauta District. On 1 June 2009 around 9:00, an improvised explosive devise planted at the entrance of the town hall was remotely detonated as Beslan Ardzinba and two colleagues entered the building, causing varying degrees of injuries.

On 16 May 2012, in the course of the investigation into the assassination attempts on Alexander Ankvab, the Prosecutor General also indicted Pavel Ardzinba for having organised the two attempts on the life of Beslan Ardzinba.
