= Beslan Ardzinba =

Abkhazian politician

Beslan Ardzinba is a former Mayor of Pitsunda, Abkhazia. (Note: The political status of Abkhazia is disputed. Having unilaterally declared independence from Georgia in 1992, Abkhazia is formally recognised as an independent state by 5 UN member states (two other states previously recognised it but then withdrew their recognition), while the remainder of the international community recognizes it as de jure Georgian territory. Georgia continues to claim the area as its own territory, designating it as Russian-occupied territory.)

== Early life ==
Beslan Ardzinba was born on 13 March 1954. In 1961, he entered high school in the village of Duripsh in the Gudauta District. From 1972 until 1974, Ardzinba served in the Soviet army. Between 1975, he entered the Institute for Subtropical Agriculture in Sukhumi, graduating in 1981.

== Career ==
In 1981, Beslan Ardzinba started work as foreman of a farm in Duripsh. He became Deputy Chairman in 1989 and Chairman in 1991. Between 1997 and 2006, Ardzinba was Director of Operations of the Gudauta forestry agency.

=== Mayor of Pitsunda ===
In October 2006, Ardzinba was appointed Mayor of Pitsunda. On 8 February 2007, the People's Assembly of Abkhazia granted Pitsunda town-status, whenceforth its mayor would no longer be appointed by the Governor of Gagra District, but instead directly by the President of Abkhazia. In the February 2011 Town Council election, Ardzinba was re-elected and subsequently re-appointed as Mayor by President Bagapsh.

Following the May 2014 Revolution and the election of Raul Khajimba as President, on 28 October 2014 he replaced Ardzinba as Mayor with Chingis Bigvava.

== Assassination attempts ==
On 20 September 2007, an anti-tank grenade was fired from an RPG-26 launcher at Beslan Ardzinba's Mercedes-Benz E-220 while it was driving down the coastal road near the village of Blabyrkhua, Gudauta District. On 1 June 2009 around 9:00, an improvised explosive devise planted at the entrance of the town hall was remotely detonated as Beslan Ardzinba and two colleagues entered the building, causing varying degrees of injuries.

On 16 May 2012, in the course of the investigation in the Assassination attempts on Alexander Ankvab, the Prosecutor General also indicted Pavel Ardzinba for having organised the two attempts on the life of Ardzinba.

== Personal life ==
Beslan Ardzinba is married with four children. In 1985 he received the Order of the Red Banner of Labour.
