= Bichvinta mosaic =

Old Georgian Byzantine mosaic

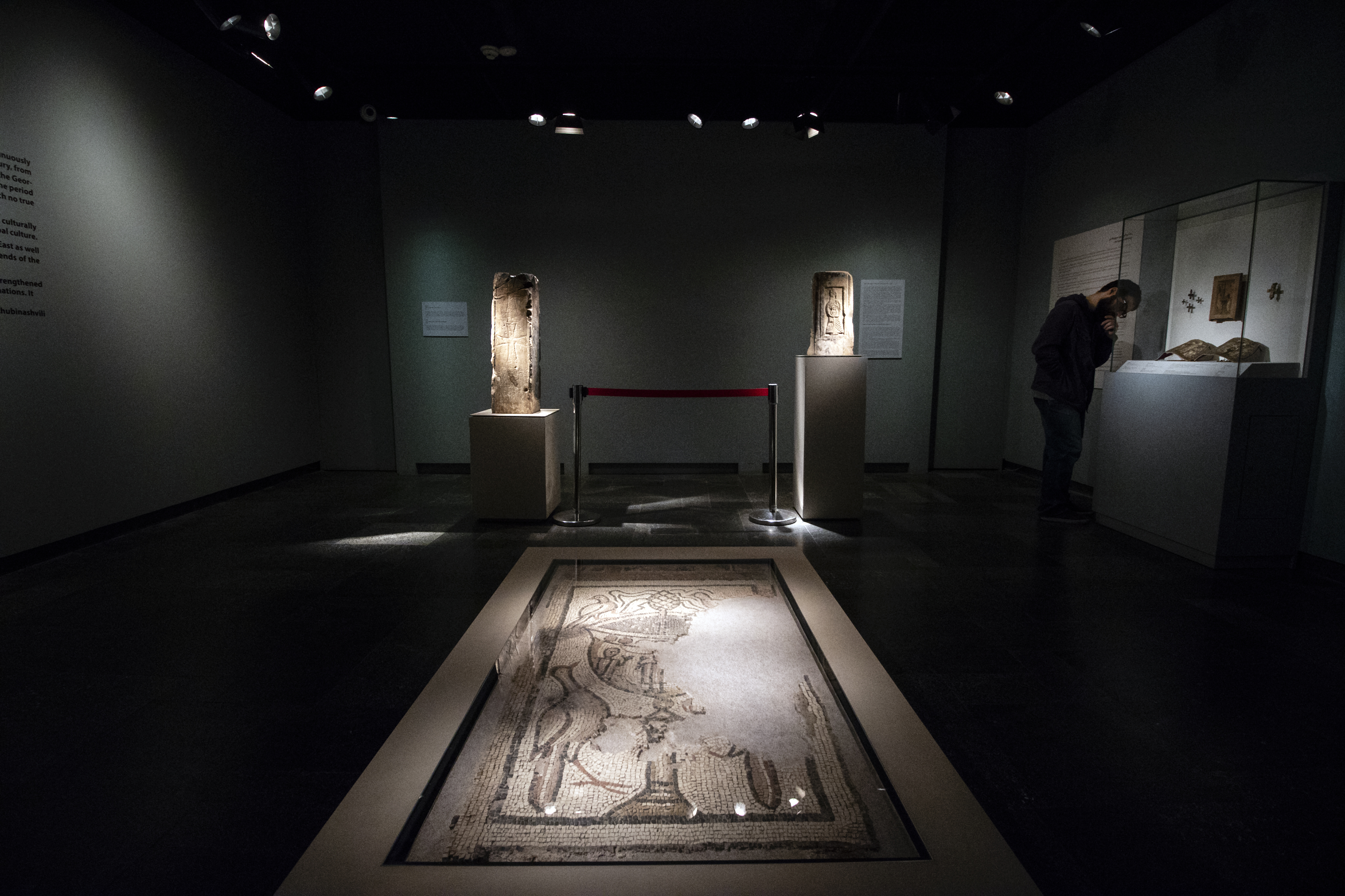
- Material: Mosaic
- Created: V-VII centuries
- Discovered: 1952
- Present location: Georgian National Museum, Tbilisi

The Bichvinta mosaic (Georgian: ბიჭვინთის მოზაიკა, romanized: bich'vintis mozaik'a) is a 5th or 6th-century floor mosaic from the ruined early Christian church at a cape in the coastal town of Bichvinta, (anciently Pityus), in Abkhazia region of Georgia. It depicts symbolic animals, birds, and plants.

== History ==
The mosaic was discovered, in 1952, in a ruined 4th-century Byzantine three-nave basilica. Fragments of the mosaic pavements were preserved in the apse, the spacious narthex, and baptistery. The surviving fragments were removed, restored, and laid on display at the Georgian National Museum in Tbilisi.

The Pityus mosaic seems to have been inspired by the earlier Roman prototypes and reveals close stylistic affinities with Syro-Palestinian mosaics. The closest regional counterpart is the near-contemporaneous mosaic of the Tsromi Church in eastern Georgia.

== Description ==
The mosaic is made of rectangular pieces of local colored stone, with cleanly trimmed brick lime solution. The background is orange. A stylized Greek inscription mentions the donor, Oreli. The central piece of the apse mosaic is a large Christogram, with Alpha and Omega, flanked and framed by interwoven Acanthus foliage. To the left of the monogram there is a depiction of a blossoming plant twig with plants and birds. The composition is embellished with various geometric ornamentation. The narthex mosaic contains several small areas depicting fishes and birds. The entrance was embellished with the image of a fountain with birds on either side. Other fragments depict stags and deer.
