= Razhden Gumba =

Abkhazian composer (1926–2007)

Razhden Dzhguatan-ipa Gumba
- Ражьден Џьгәаҭан-иԥа Гәымба
- Razhden Gumba on a 2008 postage stamp of Abkhazia
- Born: September 12, 1926; Duripsh, Gudauta District, SSR Abkhazia
- Died: August 21, 2007 (aged 80); Sukhumi, Abkhazia, Georgia
- Occupation: composer

Razhden Dzhguatan-ipa Gumba (12 September 1926 — 21 August 2007) was an Abkhazian composer, arranger, conductor and musicologist.

== Life and Career ==
Gumba was born on 12 September 1926 to a Bulgarian mother who sang in a church choir, and advised him to devote his life to music. His grandfather Mamsyr Gumba, who was a renowned folk singer and storyteller, often took him to the gatherings of the elders, where he heard them sing and discuss the meaning of the old folk songs.

Despite lacking any knowledge of musical notation, he began to compose at age 14, using his own invented system and symbols. In 1947 he began studies at the Sukhumi Musical College. The school opened a composition department specially for him, bringing in teachers from Tbilisi.

In 1955 he began studies at the House of Folk Art in Tbilisi. He was also appointed head of the Folk Song and Dance Ensemble of Abkhazia.

He led various folk and choral groups, including the Abkhaz Philharmonic and the Abkhaz State Choir Chapel. He composed works in many genres but his main focus was on works for choirs, including at least 70 arrangements of Abkhazian folk songs.

Gumba used the words of many Abkhaz poets in his songs, but he often wrote the text himself too. He also wrote poetry and plays.

== Awards and Honours ==
- 1958 — Honoured Artist of the Georgian SSR
- 1970 — Honoured Artist of the Abkhazian ASSR
- 1974 — Dimitri Gulia State Prize of Abkhazian ASSR
- 1984 — People's Artist of the Abkhazian ASSR

The Abkhaz Philharmonic Hall in Sukhumi has been named in honour of Razhden Gumba.
