= Successianus =

3rd century Roman general and praetorian prefect

Successianus was a Roman soldier, general and praetorian prefect in the third century AD of whom very little is known for certain. He is said to have distinguished himself as commander of the garrison of an allied city besieged by barbarian pirates, and then made praetorian prefect by the emperor Valerian on the strength of this. As praetorian prefect appears to have done useful work in restoring Antioch, the capital of the Roman East, after the devastation which had been inflicted by Shapur, the King of the Persians, in his invasion of 252. However, he was overwhelmed by the circumstances with which he had to contend when Shapur invaded on a second occasion in 260 and seems to have shared in the defeat of Valerian at the Battle of Edessa and his subsequent captivity in Persia.

== Sources ==
What little is known of Successianius comes from the Historia Nova of Zosimus and the information is teased out by Professor Andreas Alföldi and by Laurence Lee Howe. This article is based on their accounts.

== Origins ==
Nothing is known of Successianus's origins or his date of birth. The absence of any evidence as to his nomen means that onomastic analysis cannot be applied.

== Career ==
Successianus is first encountered, probably in 254, as the commander of the garrison of Pityus, a city in the Kingdom of Colchis on the eastern coast of the Black Sea in modern Georgia. This region did not lie within the Roman imperial frontier, but it is known that Rome was in a treaty relationship with Colchis and supplied garrisons at key points. During Successianus's watch, Pityus came under attack by the Borani, one of the peoples who lived in the steppes north of the Crimea known generally as the Scythae. The Borani raid on Pityus was one of the first of the seaborne expeditions by the Scythae which were to reach their peak in the 260s. Thanks to Successianus's inspired leadership, the city held out and the raiders were forced to retreat after suffering considerable losses.

This success by one of his commanders inspired the Emperor Valerian who had recently arrived in Syria Coele to take charge of the war against the Persians to call Successianus to his headquarters in Antioch, where he is said to have assisted the Emperor in rebuilding the city which had been reduced to ruins by King Shapur in 252. He is then supposed to have been made Praetorian Prefect although Zozimus nowhere says this. If he was thus promoted, his authority is likely to have been exercised in the Asian and oriental provinces which were ruled by Valerian as the senior emperor (The European, African and Egyptian provinces were ruled by Valerian's son Gallienus who may have had Silvanus as his praetorian prefect.

== End ==
Unfortunately, the qualities that had made Successianus an excellent garrison commander in Pityus were obviously not those he needed as Valerian's Chief-of-General Staff: the Roman defence of the East, torn between the need to fend off Shapur in Mesopotamia and Syria and the Scythae in Asia Minor, was generally ineffective. Unable to battle the deadly combination of military defeat and plague, military morale seems to have collapsed. It is supposed that Successianus was with Valerian, still serving him as Praetorian Prefect when Shapur defeated him and took him captive near the city of Osrhoene Edessa in June(?) 260. It is supposed that, like his Emperor, he died in Persian captivity.

It is impossible to determine whether in Successianus we see a promising officer who had shown sufficient promise to be promoted praepositus of the garrison of an allied city, but was then elevated beyond his capabilities, or a soldier of some competence who was unable to get a grip on the situation that prevailed at the headquarters of the Imperial field-army. Some combination of these possibilities is more than likely.
