= Elbrussky =

Elbrussky (Russian: Эльбрусский; masculine), Elbrusskaya (Эльбрусская; feminine), or Elbrusskoye (Эльбрусское; neuter) is the name of several inhabited localities in Russia.

== Modern localities ==
- Elbrussky (urban-type settlement), an urban-type settlement under the administrative jurisdiction of the town of republic significance of Karachayevsk in the Karachay-Cherkess Republic; 43°34′N 42°9′E

== Alternative names ==
- Elbrussky, alternative name of Elbrus, a selo in Elbrussky District of the Kabardino-Balkar Republic; 43°16′N 42°39′E
