= Pitsunda =

Town in Abkhazia, Georgia

Pitsunda: ბიჭვინთა (Georgian); Пицунда (Abkhaz); Пицунда (in Russian)
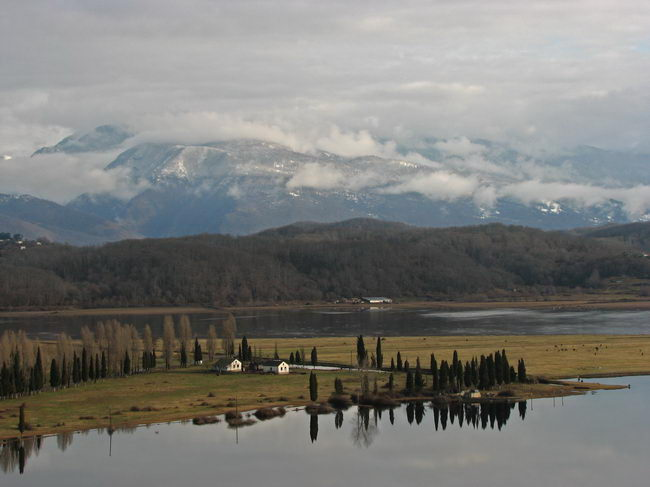
- The view of Caucasus mountains from Pitsunda cape.

- Location of Pitsunda

- Location within Georgia Location within Abkhazia Location within Black Sea
- Coordinates: 43°10′N 40°20′E
- Country: Georgia
- Partially recognized independent country: Abkhazia
- District: Gagra

Government
  - Mayor: Vitali Khutava
  - Deputy Mayor: Beslan Smyr

Population (2011)
  - Total: 4,198
- Climate: Cfa

Pitsunda or Bichvinta (Georgian: ბიჭვინთა, [bitʃʼʷintʰa]; Abkhaz: Пицунда; Russian: Пицунда) is a resort town in the Gagra District of Abkhazia/Georgia. (Note: The political status of Abkhazia is disputed. Having unilaterally declared independence from Georgia in 1992, Abkhazia is formally recognised as an independent state by 4 UN member states (three other states previously recognised it but then withdrew their recognition), while the remainder of the international community recognizes it as de jure Georgian territory. Georgia continues to claim the area as its own territory, designating it as Russian-occupied territory.) Founded by Greek colonists in the 5th century BC, Pitsunda became an important political and religious centre of the region in the antiquity and the Middle Ages. Since Soviet times it has been one of the main resorts of Abkhazia.

== History ==
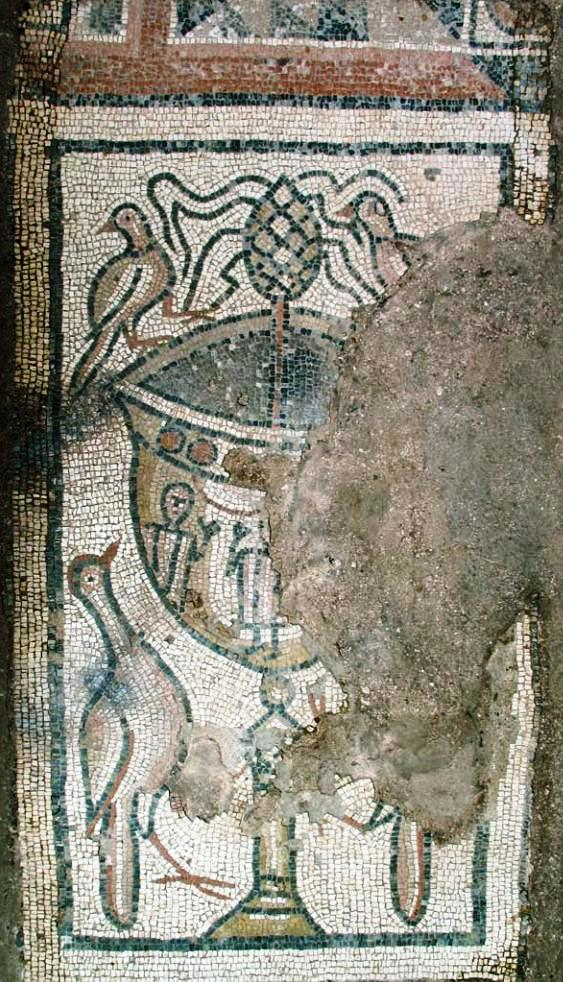
Fragment of mosaic floor of the church at Pytius (5th century)

Pityus (Ancient Greek: Pityus, Πιτυοῦς, genitive Pityuntos, Πιτυοῦντος) was a large and wealthy Greek city in the antiquity. Pliny wrote in AD 77 that the city had been sacked by the Heniochi. A Roman fort was founded at Pityus in the first half of the 2nd century and a detachment of Legio XV Apollinaris was stationed there. The city was surrounded by a defensive wall, the castellum had a second line of defence built in mid-3rd century AD. Excavations guided by Andria Apakidze unearthed, in 1952, remains of three 4th-century churches and a bath with high-quality mosaic floors. The former "Great Pityus" harbor is now a mere lake within the town.

The Goths attacked the city in 255 AD after capturing the Bosporan fleet. The Roman garrison under the command of Successianus repelled the attack, however they returned in the next year, took the city and proceeded further to sack Trebizond.

Saint John Chrysostom was being led towards Pityus by the imperial soldiers, in execution of the decree of exile, when he died on the way in 407. Like Dioskurias (modern Sukhumi), it remained under Roman control within the Georgian kingdom of Colchis until the 7th century. The city passed under Abasgian control and became one of the major political and religious centres of the kingdom of Egrisi (Lazica). An archbishopric of Pitiunt was instituted in 541. In medieval Georgia, the town's name was spelled as Bichvinta. At the end of the 10th century, King Bagrat III of Georgia built there the Pitsunda Cathedral which survives to this day and contains vestiges of wall-painting from the 13th and the 16th centuries. Bichvinta also served as the seat of the Georgian Orthodox Catholicate of Abkhazia until the late 16th century when Abkhazia came under the Ottoman hegemony. In his 1911 article for the Catholic Encyclopedia, Sophrone Pétridès described Pityus as a titular see, but it is not now found in the Catholic Church's list of such sees. In the late 13th century, the area housed a short-lived Genoese trade colony called Pezonda.

Pitsunda was the favourite resort of First Secretary of the Communist Party of the Soviet Union Nikita Khrushchev. In October 1964 he happened to be vacationing in Pitsunda when he was deposed from power. Khrushchev once proposed a major dam and hydroelectric power scheme on the Bzyb River near Pitsunda, but his experts informed him that a dam built on the Bzyb River would have had catastrophic effects in causing beach erosion at Pitsunda. In the end, the dam was built on the Inguri River instead, where the impact upon the coastline was assessed to be considerably less pronounced.

== Administration ==
=== Town status ===
On 7 February 2007, after many appeals by inhabitants, the People's Assembly of Abkhazia resolved to give Pitsunda town status. Parliamentarians expressed the hope that the decision would help Pitsunda develop as a resort. Since becoming a town, the Mayor of Pitsunda is no longer appointed by the Governor of Gagra District but instead directly by the President of Abkhazia. On 29 January 2016, Pitsunda's town status was formally enshrined in Abkhazia's constitution.

=== 2011 Assembly elections ===
In the 2011 assembly elections, Mayor Beslan Ardzinba and six other incumbent deputies of the Assembly stood for re-election. The winning candidates were Beslan Ardzinba, Badra Avidzba, Olga Grigorenko, Chengiz Bigvava, Georgi Zardania, Gennadi Cherkezia, Gennadi Mikanba, Damia Kokoskeria and Inessa Dzkuia. On 14 February, during the first session of the new convocation, Damir Kokoskeria was elected Chairman of the Assembly over Gennadi Cherkezia, by a one vote difference.

=== Since 2014 ===
Following the May 2014 Revolution and the election of Raul Khajimba as President, on 28 October 2014 he replaced Ardzinba as Mayor with Chingis Bigvava. Bigvava was not reappointed following the 2016 local elections. He was temporarily replaced by Beslan Dbar, until former head of the Association of Resorts Vitali Khutaba was temporarily appointed by Khajimba on 16 February 2017, approved by Pitsunda's town council on 20 February and permanently appointed on 27 February.

=== 2023 Gosdacha deal ===
The Gosdacha resort complex was built in 1958-1961 for the Soviet leader Nikita Khrushchev on more than 180 hectares of land near Pitsunda. It was used by senior officials of the Communist Party and after the dissolution of the Soviet Union remained under the control of Russian Federal Protective Service. Russia and Abkhazia signed an agreement in 1995 leasing the complex to Russia, however at that time Russia did not recognise Abkhazia and the legitimacy of the agreement has been questioned by local activists. On 27 December 2023 the President of Abkhazia signed the law leasing the resort to Russia for 49 years. Hundreds of demonstrators protested against the ratification of the deal starting from 26 December and demanding to amend the boundaries of the resort. The deal was condemned by the Georgian government, Ministry of Foreign Affairs of Georgia. Salome Zourabichvili called the deal "another land grab by Russians in Georgian territories...and their creeping annexation policies".

=== List of mayors ===
Heads of the Administration of the Urban-type Settlement Pitsunda:
#	Name	Entered office	Left office	Governor of Gagra District	Comments
	Chingiz Bigvava	≤ June 2000		Grigori Enik	
	Jon Dbar		≥ January 2006	Valeri Bganba	
	Beslan Ardzinba	October 2006	8 February 2007	Astamur Ketsba	
Heads of the Administration of the Town Pitsunda:
#	Name	Entered office	Left office	President	Comments
1	Beslan Ardzinba	8 February 2007	29 May 2011	Sergei Bagapsh	
1	Beslan Ardzinba	29 May 2011	1 June 2014	Alexander Ankvab	
1	Beslan Ardzinba	1 June 2014	28 October 2014	Valeri Bganba	
2	Chingis Bigvava	28 October 2014		Raul Khajimba	
	Beslan Dbar		16 February 2017	Raul Khajimba	Acting
3	Vitali Khutava	16 February 2017	Present	Raul Khajimba	
