= Roger Batty =

British historian

Academic background
- Education: The Queen's College, Oxford; University of Oxford

Academic work
- Discipline: History
- Sub-discipline: Ancient history
- Institutions: Keio University
- Notable works: Rome and the Nomads (2007)

Roger Batty is a British historian who is professor at Keio University. Batty specializes in ancient history, particularly the relationship between Romans and "barbarians" beyond the Danube in classical antiquity.

== Biography ==
Batty received his Lit. Hum from The Queen's College, Oxford in 1984 and his D.Phil in ancient history from University of Oxford in 1990. From 1990 to 1994, Battty was the speechwriter for Mostafa Kamal Tolba, Executive Director of the United Nations Environment Programme in Nairobi, Kenya. Batty has worked and studied in Geneva, Switzerland; Bucuresti, Romania; and Sofia, Bulgaria. His Rome and the Nomads: The Pontic-Danubian Realm in Antiquity (2007) was published by Oxford University Press and received to wide acclaim. Batty is professor at the Faculty of Economics at Keio University.

== Selected works ==
- Rome and the Nomads: The Pontic-Danubian Realm in Antiquity, 2007

== See also ==
- Mark Shchukin

== Sources ==
- "BATTY, Roger". Keio University.
