= Religion in Abkhazia =

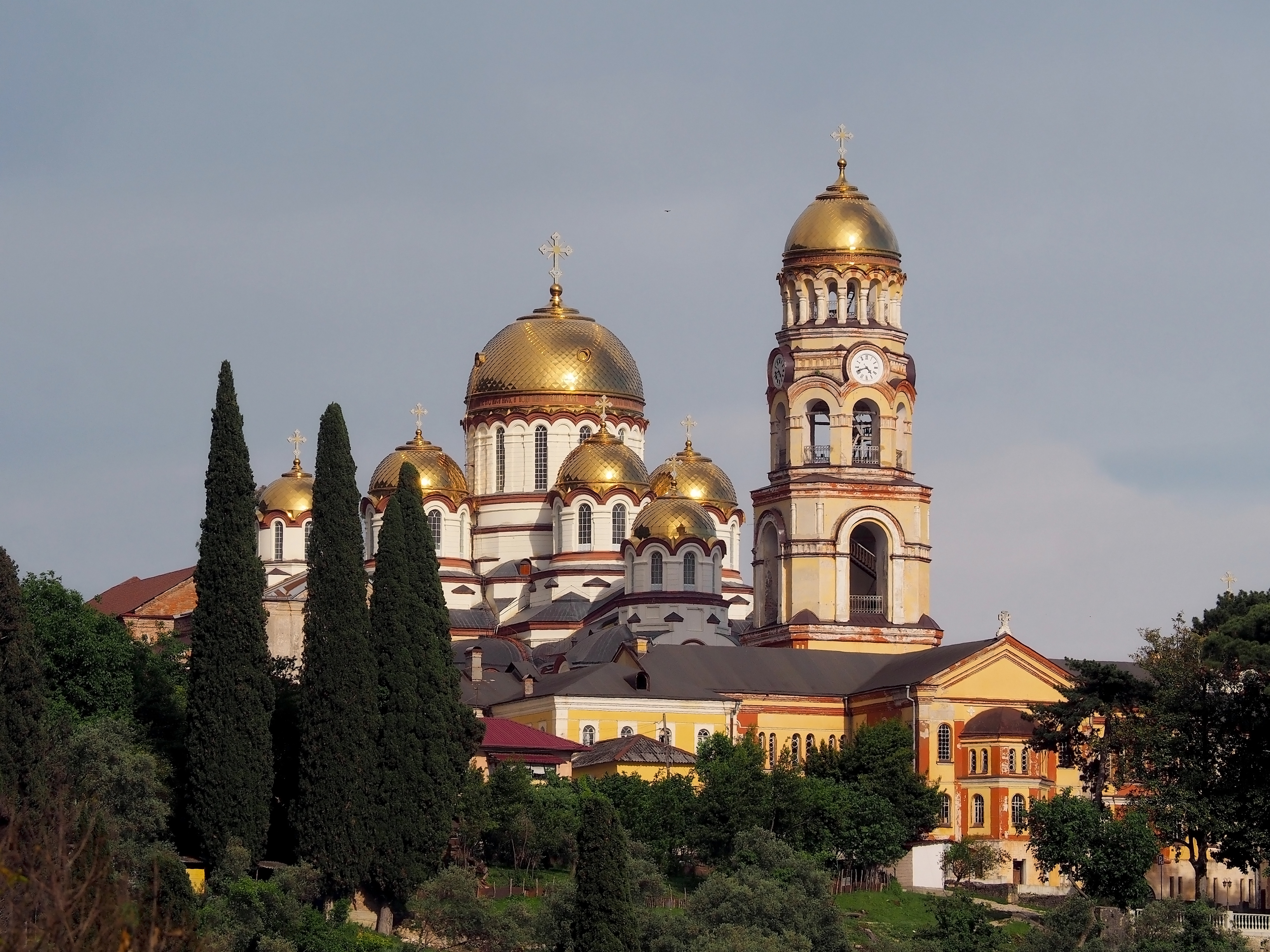
New Athos Monastery in Abkhazia, is an Abkhazian Orthodox Church.

Many inhabitants of Abkhazia are Orthodox Christians, with significant minorities adhering to Islam and the Abkhaz neopaganism, or the "Abkhazian traditional religion". The influence of this last has always remained strong and has been experiencing a revival through the 1990s and 2000s. There exists a very small number of adherents to Judaism and Jehovah's Witnesses, as well as non-believers. The Jehovah's Witnesses organization has officially been banned since 1995, though the decree is not currently enforced. According to the constitutions of both Abkhazia and Georgia, the adherents of all religions have equal rights before the law.

== Abkhaz native religion ==
The Abkhaz native religion has undergone a revival in recent decades. As of 2003, 8% of the population of Abkhazia (thus a higher percentage among ethnic Abkhazians) declares to be "pagan". It is worthwhile to note that the equivalent of the term "pagan" in Abkhazian (as well as Russian) language, язычник yazychnik, means "ethnic" rather than "country dweller" like its Western counterpart. One scholar has asserted that the Abkhazian traditional religion has become so well established and intertwined with the government to be almost the state religion of the country.

In the Abkhaz native religion, Antsua (also spelled Antzva) is the supreme God and the creator of life. The native religion is animistic, there are deities that represents thunder and the weather like Afy, others that represent the forests, wild animals, and hunting like Ayerg and Azhvepshaa. The religion has a host of different Gods that cater for each aspect of the world. Abkhaz gods have "Apaimbari" meaning angels and observers that function as representatives of the Gods on earth. They keep track of everything that is done amongst the people, while reporting everything back to the Gods.

The followers of this religion have 7 holy temples among which 6 have been restored "Dydrypsh-nykha", "Lashkendar-nykha", "Ldzaa-nykha", "Lykh-nykha" and "Ulyr-nykha". The sixth sanctuary "Inal-Kuba" is located in a mountain valley of Pskhu, which is now populated by Russians. However, the name of the 7th temple is still disputed.

== Abrahamic religions ==
=== Christianity ===
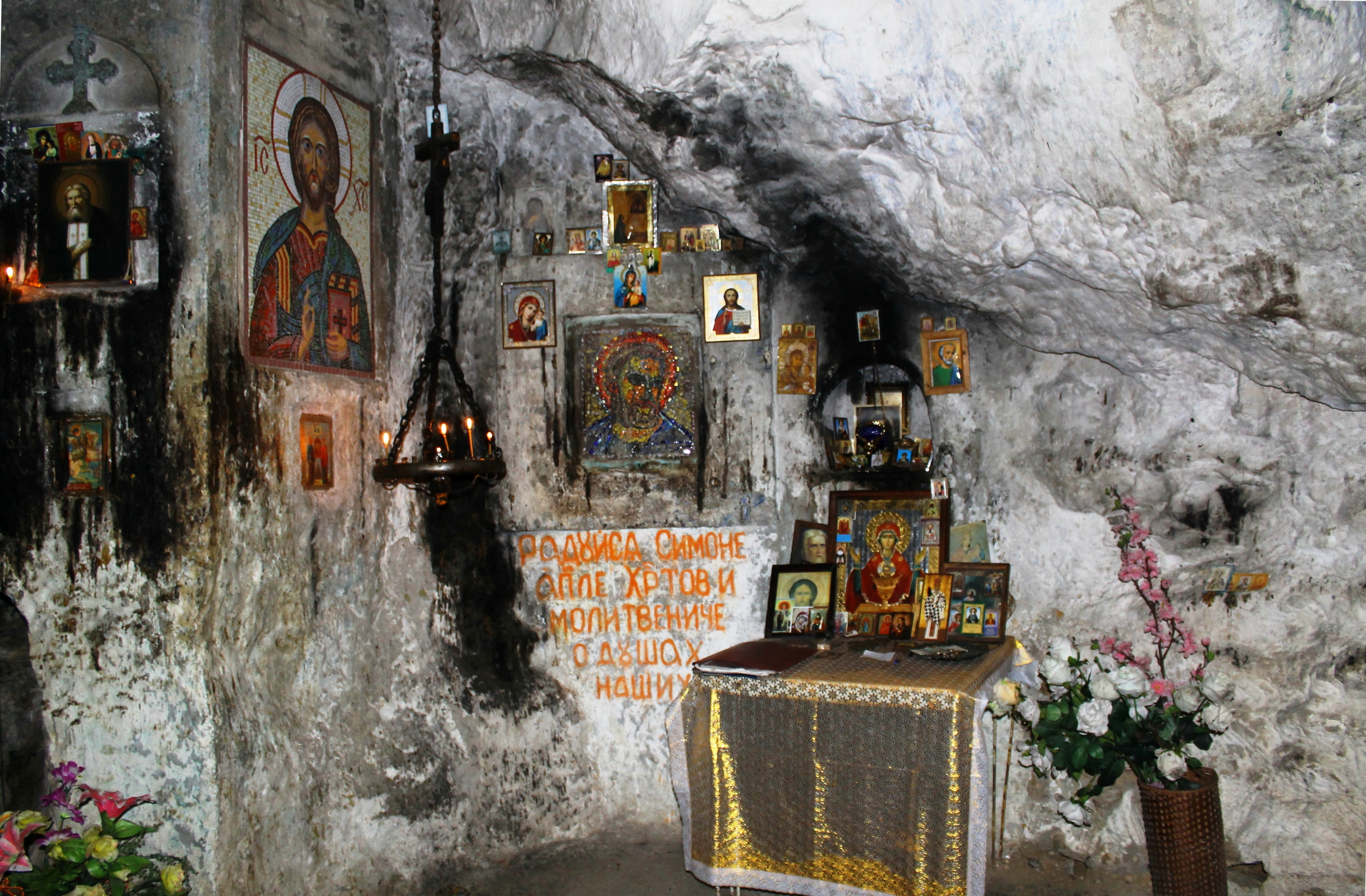
St. Simon the Zealot's (Simon Kananaios) Cave in Abkhazia

In a 2003 survey 60% of respondents identified themselves as Christian; according to a report published by UNPO in 2015, 75% of the population were Christian. The two main churches active in Abkhazia are the Abkhazian Orthodox Church and the Armenian Apostolic Church. There are approximately 140 church buildings in Abkhazia, most of which date to the first millennium.

The Abkhazian Orthodox Church operates outside the official Eastern Orthodox ecclesiastical hierarchy, as all Eastern Orthodox churches recognise Abkhazia as belonging to the jurisdiction of the Georgian Orthodox church. The Georgian Orthodox Church lost effective control over the Sukhumi-Abkhazian eparchy following the 1992-1993 war in Abkhazia, when ethnically Georgian priests had to flee Abkhazia. It maintains its structures in exile, where the current head is Archbishop Daniel. The Abkhazian Orthodox Church came into existence when the ethnically Abkhaz branch of the Sukhumi-Abkhazian Eparchy declared on 15 September 2009 that it no longer considered itself part of the Georgian Orthodox Church and that it was re-establishing the Catholicate of Abkhazia disbanded in 1814.

The Georgian Orthodox Church has accused the Russian Orthodox Church of interfering in its internal affairs, thereby violating Orthodox canon law, by training and sending into Abkhazia priests, publishing translations of the Gospels into the Abkhaz language and annexing Georgian Orthodox property in Abkhazia. The Russian Orthodox Church claims that the priests it has sent serve in Abkhazia only temporarily while the local Orthodox believers do not have contacts with the Georgian Orthodox Church.

May 15, 2011 at the National Assembly of the Church in the city of New Athos (Anakopiya), proclaimed the establishment of a new church organization - the Holy Metropolis of Abkhazia.

The Catholic Church in Abkhazia is the third largest Christian denomination, and mostly consists of mainly Armenians, Poles, and expatriates living in Abkhazia. The Holy See does not have diplomatic relations with Abkhazia, but has enjoyed two high level visits from the apostolic nuncio.

There are also small Protestant congregations.

==== History of Christianity in Abkhazia ====
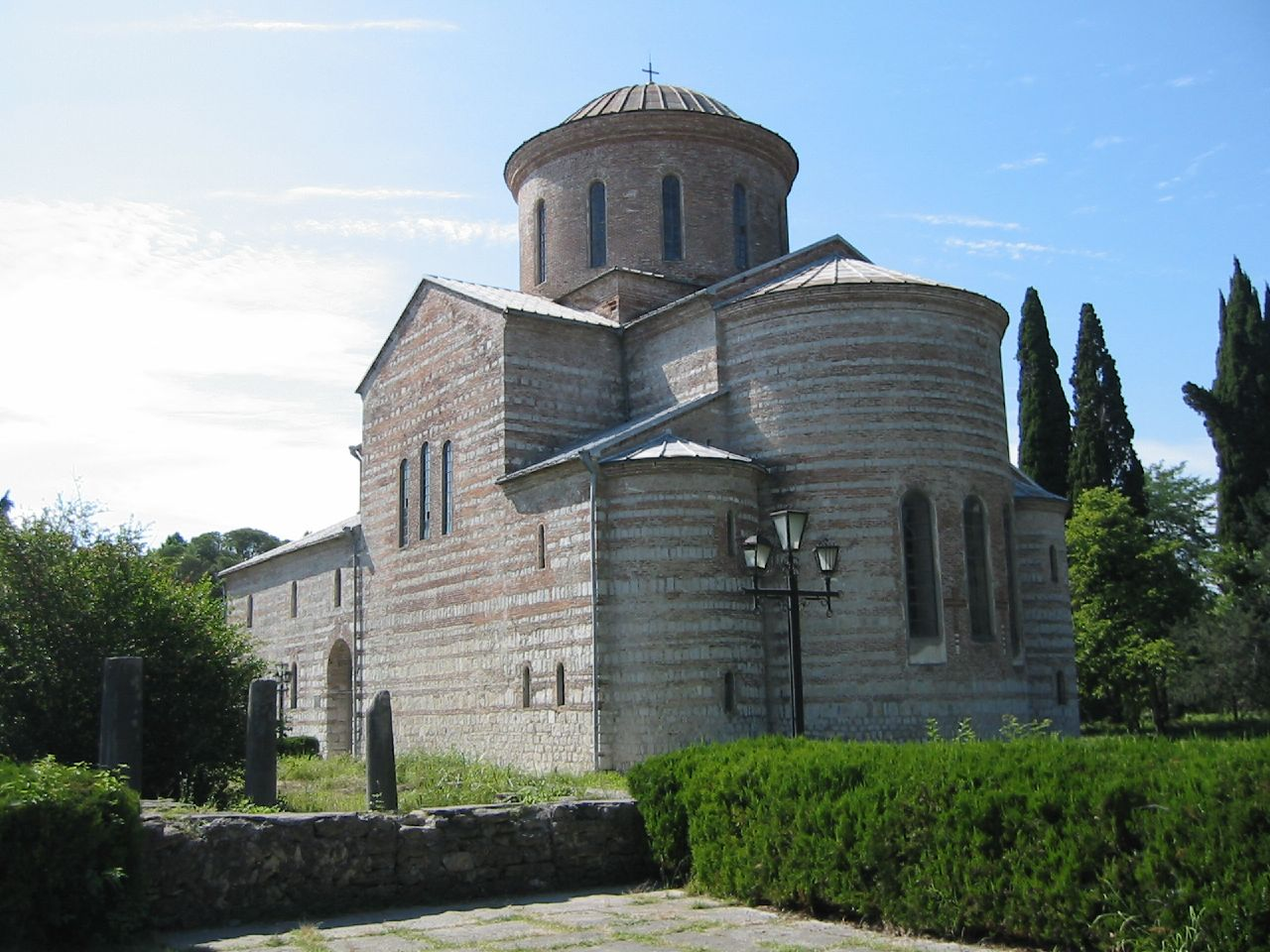
Pitsunda Cathedral, or St. Andrew the Apostle Cathedral, main seat of the Abkhazian Orthodox Church

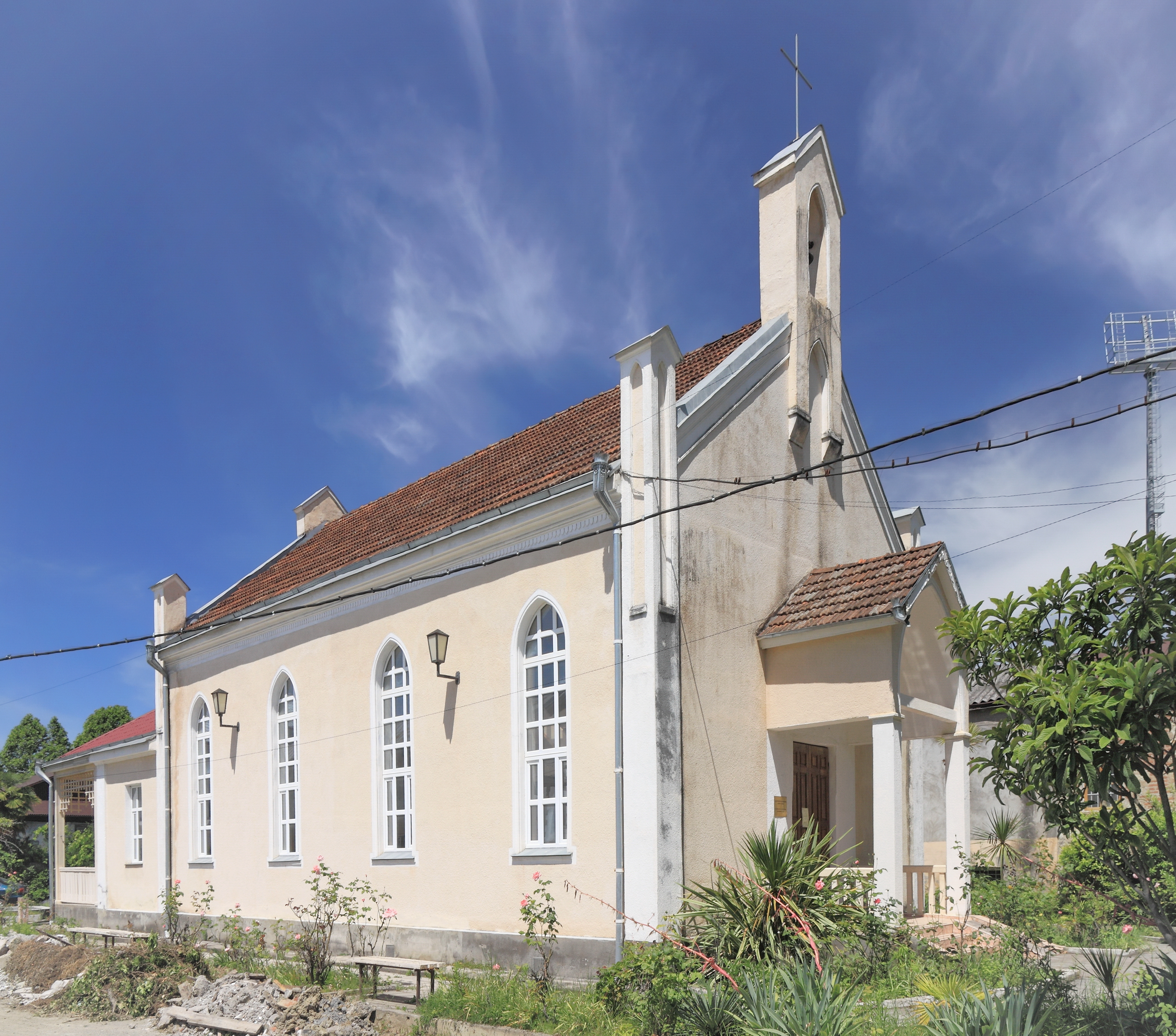
Sukhumi St. John's Lutheran Church

The earliest accounts of the introduction of Christianity into the present-day Abkhazia date to the 1st century AD, and from 325, when the bishop of Pityus (present day Pitsunda) participated in the First Ecumenical Council in Nicaea. From around the 9th century onwards, the Orthodox dioceses of Abkhazia were governed by the Catholicate of Abkhazia, subordinated to the Georgian Orthodox Church. The Catholicate of Abkhazia and the Georgian Orthodox Church were abolished in 1814 and 1811. The dioceses were taken over by the Russian Orthodox Church. The Georgian Orthodox Church regained its independence in 1917, after the fall of Tsar Nicholas II.

Caucasus Germans migrated to Abkhazia largely in the first half of the 19th century. Most of them were Lutherans or Baptists. There were three German colonies: Neudorf, Gnadenberg, and Lindau. Estonians in Abkhazia settled mostly in the late 19th century. By 1887, the first Lutheran church-school had been completed in the village of Estonia which operated as a school and a prayer house. The St. John's Lutheran Church was built in Sukhumi in 1913–15 which attended to the local Estonians, Germans and Latvians.

The first Adventist missionary, Vagram Pampanyan, arrived in Sukhumi in 1904 and began his ministry among the local Armenians.

During the 1992-1993 war in Abkhazia, the Georgian Orthodox church effectively lost control of Abkhazian church affairs, as ethnically Georgian priests had to flee Abkhazia. The Abkhaz Priest Vissarion Aplaa became acting head of the Sukhumi-Abkhazian eparchy. In the following years, recently consecrated clerics from the neighbouring Russian Maykop Eparchy arrived in Abkhazia, who eventually coming into conflict with Vissarion. Through the mediation of Russian church officials, the two sides managed to reach a power-sharing agreement at Maikop in 2005, but this did not hold.

In April 2008, the last Georgian Orthodox priest remaining in the predominantly Georgian-populated Gali district was expelled, reportedly by Abkhaz security officers, after a "special decree" of the Sukhumi-Abkhazian Eparchy, effectively leaving the local Georgian community without access to clergy. After the capture of the Upper Kodori Valley during the August 2008 war, the two remaining monasteries of Georgian Orthodox monks and nuns there were pressured by the Abkhazian authorities to submit to the Abkhazian Orthodox authorities or else leave Abkhazia. The Abkhazian Deputy Foreign Minister Maxim Gvinjia said the Abkhazian authorities did not plan to defend Georgian monks and nuns. The monks and nuns refused, and in April 2009, they were expelled from Abkhazia.

On 15 September 2009, the Sukhumi-Abkhazian Eparchy led by Vissarion declared that it was no longer a part of the Georgian Orthodox Church, that it was re-establishing the Catholicate of Abkhazia, and that it would henceforth be known as the Abkhazian Orthodox Church.

Representatives of the Holy Metropolis of Abkhazia, a new church organization in Abkhazia, are quite successful at dialogue with the Ecumenical Patriarchate about the decision of the Abkhazian Church.

=== Islam ===
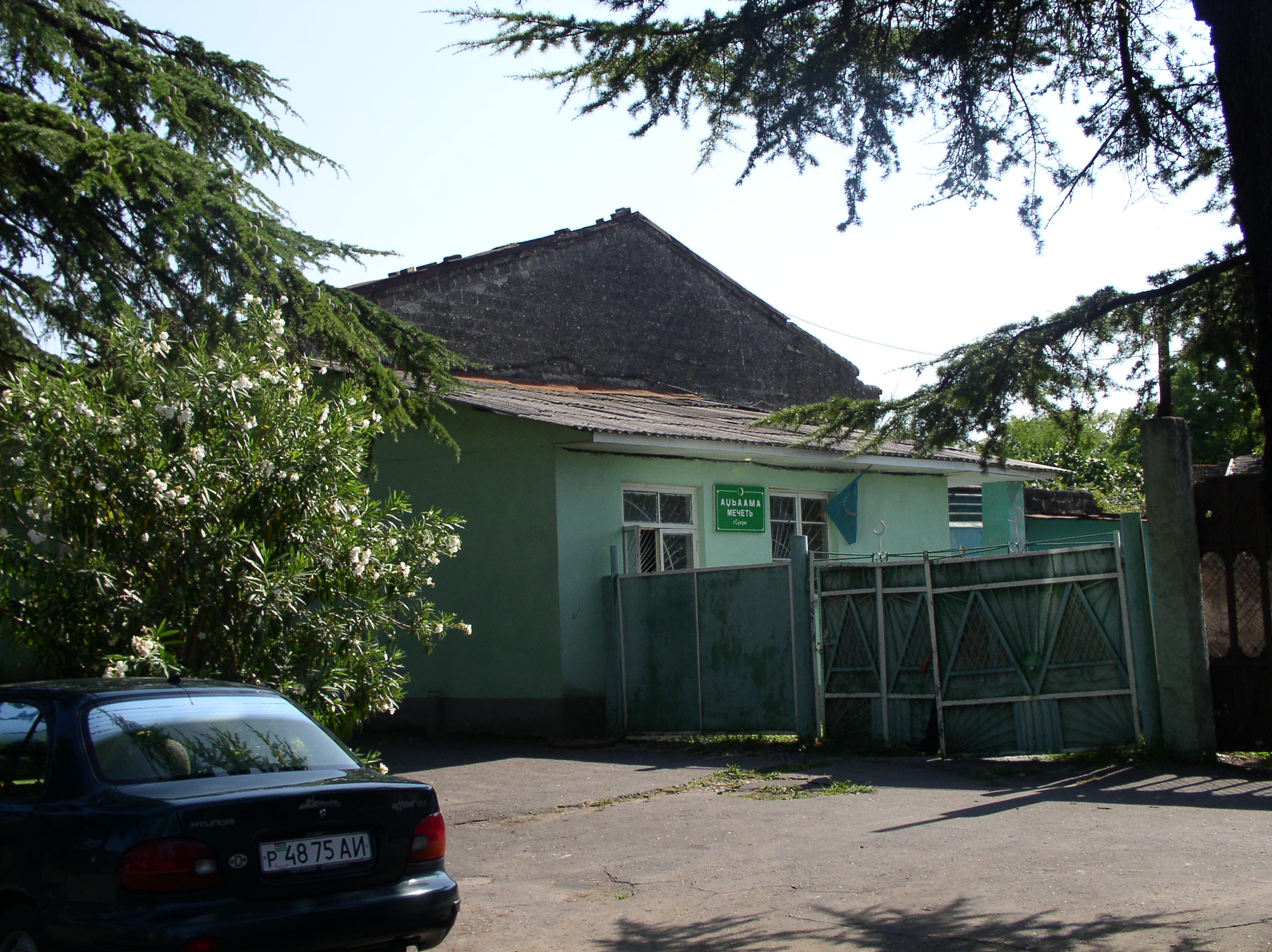
Sukhumi mosque

In a 2003 survey 16% of respondents identified themselves as Muslim. There are two mosques in Abkhazia, one in Gudauta and one in Sukhumi.

==== History of Islam in Abkhazia ====
Islam spread in Abkhazia during the times of Ottoman rule in the region from the 16th until the 18th century. The first evidence of Abkhazian Muslims was given by the Turkish historian Evliya Çelebi (whose mother was Abkhazian), in the 1640s. Throughout the 19th century Russo-Turkish wars, Abkhazian nobility was split along religious lines, with Christians being generally pro-Russian, and Muslims siding with the Ottomans against Russia. Russia's final victory in the area in the 1860s-1870s and two Abkhazian revolts forced most of Muslim Abkhaz to emigrate to the Ottoman Empire as Muhajirs in the 1870s.

Thousands of Abkhaz, known as muhajirun, fled Abkhazia for the Ottoman Empire in the mid-19th century, after resisting the Russian Empire's conquest of the Caucasus. Today, Turkey is home to the world's largest Abkhaz diaspora community. Size estimates vary: diaspora leaders say 1 million people while Abkhaz estimates range from 150,000 to 500,000.

In 2009, Muslims in Abkhazia received for the first time an invitation from the King of Saudi Arabia to go on Hajj to Mecca.

On 19 December 2011, the Spiritual Board of the Muslims in Abkhazia held its fourth congress, after the death of its Chairman First Mufti of Abkhazia Adlia Gablia. Salikh Kvaratskhelia was elected the new chairman, Roman Jugelia and Timur Dzyba Deputy Chairmen.

==== Murders in the 21st-century ====
Daur Mutsba, a member of the local Muslim community, and his wife Karin Nersesyan were shot dead on 2 July 2007 by an unknown gunman, in the yard of their rented house in the centre of Sukhumi. Mutsba was originally from Adzyubzha, Ochamchira District. Another murder took place on 17 August 2007 at around 13:00, when Khamzat Gitsba was killed in Gudauta along with Ufa resident Ruslan Assadulina. Gitsba was a member of the Spiritual Board of the Muslims of Abkhazia and an informal leader of Muslims in Gudauta. Gitsba died on the site of the shooting and Assadulina died in hospital. The masked killer had shot the pair through a lowered back window of a Chrysler stolen a few days earlier, using a machine gun with suppressor. The burning wreck of the car was found later on the outskirts of town. The death of Gitsba, who had fought against Georgians during the 1992-1993 war and who had been among the pro-Chechen hijackers of the Turkish passenger ship MV Avrasya in 1996, as well as other perceived anti-Muslim violence led to serious concerns by the Abkhaz Muslim community about their security. A similar incident took place in Gudauta on 8 October 2010, in which 34-year-old Arsaul Pilia was shot dead outside the mosque in a drive-by shooting. The car involved, a Volkswagen Touareg discovered to be registered to a resident of Khimki, Moscow Oblast, was found burned about an hour later, outside the village of Achandara, near Gudauta.

It was announced in June 2012 that, as part of the investigation of the February 2012 assassination attempt on President Alexander Ankvab, police had also reopened the case of the attempted assassination of the Imam of the Sukhumi Mosque Salikh Kvaratskhelia in July 2010. It was not established whether there was a connection to the killing in Gagra on 17 July 2010, of Emil Chakmach-ogly a member of the Spiritual Board of the Muslims of Abkhazia and a member of the Public Chamber of Abkhazia, he had previously been a Deputy of the People's Chamber of Abkhazia. Chakmach-ogly was shot in the courtyard of his home around 2:00, after returning from his shop.

=== Judaism ===
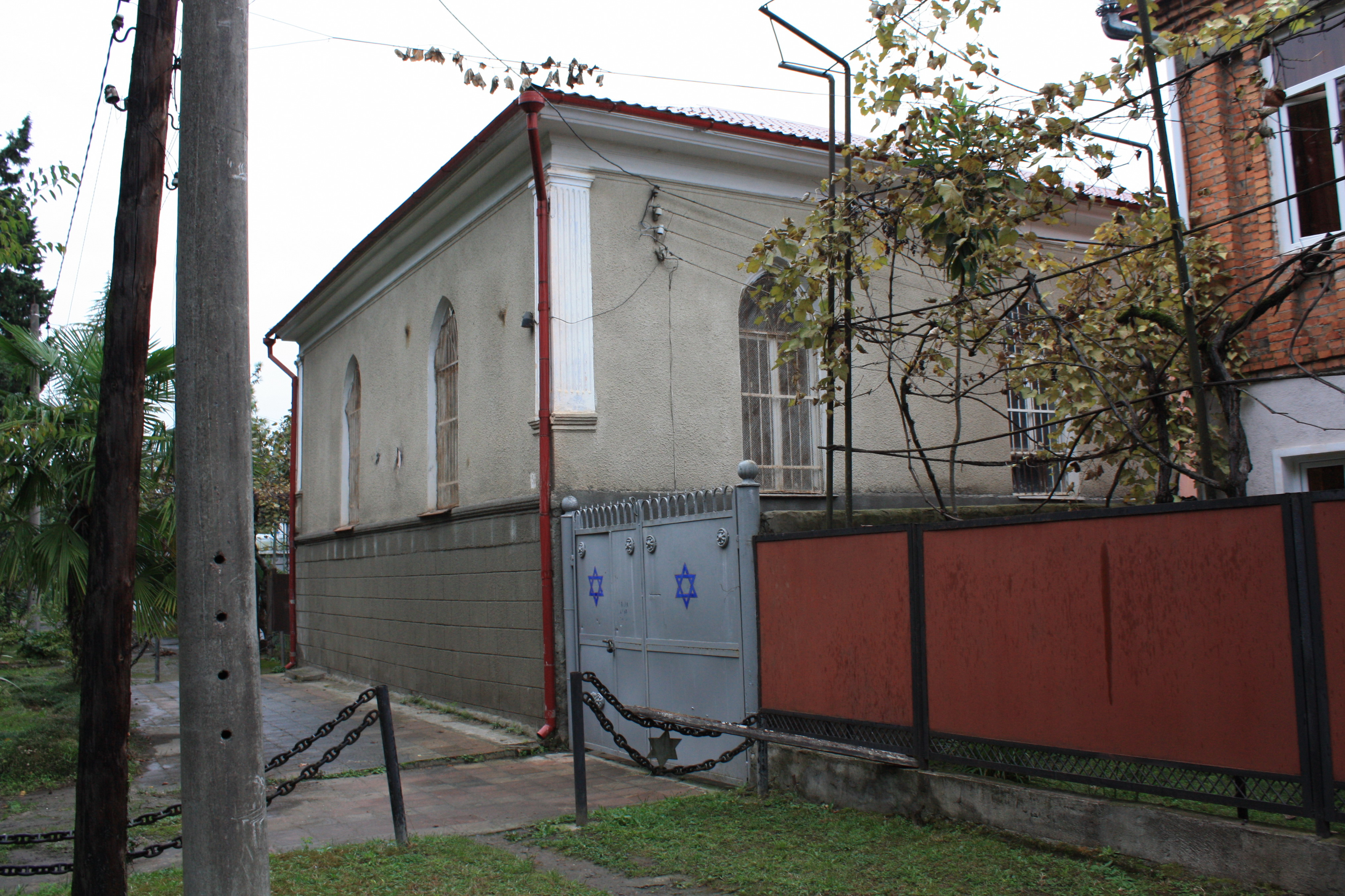
Synagogue in Sukhumi

During the 1992–93 war, the Georgian Jewish population fled Abkhazia. As of 2012, there were an estimated 100–200 Jews in Abkhazia. The remaining Jewish community of Abkhazia is mainly Ashkenazi. They use the 1958 Georgian synagogue in Sukhumi for their religious services.

== See also ==
- Religion in Georgia
- Religion in South Ossetia
