= Christianity in Abkhazia =

Aspect of religious life in Abkhazia

Christianity is a main religion in Abkhazia. The history of introduction of Christianity in the present-day Abkhazia can be traced to the 1st century and in 325 the bishop of Pityus participated in the First Ecumenical Council in Nicaea. Since the late 9th century, the Orthodox dioceses of Abkhazia were subordinated to the Georgian Orthodox Church, later functioning there as the Catholicosate of Abkhazia.

== Eastern Orthodox Church ==
The orthodox church in Abkhazia is officially part of the Georgian Apostolic Autocephalous Orthodox Church (Tskhum-Apkhazeti Eparchy) with Catholicos-Patriarch Ilia II as its head. After the Georgian-Abkhaz conflict, the autocephalous church of Georgia lost the control and jurisdiction over its property in Abkhazia. However, all autocephalous churches of the orthodox faith, including the Russian Orthodox Church and the Ecumenical Patriarchate of Constantinople, recognise Abkhazia as part of the Georgian autocephalous church. The Current head of the orthodox church in Abkhazia is Archbishop Daniel of Tskhum-Apkhazeti Eparchy However, the Georgian Orthodox Church is unable to operate there and most of its clerics as well as the parish have been expelled during the Abkhazian war and in its aftermath.

After the war in Abkhazia, the only remaining Orthodox priest of the Georgian Church, ethnic Abkhaz Vissarion (Appliaa) headed the local Orthodox community. In the following years, the recently consecrated clerics from the neighbouring Russian Maykop Eparchy arrived in Abkhazia and soon engaged in a conflict with Vissarion. Through the mediation of Russian church officials, the two sides managed to reach a power-sharing agreement at Maikop in 2005, and organised themselves into the Eparchy of Abkhazia whose canonical status remains undefined. This failed, however, to settle the disagreement and the eparchy continued to straddle the division. Currently, there are a dozen or so Orthodox clerics in the region, most of whom belong to the Russian Orthodox Church, while the de facto head of the eparchy, Vissarion, nominally remained a subordinate to the Georgian Orthodox Patriarchate.

The Georgian church officials complained that the Russian church interferes in Abkhazia by training and sending in priests loyal to Moscow. The Russian church officials published translations of the Gospels in Abkhazian, which drew protests from the Georgian Orthodox and Apostolic Church as a violation of Orthodox Church canon law, constituting a meddling in the internal affairs of another Orthodox church and annexation of Georgian Orthodox property in Abkhazia. The Russian Orthodox Church claimed that the clerics of Maykop eparchy serve in Abkhazia only temporarily as the local Orthodox believers do not have contacts with the Georgian Orthodox Church.

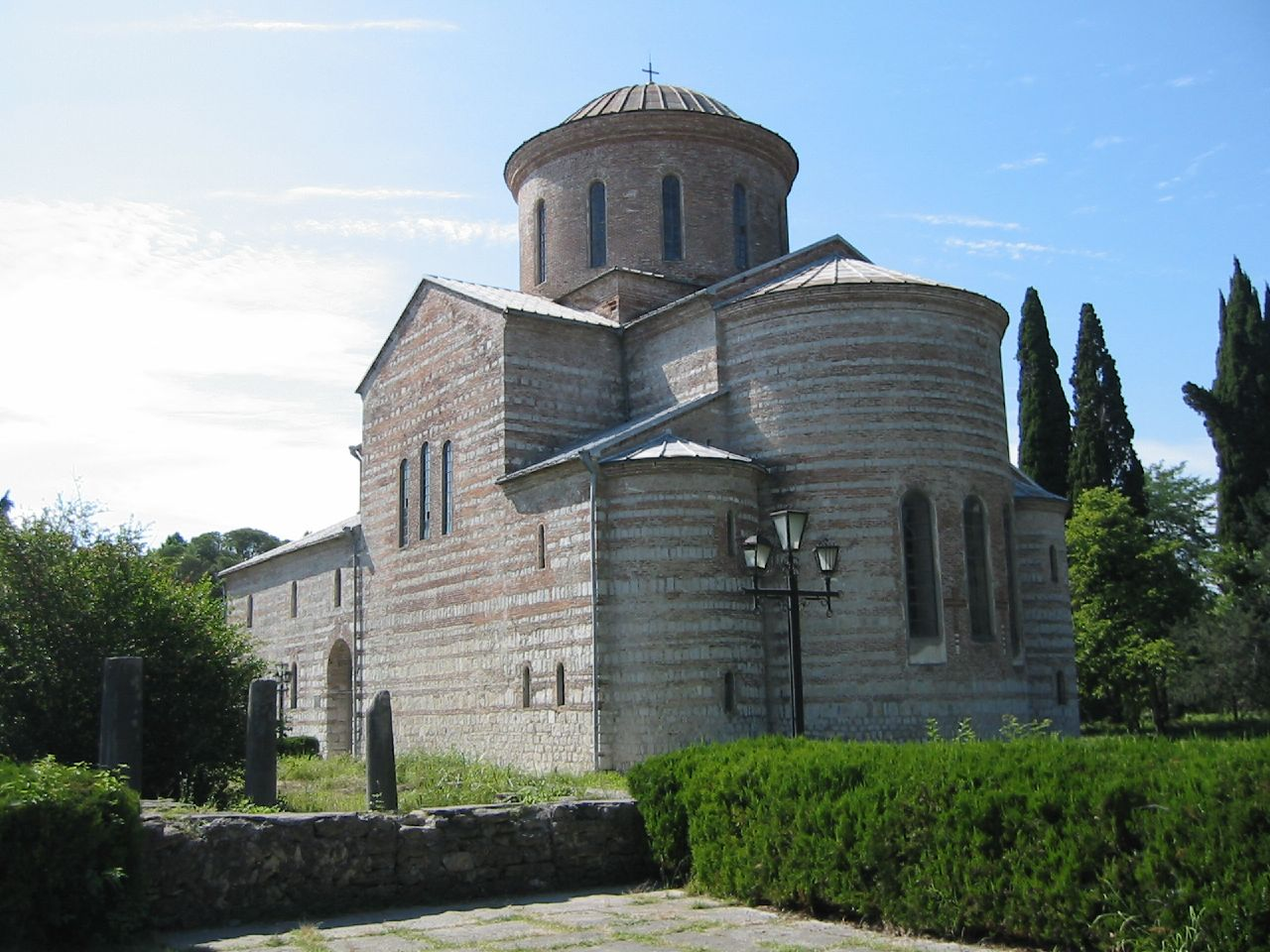
Pitsunda Cathedral, or St. Andrew the Apostle Cathedral, main seat of the Abkhazian Orthodox Church

On 15 September 2009 the leadership of the Sukhumi-Abkhazian Eparchy, against the authority of Ilia II, Catholicos Patriarch of All Georgia, declared that it no longer considered itself part of the Georgian Orthodox Church, and that it was re-establishing the Catholicate of Abkhazia, and that it would henceforth be known as the Abkhazian Orthodox Church.

Its leader Vissarion Aplia asked both the Russian and Georgian Orthodox churches to recognize the "Abkhazian Orthodox Church". A spokesman for the Georgian patriarchate said the decision to separate from the Georgian Orthodox Church was taken by a "group of impostors", while the Russian Orthodox Church confirmed that it continued to view Abkhazia as the canonical territory of the Georgian Church.

On 9 February 2011, the Abkhazian government transferred 38 churches, cathedrals and monasteries perpetually into the care of the Abkhazian Orthodox Church.

== Armenian Apostolic Church ==
Most of the ethnic Armenians living in Abkhazia who form the second largest ethnic group in the region of Abkhazia after the Abkhaz people, forming 20% of the Abkhazian population with 45,000 out of a total of 215,000, belong to the Armenian Apostolic Church.

== Catholic Church ==
The Catholic Church in Abkhazia is the third largest Christian denomination and mostly consists of mainly Armenians, Poles, and expatriates living in Abkhazia. The Holy See does not have diplomatic relations with Abkhazia, but has enjoyed two high level visits from the apostolic nuncio.

== Gallery ==
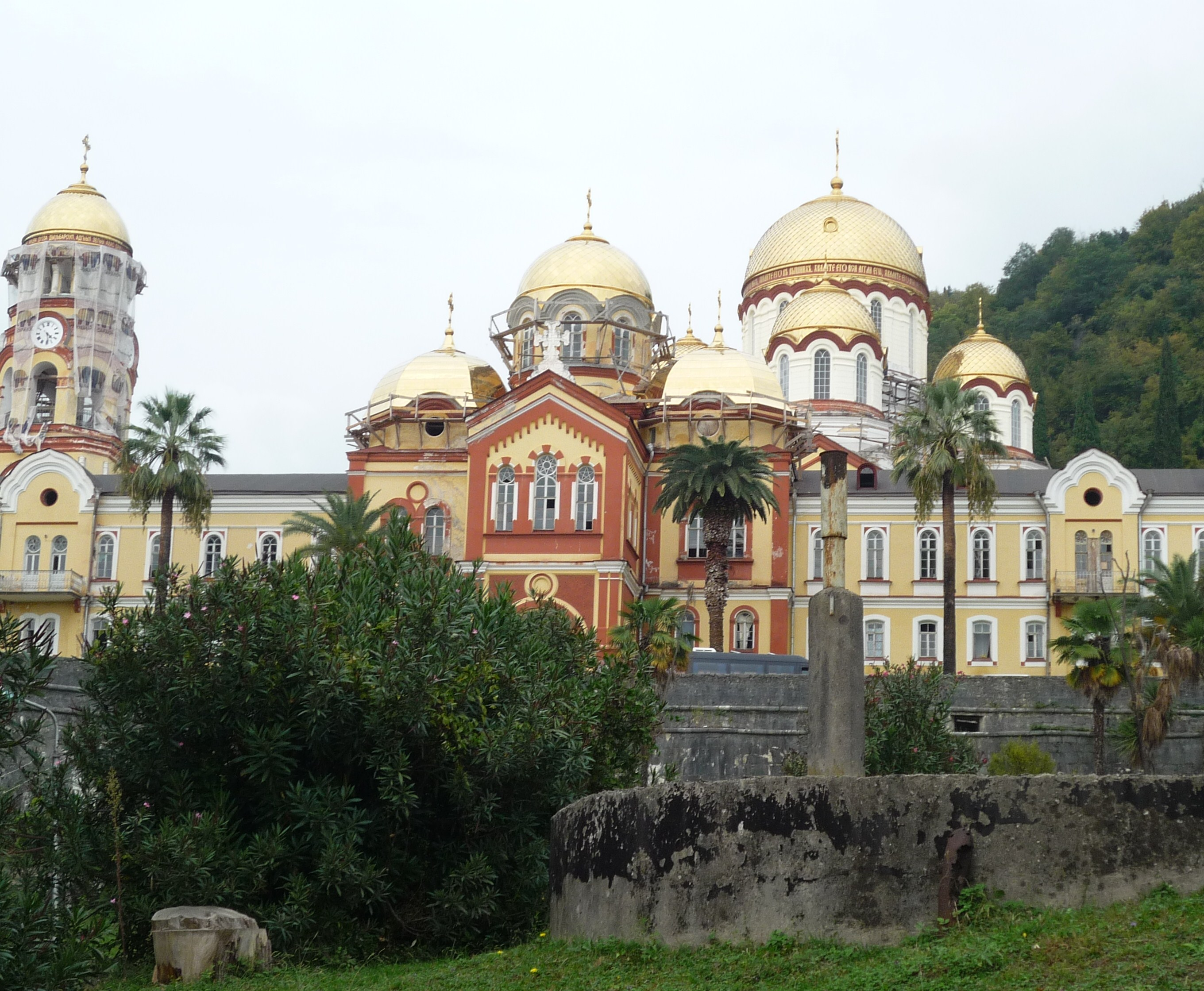
New Athos Monastery

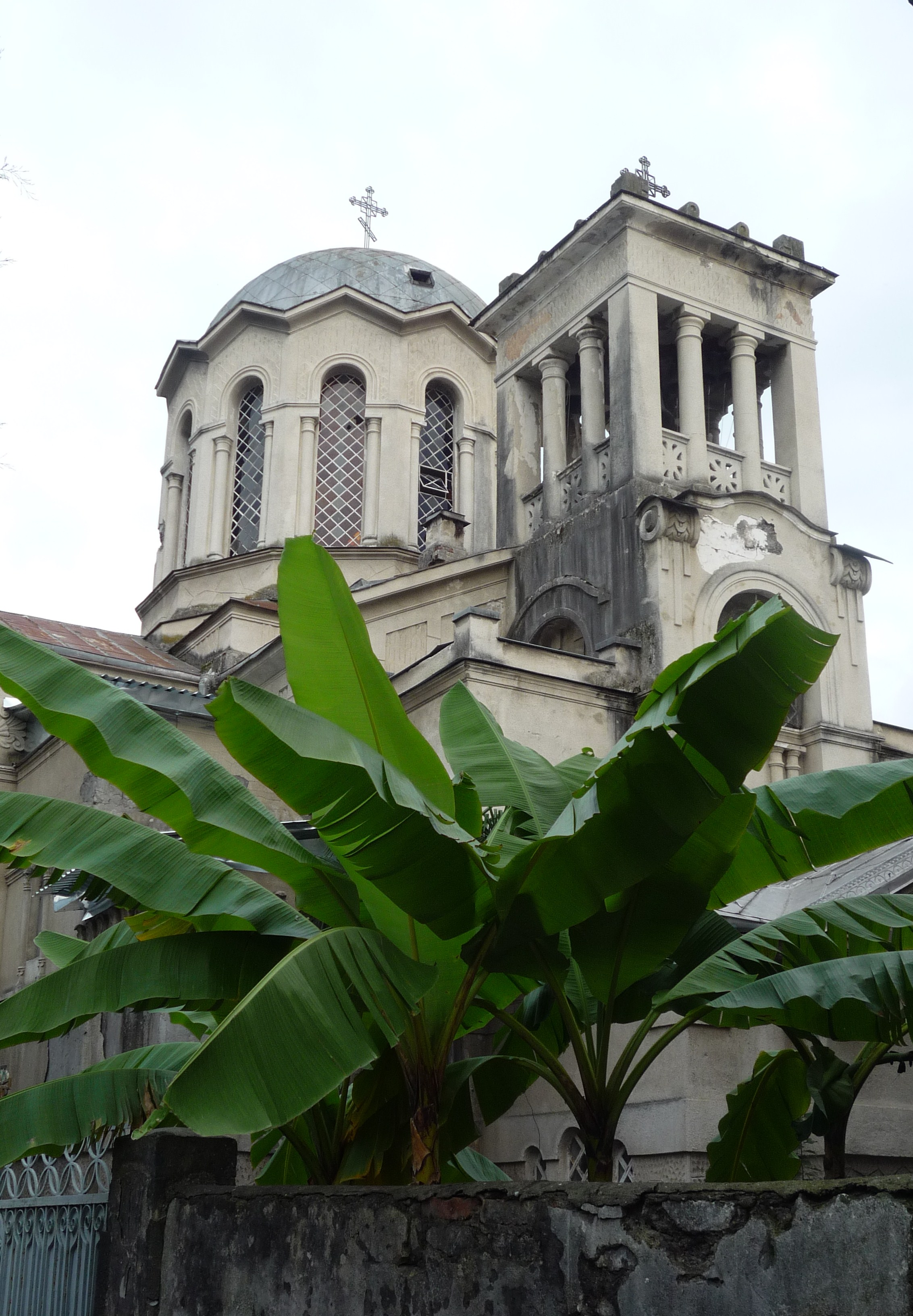
Church in Sokhumi

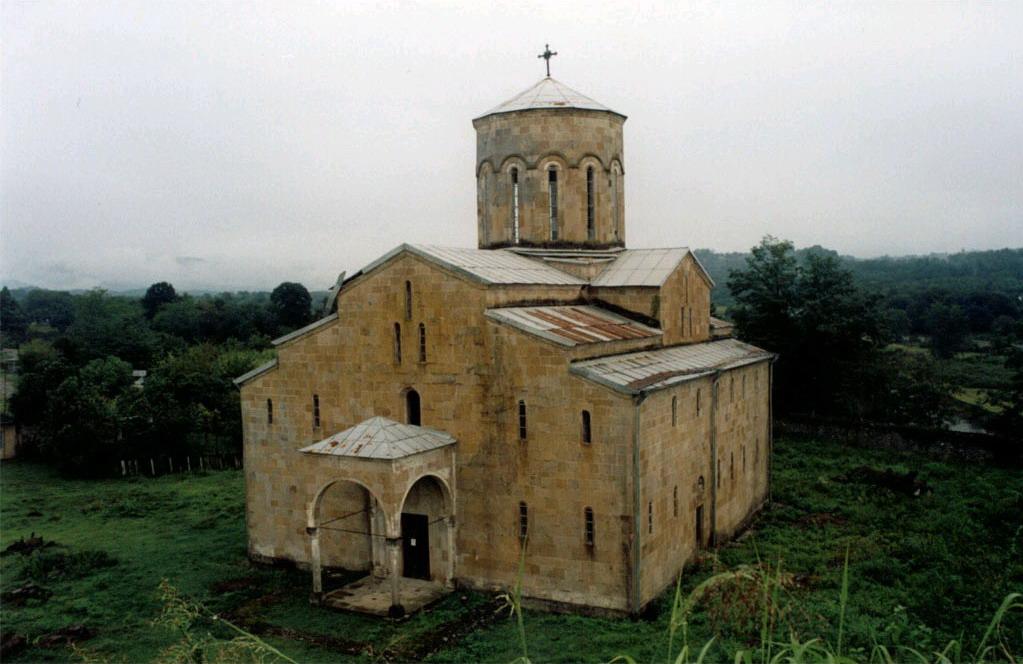
Mokvi cathedral

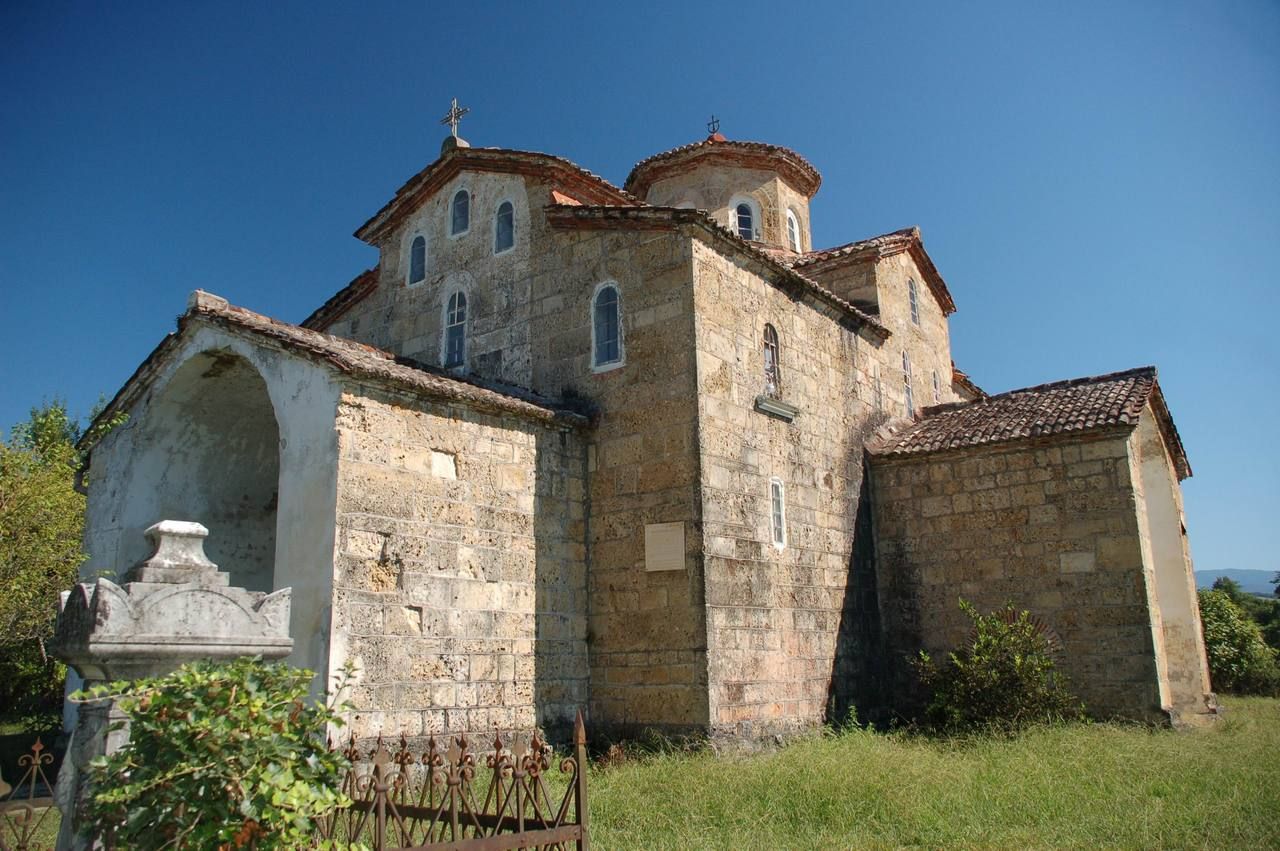
Likhni temple

== See also ==
- Estonians in Abkhazia
