= Assassination attempts on Alexander Ankvab =

Alexander Ankvab, who was a president of Abkhazia from 2011 to 2014, has survived six assassination attempts since becoming prime minister in 2005.

== February 2005 ==
Two weeks after having been appointed prime minister, Alexander Ankvab's car was fired upon in the evening of 28 February 2005. The car was reportedly hit by 17 bullets, but Ankvab was not harmed as he was traveling in the car of his vice-premier Leonid Lakerbaia. No injuries were reported. Newly elected president Sergei Bagapsh blamed the attack on "criminal elements" opposed to reform "who do not want to live in accordance to the law”. On 1 March, Ankvab ordered Interior Minister Otar Khetsia to crack down on criminal gangs, blaming the assassination attempt on people discontent with his decision to raise the taxes on the export of scrap metal.

== April 2005 ==
On 1 April, Ankvab's car was attacked again, near Sukhumi. Neither he nor Vice-Premier Lakerbaia was injured, but their driver was. The next day, the Interior Ministry offered a reward of 5000 dollars for information that would lead to the capture of the perpetrators. Interior Minister Otar Khetsia, declared that "the same forces" that had been behind the assassination attempt on 28 February were responsible . Head of the criminal investigation Jamal Gogia announced on 7 April that his team was considering three possible backgrounds for the organisers of the attack: corrupt businessmen unhappy with tighter government control, criminals dissatisfied with the announced step-up in crime fighting and the Georgian or some other special service wanting to destabilise Abkhazia.

== June 2007 ==
On 20 June, during a remote-control bomb detonated during a thunderstorm near New Athos. On 27 June, a group of academics, writers and journalists released a statement in which they claimed that it was generally known the bomb had been aimed at Alexander Ankvab and that it was immoral and dangerous to keep silent about it.

== July 2007 ==
Ankvab's car after assassination attempt

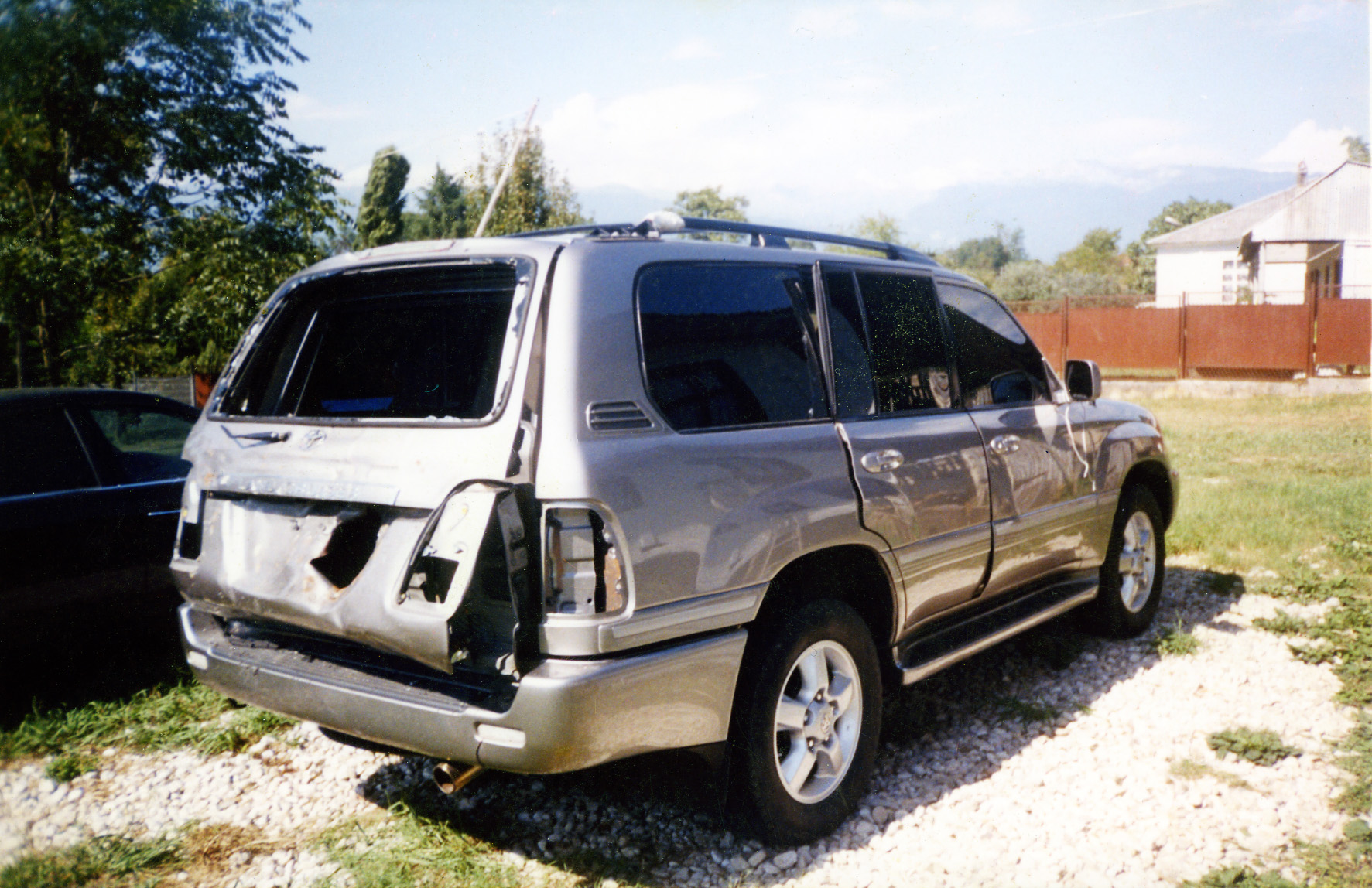
Right backside view

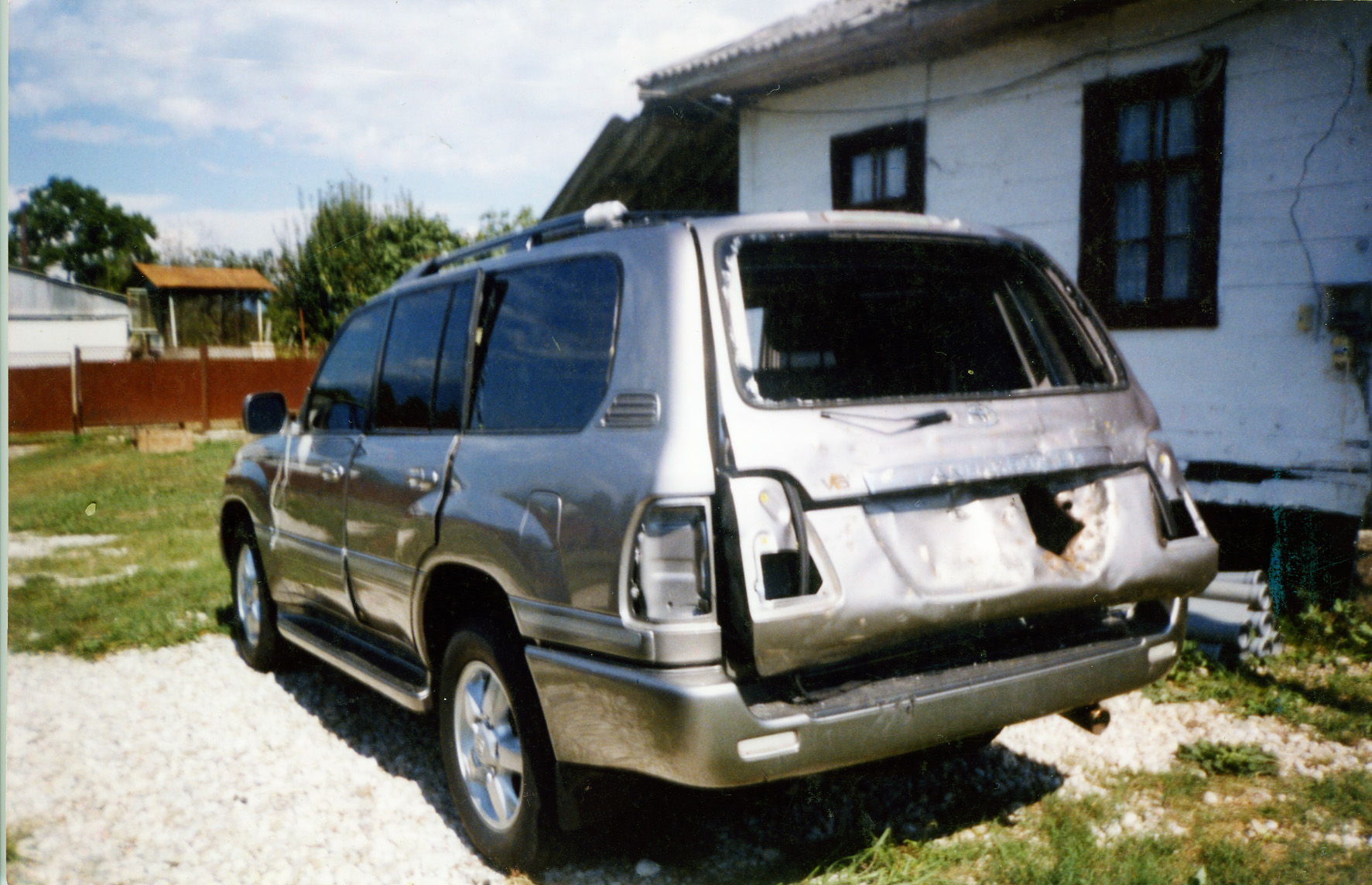
Left backside view

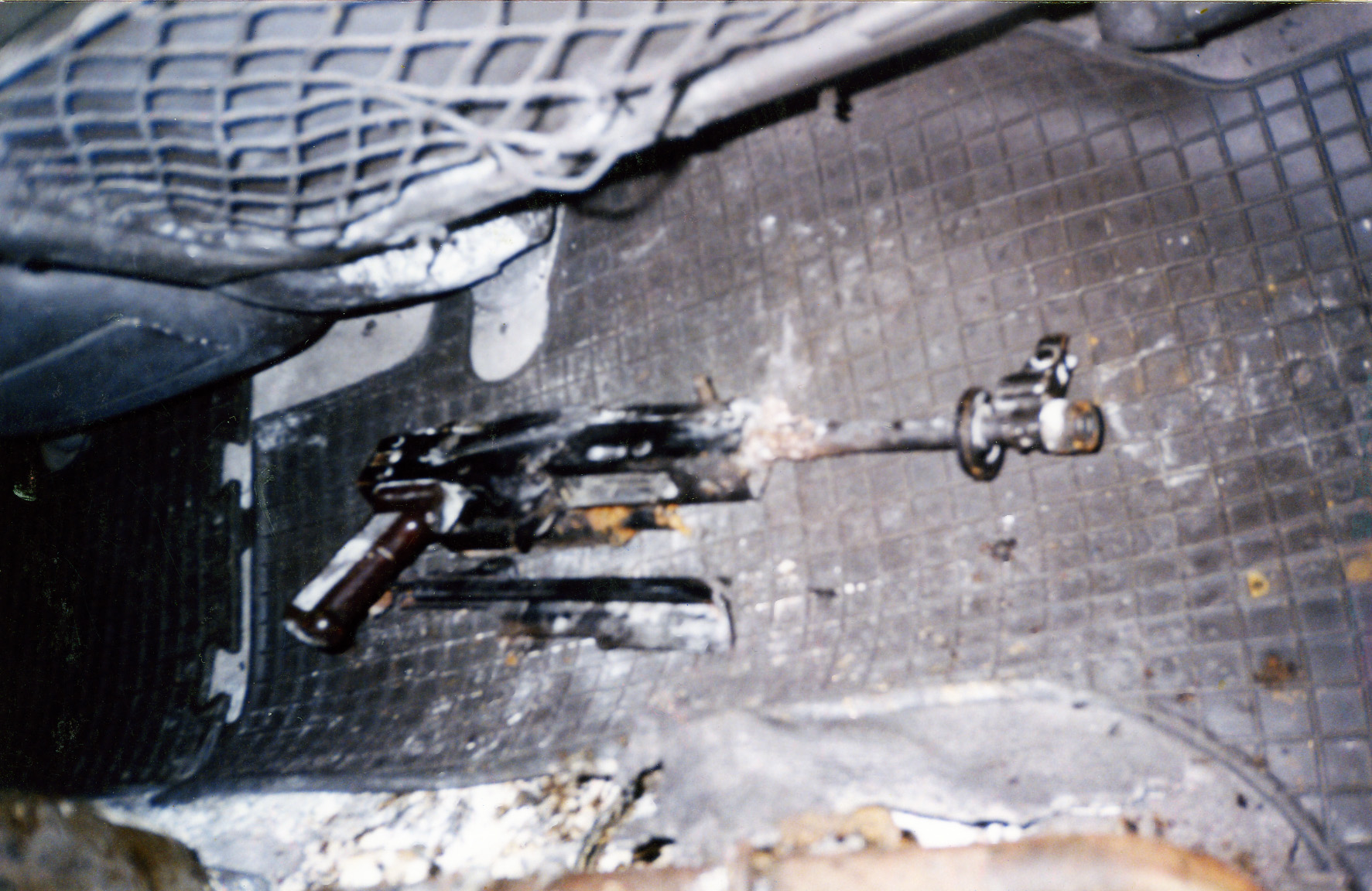
Burned rifle in the car

Hole made by RPG grenade

On July 9, 2007, Ankvab and his driver were lightly injured when the back of their vehicle was fired upon from a grenade cup discharger near Gudauta, on the road to Sukhumi. Ankvab stated that he had suffered a concussion and several shrapnel wounds to the back. President Bagapsh cut short a visit to Moscow after the attack. He blamed people opposed to reforms and the fight against organised crime for the attack, and added on 10 July that the attack was political in nature and not a settling of scores between criminals. He warned the leadership of the law enforcement agencies that they would be fired if results were not obtained within two weeks, and stated that the attack was a logical result of the agencies' failure to resolve the previous assassination attempts. The People's Assembly of Abkhazia called upon the government to timely investigate the attack and accused "destructive forces active both inside and outside Abkhazia" of trying to destabilize the situation in Abkhazia. The Interior Ministry proclaimed a 500,000-ruble reward for information leading to the capture of the attackers. Georgian MP Konstantine Gabashvili accused the Russian special services of trying to get rid of Ankvab, allegedly because he had suggested reexamining all illegal real estate transactions in Abkhazia, including those involving Russian companies.

On 16 July, Ankvab denied having given an interview to the Tbilisi-based newspaper Svobodnaya Gruzya, in which he allegedly accused the Georgian Ministry of Internal Affairs of being involved in the assassination attempts, and condemned the publication as unethical.

On 2 August, President Bagapsh announced that there was serious progress in the investigation, but cautioned that the investigation should be conducted carefully and scrupulously, and that everything needed to be proven with "150%" certainty.

== September 2010 ==
Alexander Ankvab was elected vice-president in December 2009 along with President Bagapsh.

On 23 September 2010, 2:15 am local time, a grenade was fired at Ankvab's house in Gudauta from a RPG-26 launcher. Ankvab received non-life-threatening injuries to his arm and leg. According to Deputy Chief Prosecutor Beslan Kvitsinia, the attack was related to Ankvab's work in government.

== August 2011 ==
On 29 May 2011, President Bagapsh died and Ankvab successfully contested the subsequent Presidential election.

According to prosecutors, an attack was planned on Ankvab during the 17 August 2011 meeting with voters in Alakhadzykh, Gagra District.

== November 2011 ==
According to prosecutors, an attack was staged on Ankvab in November 2011, in the Gudauta District village of Primorskoe, on the road to Aatse. The attack was aborted because the perpetrators had insufficient confidence in their escape routes.

== January 2012 ==
According to prosecutors, the same people then tried to kill Ankvab in January 2012 by letting a bomb explode in the Gudauta District village of Kulanyrkhua, but the bomb did not go off as planned.

== February 2012 ==
On 22 February 2012, Ankvab survived a mine and gun attack on his convoy in Kulanyrkhua, on the road from Gudauta to Sukhumi, which killed two of his guards.

== Arrests and indictments ==
=== First arrests and suicides of Almasbei Kchach and Timur Khutaba ===
On 12 April, six suspects were arrested for the assassination attempt in February, including well-known businessman Anzor Butba. Two were quickly released while the remaining four (Alkhas and Timur Khutaba, Ramzi Khashig and Butba) were brought before court on 14 April, receiving 2 months of pre-trial detention. On 17 April, police attempted to arrest former interior minister and vice presidential candidate Almasbei Kchach at his home in Gagra, but found him dead in an apparent suicide by firearm. The same day, police also arrested Murtaz Sakania in the village of Khypsta, Gudauta District. Khypsta tried to cut his throat but received no life-threatening injuries from the act. In the night from 17 to 18 April, one of the original suspects in pre-trial detention, Timur Khutaba, hanged himself in his prison cell.

On 20 April, the Sukhumi court issued pre-trial detention to Murtaz Sakania and the Supreme Court board of appeal confirmed the pre-trial detention of Anzor Butba. The lawyers of Alkhas Khutaba and Ramzi Khasig had withdrawn their appeals the eve before.

On 24 April, a purported suicide note of Almasbei Kchach was published online, provoking heated discussions on social networks and blogs. The message had been written on a napkin and contained grammatical and typographical mistakes. One crucial passage was difficult to read, and opinions were divided over whether the note implicated Kchach's guilt. According to unofficial inquiries by journalist Vitali Sharia, the note, contained in a coat pocket, had not been found during the official search of Kchach's properties, but at a later time by family members. On 2 May, the family of Kchach published an open letter in the weekly newspaper Novyy Den, in which it protested Kchach's innocence, stating amongst other things that he had requested a traditional oath ceremony in which he was to swear to his innocence. Kchach's family also decried the searching of his apartment and the removal of his body and his possessions in the absence of any family members.

=== Arrests in Duripsh ===
On 19 April, the Attorney General's office indicted Duripsh resident Edlar Chitanava in absentia, whom they suspected of involvement in both the July 2007 and the February 2012 assassination attempts. On 20 April, the Prosecutor's Office declared Rushbey Bartsits wanted, also native to Duripsh, and co-owner of a scrap metal plant founded by Anzor Butba. On 28 April, Edlar Chitanava was arrested. On 4 May, police arrested Edlar's brother Edgar Chitanava in the woods of the village Duripsh in the Gudauta District. In his possession they found a TT pistol, ammunition and a sleeping bag. On 8 May, the office of the prosecutor general released a press statement that on 5 May, police had arrested Tamaz Bartsits, whom they suspected of organising the July 2007 assassination attempt. On 7 May, the Sukhumi Court granted his preliminary detention until 10 May. The prosecutor's office also declared wanted Astamur Khutaba, a native of Blabyrkhua, Gudauta District. On 10 May, it was made public that Rustan Gitsba, a cousin of the Chitanava brothers, had also been arrest in the night from 4 to 5 May in Duripsh in a joint operation by the Security Services of Russia and Abkhazia. In the course of Rustan's arrest, the investigation uncovered a very large stash of weapons, including grenade launchers, anti-aircraft guns, explosivers and a flame-thrower. Rustan Gitsba is a brother of the imam Hamzat Gitsba, who had fought under Shamil Basayev during the 1992–1993 war with Georgia, participated in the January 1996 hijacking of the MV Avrasya and who was assassinated in Gudauta in August 2007.

=== Indictments ===
On 15 May, Akhas Khutaba, Ramzi Khashig and Anzor Butba were officially charged with the attempted murder of the Head of State, the attempted murder of law enforcement officers and membership of a criminal organisation. The prosecutor office also made public that on 14 May, it had placed Pavel Ardzinba on an international wanted list because it suspected him of organising the February 2012 (together with Kchach) and July 2007 assassination attempts on Alexander Ankvab. On 15 May, the court ordered Ardzinba's preliminary detention in absentia. Based on testimonies from some of the arrested suspects, the Prosecutor's Office also indicted Pavel Ardzinba for two assassination attempts on Pitsunda Mayor Beslan Ardzinba in September 2007 and June 2009.

On 22 May, police found six more weapons caches in the villages of Duripsh and Jirkhva, Gudauta District, based on the testimony of Rustan Gitsba.

On 12 June, the Sukhumi City Court granted a six-month extension of the pre-trial detention of Anzor Butba, Alkhas Khutaba, Ramzi Khashig and Murtaz Sakania. It also became known that as part of the case, police had re-opened investigations into the sabotage of railway tracks in Sukhumi on 9 August 2009, the attempted assassination of the Muslim cleric Salikh Kvaratskhelia on 10 July 2010 and the assassination of R. Tsotsoria on 5 July 2011.

=== Alleged Sochi 2014 terror plot ===
The Russian National Counter-Terrorism Council stated that Rustan Gitsba and the Chitanava brothers had formed a branch of the Caucasus Emirate called the 'Jamaat of Abkhazia', and that Gitsba had been its head. It further claimed that the group had meant to target the 2014 Olympic Winter Games in Sochi, that the investigation had been prompted by the discovery of empty weapons caches in the Sochi suburb of Plastunka and that the group had planned to move the weapons stash later in 2012. An anonymous member of Abkhazia's Security Council declared to the newspaper Kommersant that it was too early to say whether the group really wanted to attack the Winter Olympics, although this was being looked into. They claimed that the Security Council had established a link between the group and Almasbei Kchach. On 12 May, Secretary of the Security Council Stanislav Lakoba stated that the February 2012 assassination attempt had been organised to facilitate a coup d'état. According to Lakoba, a number of weapons from the stash had previously been smuggled to Sochi. In April, three Abkhazians had been convicted to prison sentences for weapon smuggling by the District Court in Adler. The Russian National Counter-Terrorism Council further claimed that the group's operation had been directly coordinated by Caucasus Emirate head Dokka Umarov, in close cooperation with the Georgian Security Service. It also linked the group to the arrest in February 2012 (and subsequent conviction) of a courier who had smuggled 300 detonators from Georgia. The alleged Georgian involvement was dismissed as 'utterly absurd' by Georgia's Deputy Foreign Minister Sergi Kapanadze on 10 May.

=== Finalisation of the indictments ===
On 5 July 2013, the Prosecutor's Office finalised its charges. It claimed that the February 2012 attack had been organised by Anzor Butba and Almasbei Kchach on behest of Pavel Ardzinba, that the latter had offered over 7 million ruble in reward, and that the accused had previously attempted to carry out their attack in November 2011 and January 2012. The Office also alleged that the July 2007 attack had been carried out by Edgar and Edlar Chitanava, and that Edgar Chitanava had been behind the August 2011 attempted attack on Ankvab and the June 2009 attack on Beslan Ardzinba, in both cases acting on orders of Pavel Ardzinba. Edlar Chitanava was accused of organising the September 2007 attack on Beslan Ardzinba. Moreover, Edgar Chitanava and Rustan Gitsba were accused of planting a bomb on railway tracks near Sukhumi in June 2009, on behest of the Caucasus Emirate.

On 22 March 2016, the Prosecutor's Office announced the sentences it was calling for. It requested life sentences for Alkhas and Astamur Khutaba and for Ramzi Khashig, 20 years imprisonment in a penal colony for Anzor Butba and Edgar and Edlar Chitanava, 16 years for Rustan Gitsba, 11 years for Tamaz Bartsits and 8 years for Murtaz Sakania. 20 years is the maximum sentence Butba may receive as he is over 65 years old, otherwise the Prosecutor's Office would also have requested a life sentence for him.
