= Erdinç Tekir =

Turkish hijacker (born 1966)

- Born: Erdinç Tekir; November 17, 1966
- Known for: Black Sea hostage crisis İHH activity

Erdinç Tekir (born November 17, 1966) is a Turkish member of the IHH of Abkhaz origin. He was previously convicted for his participation at the Black Sea hostage crisis. He worked for the IHH since he was released from prison and joined the Gaza Flotilla.

== Georgian–Abkhazian and Russian-Chechen conflicts ==
As a member of an Islamic youth organization named Milli Gençlik Vakfı, Tekir joined the group of Shamil Basayev in the Georgian–Abkhazian conflict with code name Hadjarat, in the summer of 1992. He wanted to go to Chechnya in 1994 to participate in the Chechen War, when he was a sergeant in the Abkhazian Army. Since he could not pass to Chechenya from Abkhazia, he used the way from Azerbaijan to Chechnya. He did not manage to go to Chechnya, as he was handed over to Russians and detained in a prison. However, he escaped from the prison and returned to Turkey where he participated in hijacking the ferryboat MV Avrasya in 1996. He was sentenced to eight years in prison in Turkey, but was released after serving three and a half years.

== As an IHH member ==
After being released from prison, Tekir joined İHH for its released prisoner quota and worked for several İHH campaigns, first as a volunteer, and then as an İHH employee. He was one of the İHH members aboard the ship Mavi Marmara during the 2010 Gaza flotilla raid. He was wounded by the IDF boarding party. Tekir told Hürriyet that the group that hijacked the ferryboat and the Israelis who boarded the Mavi Marmara were both pirates, but they were the pirates of goodness, whereas Israel was cruel. A spokesman for the Israeli Foreign Ministry issued a statement on Tekir's previous conviction for the hijacking, alleging "This shows what kind of people were on the ship."
