= Khamzat Gitsba =

Abkhaz hostage taker

Khamzat "Rocky" Gitsba was a participant in the 1996 hijacking of the MV Avrazya who was shot dead in 2007 in Gudauta.

== Early life and family ==
Khamzat Gitsba earned the nickname "Rocky" for his love of boxing, after the film character Rocky Balboa. Gitsba was a geography graduate from Abkhazian State University. He worked for some time in the high school in the village of Duripsh. Gitsba fought in the 1992-1993 war with Georgia under the command of Shamil Basayev. The Russian newspaper Kommersant reported that Gitsba's cousin married Basayev, but this has been denied by the Spiritual Board of the Muslims of Abkhazia.

== Hijacking of the MV Avrazya ==
Khamzat participated in the January 1996 hijacking of the MV Avrasya. In May 2006, he declared in an interview that it had been an act of desperation, meant to attract world attention and to stop the war in Chechnya, and that they had only used fake explosives and a hunting rifle.

== Return to Abkhazia and murder ==
After being released from prison, Khamzat Gitsba returned to Abkhazia and became a member of the Spiritual Board of the Muslims of Abkhazia and an informal leader of Muslims in Gudauta. On 17 August 2007, around 13:30, Gitsba was shot in the centre of Gudauta, along with Ufa resident Ruslan Assadulina. Gitsba died on the site of the shooting, aged 37. The masked killer had shot the pair through a lowered back window of a Chrysler stolen a few days earlier, using a machine gun with suppressor. After the attack, the police was unable to follow the perpetrator, about half an hour later it found the burning wreck of the car on the outskirts of town.
