= Muhammed Tokcan =

Muhammed Tokcan (Abkhaz name Tug-ipa), (born 1969, in Gebze), was one of the hijackers arrested for the hijacking of the Avrasya in 1996.

The leader of the militants, Muhammed Tokcan, escaped from the prison in Dalaman on October 6, 1997. Tokcan was arrested again at Atatürk Airport in Istanbul on April 29, 1999, as he tried to flee to Sochi under a false passport. He was paroled on December 22, 2000. On April 22, 2001, just before midnight, a group of 12 militants led by Tokcan (who was still on parole), seized the Swissotel in Istanbul and took hostages to draw attention to the new war in Chechnya. The crisis ended again without bloodshed when all gunmen surrendered after 12 hours. Tokan led a group of gunmen who forced their way into the lobby of the luxury hotel firing automatic rifles and pump-action shotguns and demanding an audience with Interior Minister Saadettin Tantan.
