= Catholic Church in Abkhazia =

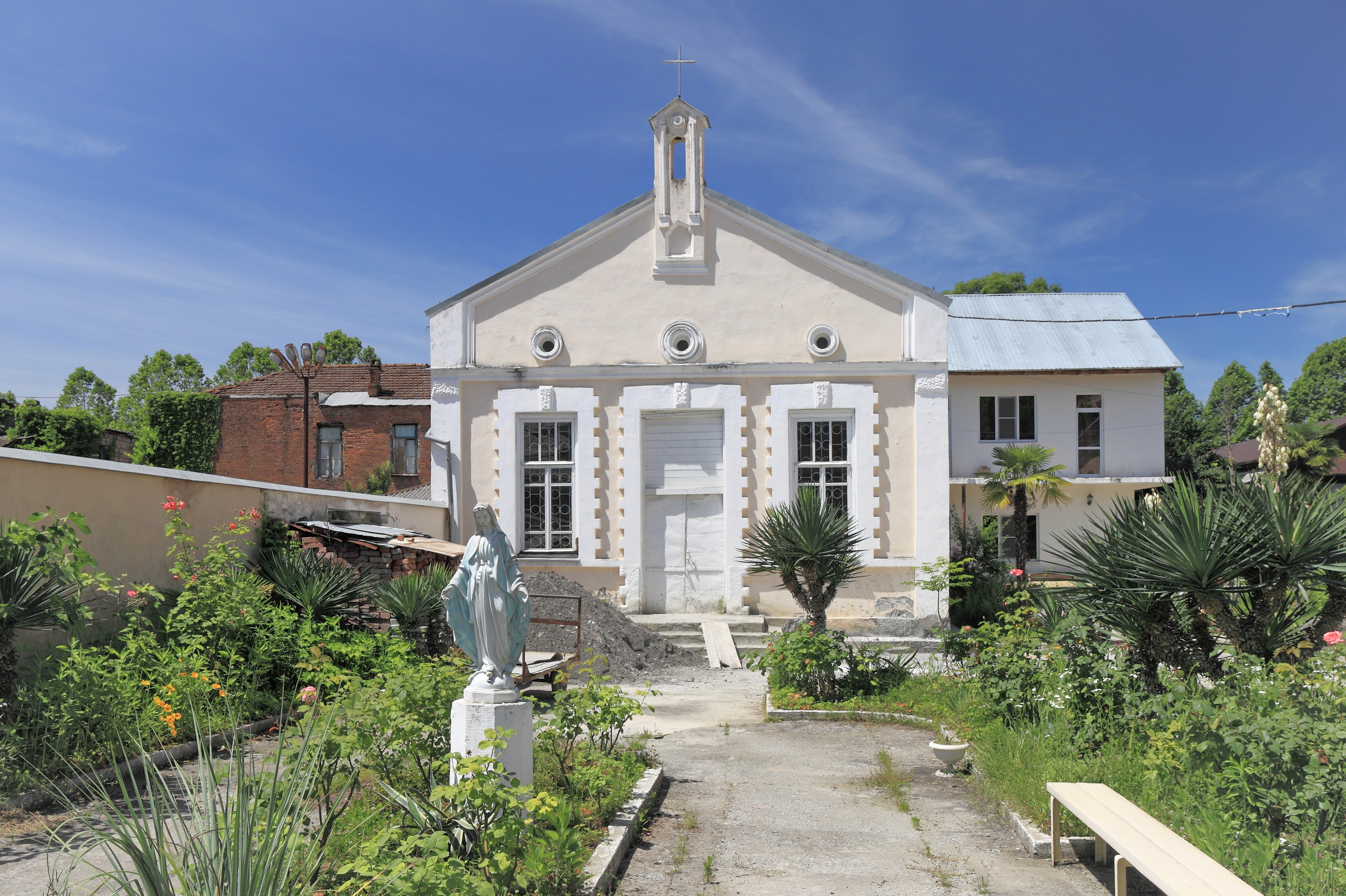
Catholic Church of St. Simon the Zealot in Sukhumi

The Catholic Church in Abkhazia is the third largest Christian denomination in the territory of the Republic of Abkhazia (Note: The political status of Abkhazia is disputed. Having unilaterally declared independence from Georgia in 1992, Abkhazia is formally recognised as an independent state by 5 UN member states (two other states previously recognised it but then withdrew their recognition), while the remainder of the international community recognizes it as de jure Georgian territory. Georgia continues to claim the area as its own territory, designating it as Russian-occupied territory.), which is part of the worldwide Catholic Church in communion with the Pope. Most Christians in Abkhazia are Orthodox. Due to Abkhazia's partial recognition, administration of Catholics comes from Catholic dioceses in Russia. The Catholic Church in Abkhazia mainly consists of Armenians, Poles, and expatriates living in Abkhazia. The Holy See does not have diplomatic relations with Abkhazia, but has enjoyed two high level visits from the apostolic nuncio.

== History ==
In the 13th and 14th centuries Genoese merchants established their trading enterprises in Abkhazia. With the merchants, came missionaries of various Catholic religious orders. The presence of the Catholic Church in Abkhazia is closely linked to the history of Catholicism in Georgia. In 1240 Pope Gregory IX sent missionaries of the monastic order of Franciscans to the Georgian Queen Rusudan. In 1328 Pope John XXII established a Latin Diocese in Tiflis, which included territory of Abkhazia. It was abolished in 1507.

On 8 November 1632, Catholics living in Abkhazia were annexed to the jurisdiction of the Bishop of Isfahan. In the 16th century Armenian Catholics, who were under the care of the Armenian Catholic Church, began to settle on the territory of Abkhazia. In 1626, missionaries arrived in Georgia from the Theatine monastic order who stayed in Georgia until 1700. After the annexation of eastern Georgia in 1783 by the Russian Empire, the Russian government expelled Carmelites, who had been in the country since 1661. In 1850, Abkhazian Catholics were under the jurisdiction of the Diocese of Tiraspol. In the second half of the 19th century, after the uprisings in Poland, Polish exiles immigrated and founded numerous Catholic communities in Abkhazia. In 1908, they built a small Catholic church in honor of St. Simon the Canaanite in Sukhumi, which survives to this day.

After the establishment of Georgian SSR in 1921, many Abkhazian Catholics faced persecution by Soviet authorities. Sukhumi's St. Simon's Church was closed in the period. Official persecution lasted until 1993. After the Abkhaz War, in 1993, Abkhazian Catholics could no longer be served by priests from Georgia and were transferred to the pastoral care of Diocese of Saint Clement at Saratov. Bogdan Severin of Apostles Simon and Thaddeus Parish of made period visits to Sukhumi from Sochi, providing pastoral guidance and charitable assistance to local Catholics. At the time, Catholic Masses were celebrated in club premises of Sukhumi Botanical Garden. In 1996, Church of St. Simon the Canaanite was returned to the Catholic community and regular worship in the premises remains since.

As of 2006, the Catholic community of Abkhazia numbers circa 150 people of whom about 80 reside in Sukhumi. Small communities are also recognised in Gagra and Pitsunda. Most of them are ethnic Armenians and Poles. In Sukhumi, parishioners are served by Fr. Jerzy Pillas and charitable services are provided by Caritas. Due to partial and disputed international and canonical status of Abkhazia, the Catholics are served by the Apostolic Administration of the Caucasus. Papal nuncio Claudio Gugerotti visited to Abkhazia twice – in October 2005 and in January 2006 – to meet with government representatives. Currently, there are no diplomatic relations between the Holy See and Abkhazia. The Government of Abkhazia recognised the Catholic community's ownership and claim to St. Simon the Zealot's Church in Sukhumi and recognised the historic and cultural significance as part of Abkhazian heritage in 2011.

== See also ==
- Religion in Abkhazia
