= Salikh Kvaratskhelia =

Abkhazian religious leader

Salikh (Stanislav) Kvaratskhelia is the current First Mufti and Chairman of the Spiritual Board of the Muslims in Abkhazia. He was elected on 19 December 2011 during the Board's fourth congress, after the death of his predecessor Adlia Gablia.

== Assassination attempt ==
On 10 July 2010, when he was Imam of the Sukhumi Mosque, an attempt was made on Kvaratskhelia's life. Around 16:30, during an inspection near the Kelasuri railway station on the Kodori road, a bomb was discovered attached to bottom of his VAZ-2107, which also contained three women and two children. The bomb was defused by employees of HALO Trust.

On 12 June 2012, it became known that as part of the investigation of the perpetrators of the February 2012 assassination attempt on President Alexander Ankvab, police had also re-opened the case of Kvaratskhelia's attempted assassination.
