= Pitsunda Cathedral =

Eastern Orthodox cathedral in Pitsunda, Abkhazia, Georgia

St. Andrew the Apostle Cathedral
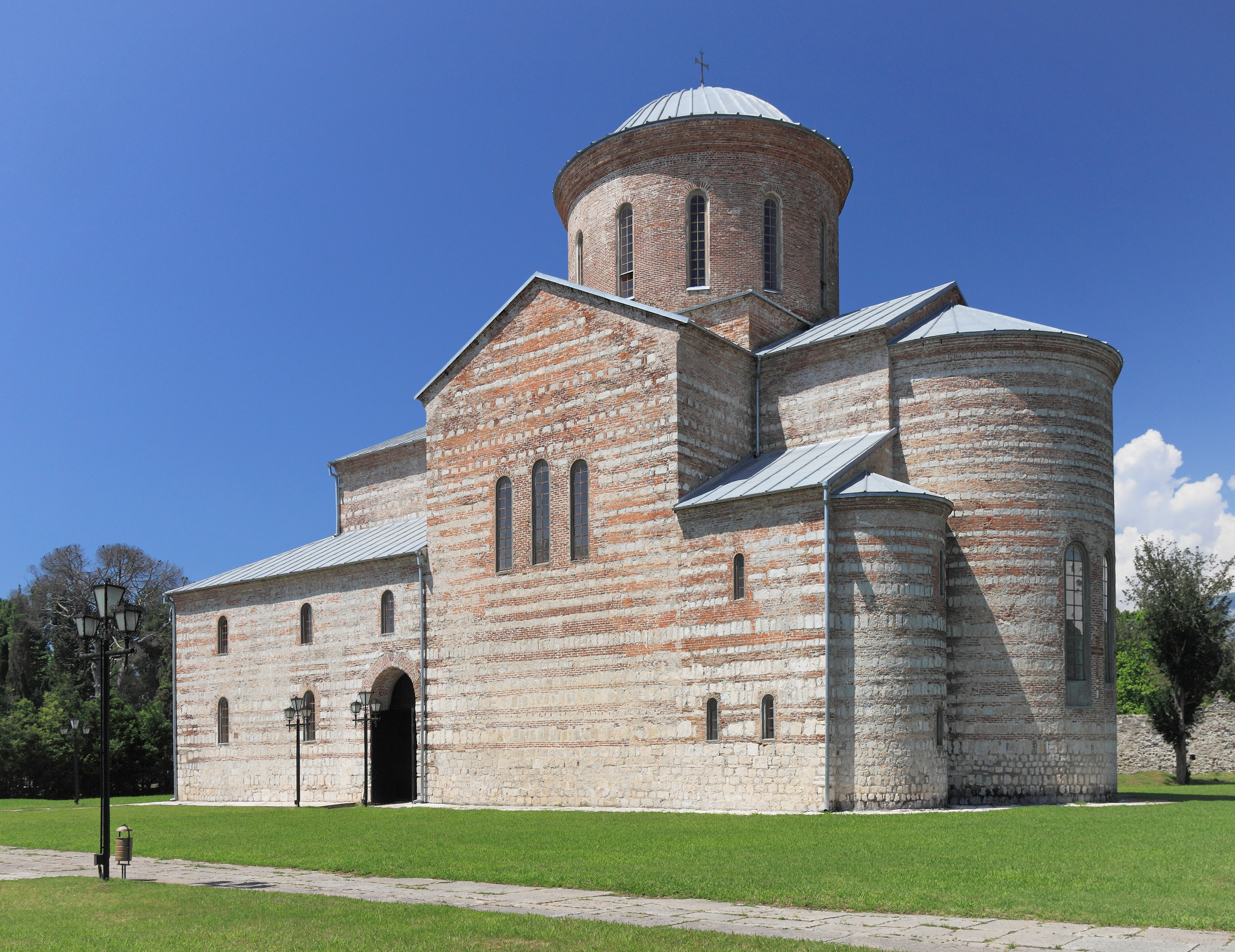

- Location within Georgia Location within Abkhazia

Religion
- Affiliation: de facto: Abkhazian Orthodox Church de jure: Georgian Orthodox Church (Note: See here: Orthodoxy in Abkhazia)
- District: Gagra District
- Region: Caucasus
- Status: Active

Location
- Location: Pitsunda, Gagra District, Georgia/Abkhazia (Note: The political status of Abkhazia is disputed. Having unilaterally declared independence from Georgia in 1992, Abkhazia is formally recognised as an independent state by 4 UN member states (three other states previously recognised it but then withdrew their recognition), while the remainder of the international community recognizes it as de jure Georgian territory. Georgia continues to claim the area as its own territory, designating it as Russian-occupied territory.)
- Coordinates: 43.159889°N 40.339°E

Architecture
- Type: Triple-nave, domed cruciform plan
- Style: Georgian; Byzantine
- Funded by: King Bagrat III of Georgia
- Completed: End of 10th century

Specifications
- Length: 37
- Width: 25
- Height (max): 29
- Dome: 1
- Immovable Cultural Monument of National Significance of Georgia
- Official name: Bichvinta monastery
- Designated: November 7, 2006; 19 years ago
- Reference no.: 3583
- Item Number in Cultural Heritage Portal: 9067
- Date of entry in the registry: October 3, 2007; 18 years ago

Website
- Pipe organ of Pitsunda

The Cathedral of St. Andrew the Apostle (Russian: Собор в честь Апостола Андрея Первозванного, romanized: Sobor v chest' Apostola Andreya Pervozvannogo), also known as the Pitsunda Cathedral (Abkhaz: Пицундатәи ауахәама, romanized: Ṗicundaṭ°i awax°ama) or Bichvinta Cathedral (Georgian: ბიჭვინთის ტაძარი, romanized: bich'vintis t'adzari) is an Eastern Orthodox Cathedral located in Pitsunda, in the Gagra District of the de facto independent Republic of Abkhazia, internationally recognised as constituting a part of Georgia. The cathedral is currently used by the schismatic Abkhazian Orthodox Church and serves as that body's seat, although this usage is disputed by the Georgian Orthodox Church and is considered irregular by the Eastern Orthodox communion generally.

Pitsunda Cathedral was built at the end of the 10th century by King Bagrat III of Georgia. It served as the seat of the Georgian Orthodox Catholicate of Abkhazia until the late 16th century when Abkhazia came under the Ottoman hegemony. According to 17th century French traveller Jean Chardin, Catholicos, who no longer lived in Pitsunda, visited the cathedral once a year with the retinue of bishops and princes to perform the sanctification of chrism. The cathedral was reconsecrated in 1869 when Abkhazia was already a part of Russian Empire.

It is a cross-domed cathedral with three naves and three apses, shaped as a rectangle with extending semicircular apses. It holds a pipe organ from the Alexander Schuke factory in Potsdam, Germany, installed in 1975. The cathedral is notable for its impressive size, reaching 29 m high (including the dome), 37 m long and 25 m wide; the walls are up to 1.5 m thick. The building rests on heavy slabs of grey sandstone; the walls are made up of alternating rows of stone and brickwork, a typical technique for late Byzantine architecture. The cathedral contains vestiges of wall-painting from the 13th and the 16th centuries. A 12th-century Georgian manuscript of the Four Gospels, found at the cathedral in 1830, is now preserved at the Georgian National Center of Manuscripts in Tbilisi.

== Gallery ==
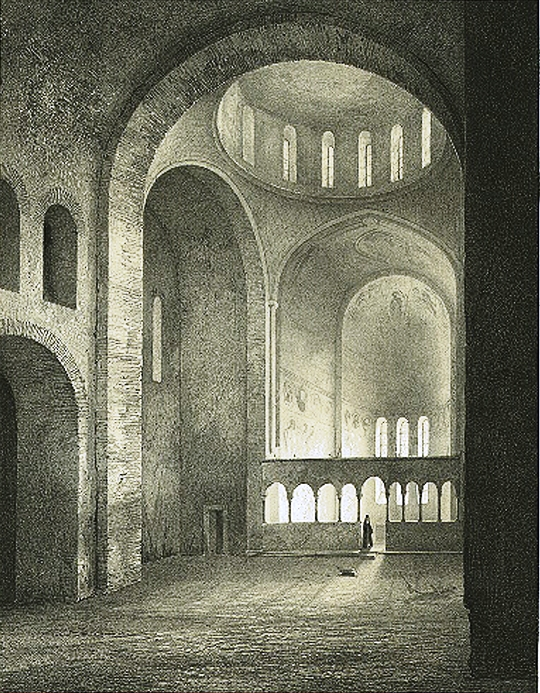
The Pitsunda Cathedral in 1847. Drawing by Grigory Gagarin

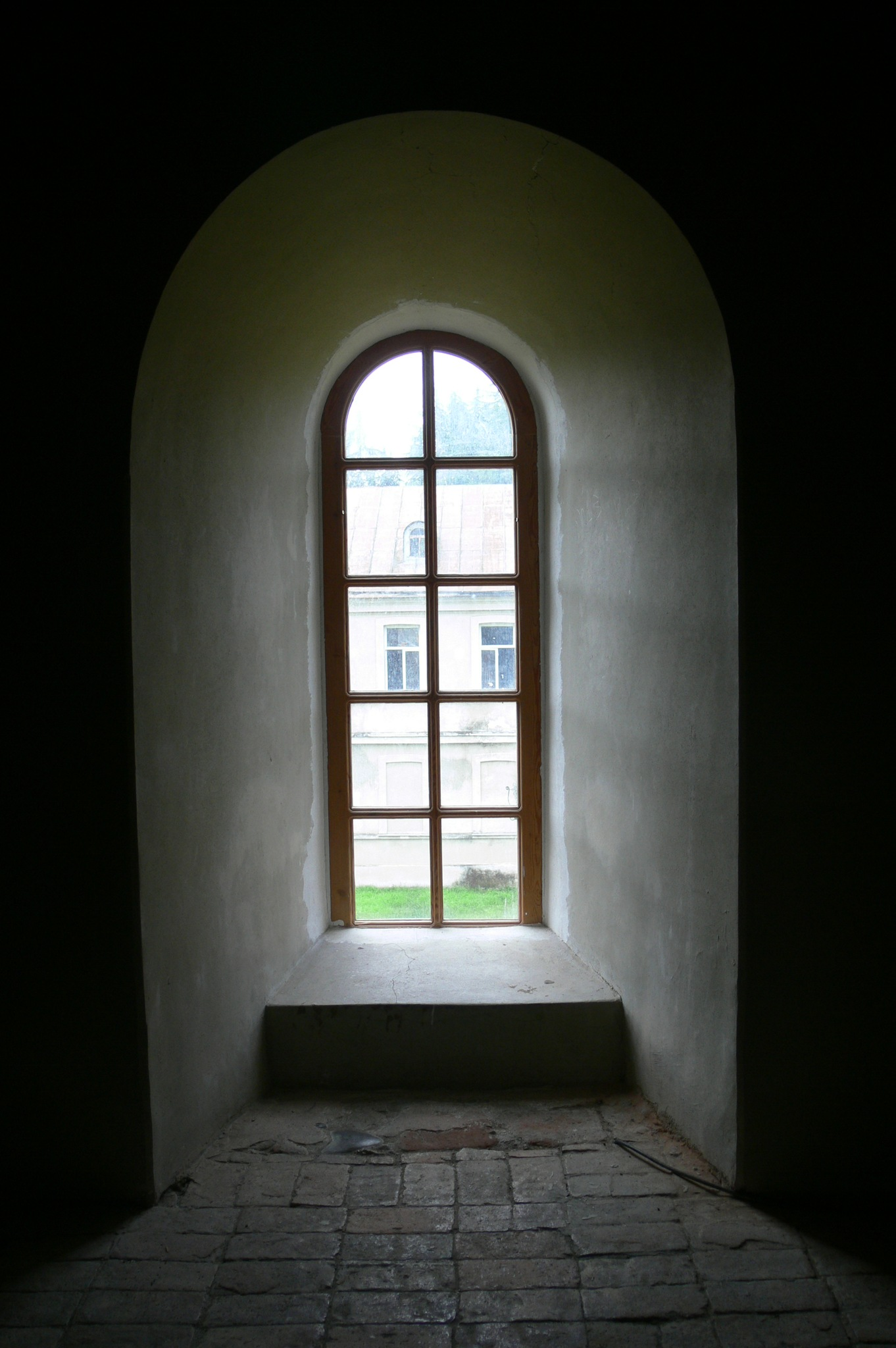
Cathedral window

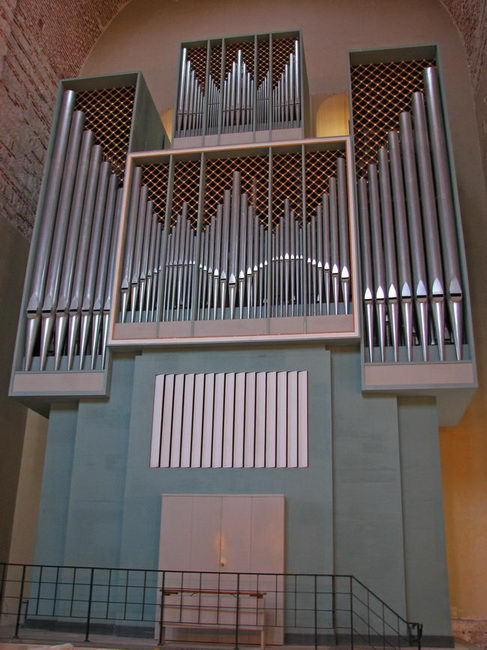
Cathedral organ
