= Sergi Kapanadze =

Georgian politician and academic

- Born: 25 April 1981 (age 45)
- Occupations: Think tank GRASS - founder and former director (2012-2016) Member of Parliament (2016-2020) Deputy Foreign Minister (2011-2012)

Sergi Kapanadze (Georgian: სერგი კაპანაძე) is a Georgian academic and former member of Parliament.

Sergi Kapanadze was a deputy speaker of Georgia's Parliament, in 2016-2020. Since 2021 he rejoined the think tank GRASS (Georgia's Reforms Associates) which he founded in 2012. In 2011-2012 he was a deputy foreign minister of Georgia. He also worked for the Foreign Ministry from 2005 until 2012. He has served as the Dean of the School of Governance at Caucasus University (2013-2016) and a director of GRASS (2012-2016). He was a prominent member of the Movement for Liberty - European Georgia opposition party, but left the party in 2021. He is also a Professor of international relations at the Ilia State University and former professor at the Tbilisi State University. He held a Jean Monnet Chair at the Caucasus University.

Sergi Kapanadze was born in Chiatura, Georgia on April 25, 1981. He received BA in International Relations in 2002 from the Tbilisi State University, Master of International Relations and European Studies in 2003 from Central European University in Budapest and a PhD in International Relations from Tbilisi State University in 2010.
