= Black Sea hostage crisis =

1996 ship hijacking

- Location: Trabzon, Turkey and the Black Sea
- Date: 16 – 19 January 1996 (3 days)
- Target: MS Avrasaya
- Attack type: Hostage crisis
- Deaths: None
- Injuries: 13 (including sicknesses)

The Black Sea hostage crisis took place January 16–19, 1996 on the Black Sea during the First Chechen War. The Panamanian-registered ferry Avrasaya with 177 passengers and 55 crew members on board was hijacked in the Turkish port of Trabzon by an international armed group, which threatened to kill the more than 100 Russian passengers unless the Russian forces ceased its attack against the Chechen separatists in the Kizlyar-Pervomayskoye hostage crisis.

The crisis ended without bloodshed after three days with the safe release of more than 219 unharmed captives; 13 people were hospitalized because of illness and injuries.

== Hijacking ==
The hijackers were five Turkish nationals of Caucasian origin, Muhammed Emin Tokcan, Tuncer Özcan, Sedat Temiz, Erdinç Tekir, Ertan Coşkun, Ceyhan Mollamehmetoğlu, an ethnic Abkhaz from Abkhazia, Khamzat Gitsba, and two Chechens, Ramazan Zubareyev and Viskhan Abdurrahmanov. The group took over the ship as it was about to depart from the Turkish port of Trabzon en route to Eregli and then to Sochi in Russia. The port security supervisor was shot in the foot during the hijacking and the route was changed to Istanbul.

The hijackers announced they were planning the destruction of the ship in order to draw attention to Chechnya's plight. They also threatened to blow it up together with the 114 Russian hostages if the Russian forces did not halt their ongoing offensive operation against a large group of Chechen fighters led by Salman Raduyev, surrounded with about 200 civilian and police hostages in the village of Pervomayskoye at the border between Chechnya and the Russian republic of Dagestan. Dozens of people were killed when the Russian FSB and military attempted to storm and then shelled Pervomayskoye; on the night (before dawn) of January 18 the Chechens fought their way through the Russian encirclement in a bloody breakout.

The Turkish authorities, ignoring Russian demands that they act more forcefully, avoided further bloodshed and liberated all hostages through constant communication and negotiations with the captors. The ship arrived at the northern entrance to the Bosporus on January 19, 1996, at around 12:00 hours, after the end to the fighting at Pervomayskoye. At 17:00 hours the same day, four of the militants surrendered to the authorities after throwing their weapons and bombs into the sea. The remaining members of the group tried to hide among the passengers without success.

== Aftermath ==
On March 7, 1997, the hijackers were sentenced to more than eight years in prison. Abdurrahmanov escaped on October 4 from the State Hospital in Bursa. On October 21, Zubarayev, Gitsba and Özcan also escaped from prison. Gitsba had later been reportedly shot dead coming out of a mosque in Gudauta, Abkhazia, on August 17, 2007.

The leader of the militants, Muhammed Tokcan, escaped from the prison in Dalaman on October 6, 1997. Tokcan was arrested again at Atatürk Airport in Istanbul on April 29, 1999, as he tried to flee to Sochi under a false passport. He was paroled on December 22, 2000. On April 22, 2001, just before midnight, a group of 12 militants led by Tokcan (who was still on parole), seized the Swissôtel in Istanbul and took hostages to draw international attention to the new war in Chechnya. The crisis ended when all gunmen surrendered after just 12 hours, again without bloodshed.

Erdinç Tekir had been an İHH employee for two years following a decade of volunteering for the organization. Tekir was aboard the MV Mavi Marmara as a member of İHH during the 2010 Gaza flotilla raid, wounded by the IDF boarding party. Tekir told Hürriyet that the group that hijacked the ferryboat and the Israelis who boarded the Mavi Marmara were both pirates, however they were the pirates of goodness, whereas Israel was cruel.

== See also ==
- Achille Lauro hijacking
- City of Poros ship attack
