= MV Avrasya =

Cargo ship hijacked in the 1996 Black Sea hostage crisis

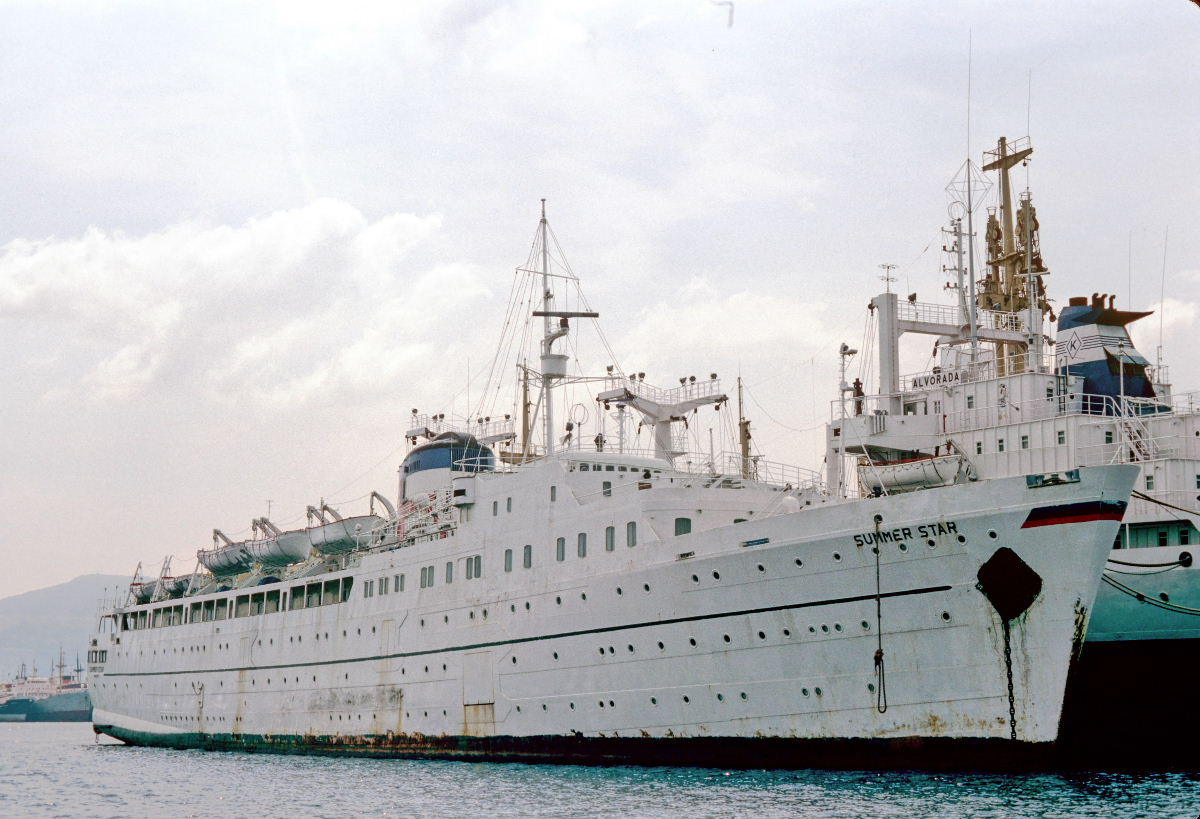
- Summer Star laid up in Eleusis in July 1986

History
- Name: Lazio (1953–79); Sant Andrea (1979–84); Makedonia (1984–85); Summer Star (1985–86); Corfu Diamond (1986–88); Larnaca Rose (1988–92); Avrasya (1992–96); Cortina (1996–97); Avrasya I (1997)
- Owner: Tirrenia Di Navigazione SpA (1953–79); unknown (1979–84); Achaid Lines (1984–86); Agapitos Bros (1986–88); Megacycle Shipping Co (1988–94); Mirror Holdings (1993–97)
- Operator: Tirrenia Di Navigazione SpA (1953–79); unknown (1979–80); Transazul Car Ferries (1980–82); Achaid Lines (1984–85); Panko Inc (1985); Agapitos Bros (1986–88); Megacycle Shipping Co (1988–93); Mirror Holdings (1993–97)
- Port of registry: (Italy) Naples (1953–79); Greece (1979–86); (Greece) Piraeus (1986–88); (Cyprus) Larnaca (1988–92); Panama City (1992–97)
- Route: Port Vendres – Puerto de Alcudia (1980–82); Patras – Igoumenitsa – Corfu – Brindisi (1984–85); Limassol – Beirut (1985); Brindisi – Patras (1987); Ancona – Kusadasi (1992–93)
- Builder: Cantieri Navali Riuniti
- Yard number: 201
- Launched: 8 March 1953
- Out of service: 1982–84; 1985–86; 1991–92
- Identification: IMO number: 5204558
- Fate: Scrapped 1997

General characteristics
- Type: Passenger ship (1953–67); Ro-Ro ferry (1967–97)
- Tonnage: 3,838 GT; 1,197 DWT
- Length: 116.64 m (382 ft 8 in)
- Beam: 15.96 m (52 ft 4 in)
- Draught: 5.48 m (18 ft 0 in)
- Installed power: 4 diesel engines
- Propulsion: Screw propeller
- Speed: 16.7 knots (30.9 km/h)
- Capacity: 677 passengers (1953-67); 1,000 passengers, 110 cars (1967–97)
- Notes: Sisterships: Calabria, Sicilia

Avrasya was a Ro-Ro ferry that was hijacked in the Black Sea hostage crisis of 1996. Originally built in 1953 as the passenger ship Lazio, she was converted to a Ro-Ro ferry in 1967. In 1979, she was sold to Greece and renamed Sant Andrea. A sale in 1984 saw her renamed Makedonia, followed by a chartering in 1985 which saw her renamed Summer Star. A sale in 1986 saw her renamed Corfu Diamond and after a further sale in 1988 she was renamed Larnaca Rose. In 1992, she was sold to Panama and was renamed Avrasya. Following the hijacking incident, she was renamed Cortina, then Avrasya I in 1997. She was sold for scrapping in November 1997.

== Description ==
The ship was 116.64 metres (382 ft 8 in) long, with a beam of 15.96 metres (52 ft 4 in) and a draught of 5.48 metres (18 ft 0 in). She was 3,838 GT, 1,197 DWT. The ship was powered by four 6-cylinder Fiat diesel engines ( 6,120 kilowatts (8,210 hp)), which could propel her at 16.7 knots (30.9 km/h). As a passenger ship, she could carry 678 passengers in 377 berths. Following rebuilding as a Ro-Ro ferry, she could carry 1,000 passengers in 478 berths, and 110 cars.

== History ==
=== Early history ===
Lazio was built as a passenger ship by Cantieri Navali Riuniti, Palermo as yard number 201. She was launched in 1953. Built for Tirrenia di Navigazione SpA, Naples, she was one of the first three post-war ships built for the company. Her sister ships were Calabria and Sicilia. In 1967, Lazio was converted to a Ro-Ro ferry in 1967. With the introduction of IMO Numbers, Lazio was allocated the number 5204588.

In 1979, Lazio was sold to a Greek buyer and was renamed Sant Andrea. She was chartered in 1980 by Transazul Car Ferries, Port Vendres, France and used on the Port Vendres – Puerto de Alcudia, Mallorca, Spain route. In 1982, she was laid up in Perama, Greece. In June 1984, Sant Andrea was sold to Achaid Lines, Piraeus and renamed Makedonia. She was chartered to Panko Inc. in 1985 and renamed Summer Star. In April 1985, she entered service on the Patras – Igoumenitsa – Corfu – Brindisi route.

In July 1985, Summer Star was arrested in Patras. Between August and October of that year, she was used on the Limassol – Beirut route. On 24 December 1985, Summer Star was laid up in Piraeus. In December 1986, following a takeover of her owners by Agapito Bros, Piraeus, she was renamed Corfu Diamond. During 1987, she served on the Brindisi – Patras route. In 1988, Corfu Diamond was sold to the Megacycle Shipping Co, Limassol, Cyprus and was renamed Larnaca Rose. In 1991, she was laid up in Piraeus. Larnaca Rose was reflagged to Panama in 1992 and renamed Avrasya. She entered service on the Ancona – Kuşadası route. In 1993, Avrasya was sold to Mirror Holdings SA, Panama. She operated routes on the Black Sea.

=== Hijacking during Chechen War ===
On 16 January 1996, Avrasya was hijacked at Trabzon, Turkey by six Turkish citizens descended from the Caucasus and two Chechen and one Abkhaz, led by Abkhaz Muhammed Tokcan. There were 45 crew and 120 passengers on board at the time. The hijackers threatened to kill a hostage every 10 minutes unless the captain of the ship revealed himself and agreed to sail out of port. The Turkish authorities did not prevent the ship from leaving port. The rebels threatened to sink the ship in the Bosporus Strait if fighting continued in Pervomayskoye. Two frigates and a destroyer of the Turkish Navy shadowed Avrasya. Negotiations with the hijackers failed to obtain the release of a diabetic police officer and a pregnant woman. The hijacking ended without bloodshed on 19 January and Avrasya put into Karadeniz Ereğli. Thirteen of the hostages were taken to hospital. On 21 January, she departed Karadeniz Ereğli for her original destination of Sochi, Russia. The hijackers who were Turkish citizens, Erdinç Tekir, Sedat Temiz, Ertan Coşkun, Muhammet Tokcan and Ceyhun Mollamehmetoğlu, were sentenced to eight years in prison for hijacking. Erdinç Tekir, Sedat Temiz, Ertan Coşkun, Ceyhun Mollamehmetoğlu served 4½ years in prison. Muhammet Tokcan was released from prison on 23 December 2000.

=== Fate of the ship ===
Following the hijacking, Avrasya was renamed Cortina. In 1997, she was renamed Avrasya I. She was sold for scrap later that year, arriving on 25 November at Aliağa, Turkey for scrapping.
