= Abkhazian Orthodox Church =

Eastern Orthodox church

Abkhazian Orthodox Church Абхазская Православная церковь Аԥсны Аиашахаҵаратә ауахәама
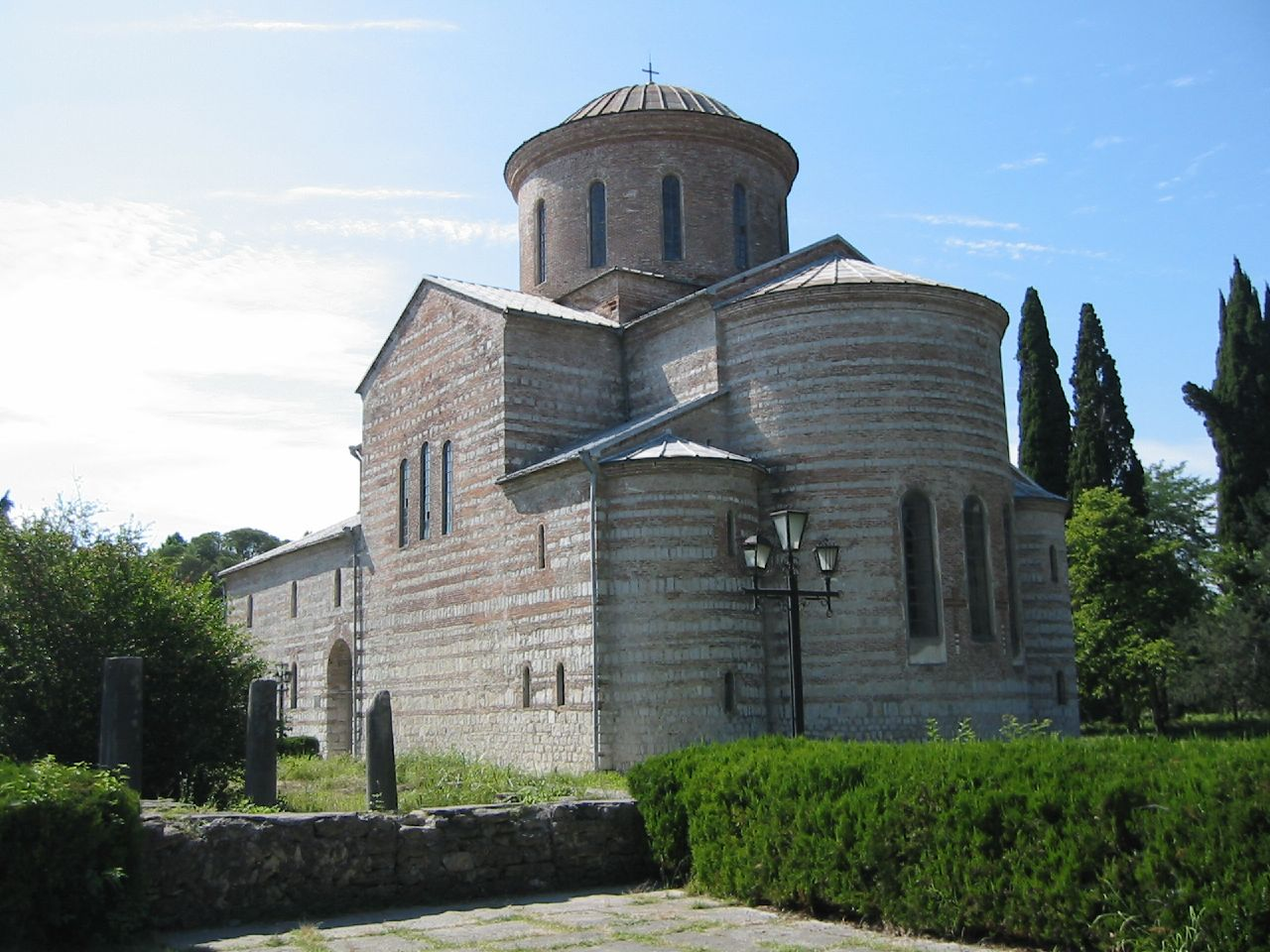
- Pitsunda Cathedral, or St. Andrew the Apostle Cathedral, main seat of the Abkhazian Orthodox Church
- Abbreviation: AOC
- Type: Eastern Orthodox
- Classification: Independent Eastern Orthodox
- Primate: Vissarion Aplaa
- Bishops: 2
- Parishes: 144
- Monasteries: 2
- Language: Abkhaz, Russian
- Headquarters: Sukhumi
- Territory: Abkhazia
- Independence: 15 September 2009
- Recognition: None
- Separated from: Georgian Orthodox Church
- Official website: aiasha.ru

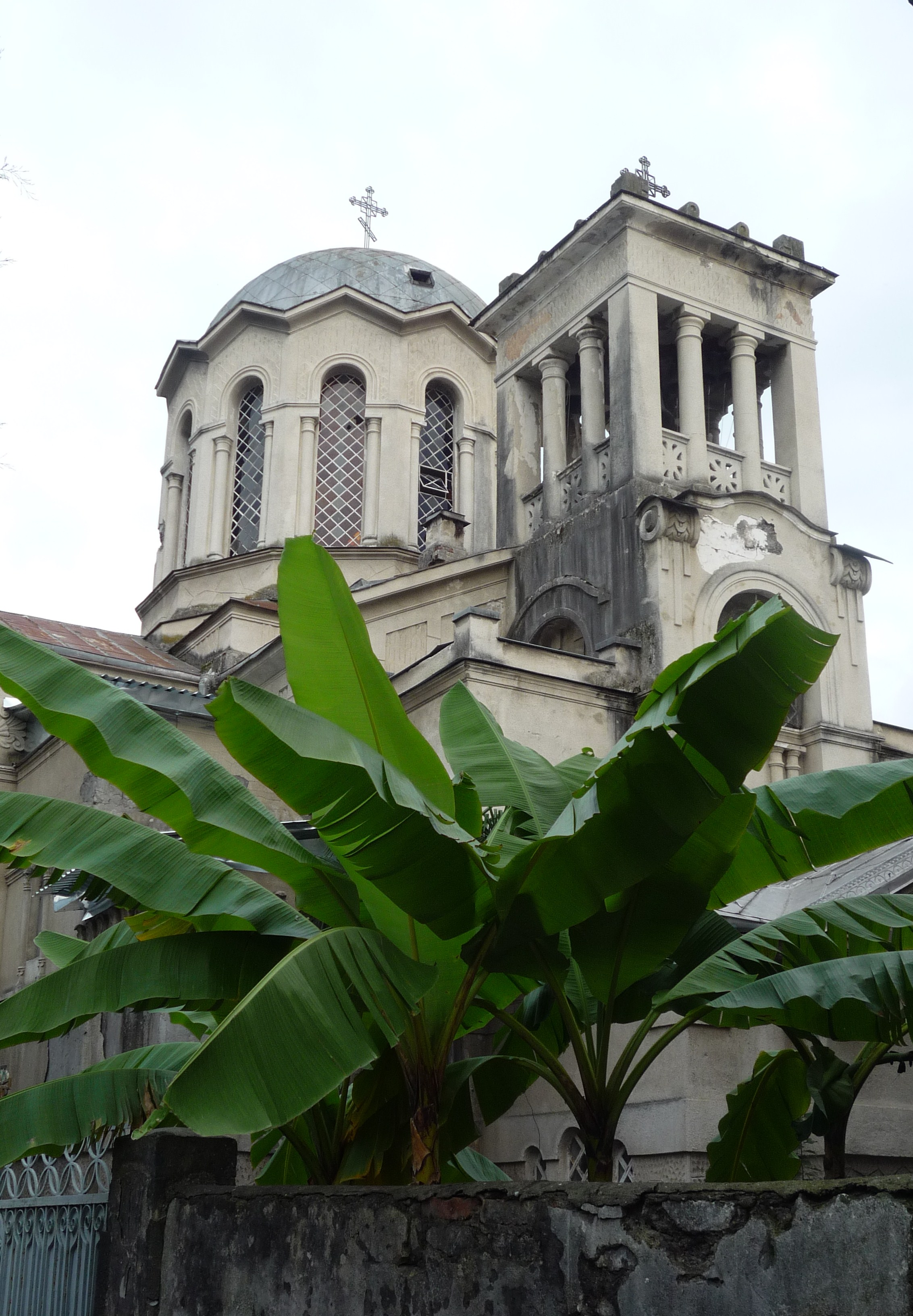
Abkhazian Orthodox Church in Sukhumi, capital of Abkhazia

The Abkhazian Orthodox Church (Abkhaz: Аԥсны Аиашахаҵаратә ауахәама, romanized: Apsnə Ajašaxac̣araṭ° awax°ama, Russian: Абхазская Православная церковь, romanized: Abkhazskaya Pravoslavnaya tserkov') is an Eastern Orthodox church outside the official Eastern Orthodox ecclesiastical hierarchy. It came into existence when the Sukhumi-Abkhazian Eparchy declared on 15 September 2009 that it no longer considered itself part of the Georgian Orthodox Church (but is considered as part of Georgian Orthodox Church by every Orthodox patriarchate including Russian) and that it was "re-establishing the Catholicate of Abkhazia disbanded in 1795". Vissarion Aplaa is the Primate of the Abkhazian Orthodox Church since 2009 and is the self-proclaimed catholicos of the Church. It has two eparchies (dioceses) in Pitsunda and Sukhumi.

== History ==
=== Catholicate of Abkhazia (1470s–1814) ===
The Catholicate of Abkhazia (Georgian: აფხაზეთის საკათალიკოსო) was a subdivision of the Georgian Orthodox Church that existed as an independent entity in western Georgia from the 1470s to 1814 in areas generally known as Abkhazia presently. The Catholicate of Abkhazia was headed by the Catholicos (later, Catholicos Patriarch), officially styled as the Catholicos Patriarch of Imereti, Odishi, Ponto-Abkhaz-Guria, Racha-Lechkhum-Svaneti, Ossetians, Dvals, and all of the North. The residence of the Catholicoi was at Bichvinta (now Pitsunda) in Abkhazia (hence, the name of the Catholicate), but was moved to the Gelati Monastery in Imereti in the late 16th century. The Abkhazian Orthodox Church considers itself to be the continuation of the Catholicate of Abkhazia.

=== Russian church control (1814–1917) ===
After the conquest of Imereti by Imperial Russia in 1810, the Catholicate of Abkhazia was abolished by the Russian authorities in 1814, by the Russian authorities, and annexed to the Exarchate of Georgia, a subdivision of the Russian Orthodox Church. Consequently, the office of the Catholicos of Abkhazia was abolished by the Russian Empire that said it would take control of the Georgian church. The Catholicate of Abkhazia was disbanded in 1814, and all local dioceses were taken over by the Russian Orthodox Church.

=== Georgian church control (1917–1993) ===
In 1917, following the fall of the Russian Tsar Nicholas II with the Communist Revolution, the dioceses became part of the Georgian Orthodox Church. The Abkhazian orthodox dioceses fell under the canonically recognized territory of the Georgian Orthodox Church as the Sukhumi-Abkhazian eparchy. This move restored the unified and autocephalous Georgian Orthodox Church in 1917 under one Catholicos Patriarch, namely Kyrion II under the title Catholicos-Patriarch of All Georgia. He was assassinated in 1918. He was succeeded by Leonid of Georgia in 1918.

=== The War and the Intermediate period (1993–2009) ===
The Georgian church control was seriously compromised with the 1992–1993 war in Abkhazia. Ethnically Georgian priests had to flee Abkhazia and the Georgian Orthodox church effectively lost control of Abkhazian church affairs. The last Georgian monks and nuns, based in the upper Kodori Valley, were expelled early in 2009 after they resisted pressure from the Abkhaz authorities to sever allegiance to the Georgian church.

The ethnically Abkhaz Vissarion Aplaa was the only remaining priest after the early 1990s war and he became acting head of the Sukhumi-Abkhazian eparchy. In the following years, recently consecrated clerics from the neighbouring Russian Maykop Eparchy arrived in Abkhazia. The new priests (archimandrite Dorotheos Dbar, hieromonk Andrew Ampar, hierodeacon David Sarsania) came into conflict with Vissarion, but through the mediation of Russian church officials, the two sides managed to reach a power-sharing agreement in Maikop in 2005. Under the agreement, the Eparchy would thenceforth have co-chairs and be named the Abkhazian Eparchy with undefined canonical status, to stress its separation from the Georgian Orthodox Church. The agreement did not hold however, when Priest Vissarion refused to share the leadership and continued to sign documents using the old name of the Eparchy.

=== Complete separation and reestablishment of the Catholicate of Abkhazia (2009–present) ===
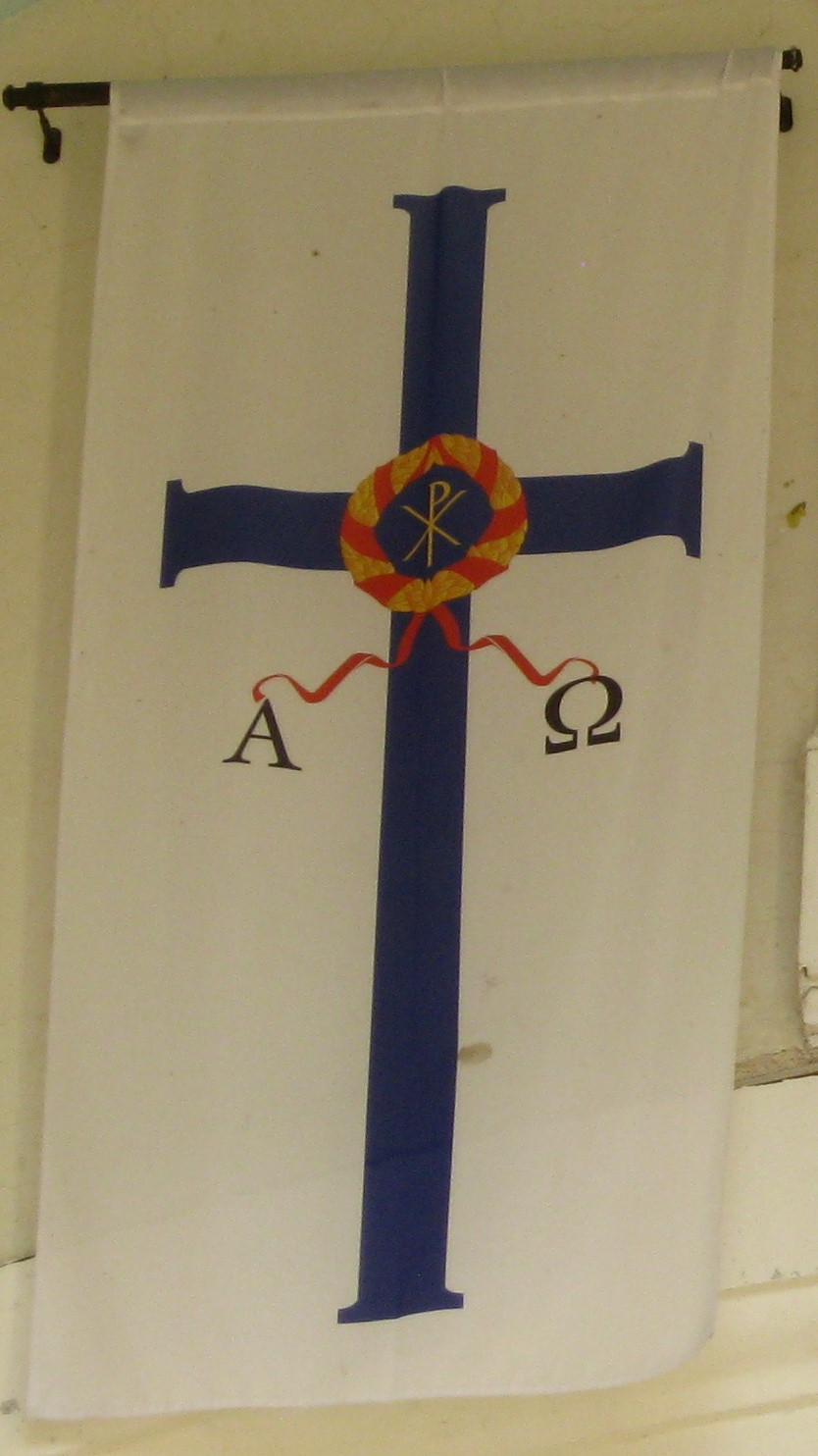
Abkhazian Orthodox Church standard

On 15 September 2009, the leadership of the Sukhumi-Abkhazian Eparchy, against the authority of Ilia II, Catholicos Patriarch of All Georgia, declared that it no longer considered itself part of the Georgian Orthodox Church, and that it was re-establishing the Catholicate of Abkhazia, and that it would henceforth be known as the Abkhazian Orthodox Church.

Its leader, Vissarion Aplaa, asked both the Russian and Georgian Orthodox churches to recognize the "Abkhazian Orthodox Church". A spokesman for the Georgian patriarchate said the decision to separate from the Georgian Orthodox Church was taken by a "group of impostors", while the Russian Orthodox Church confirmed that it continued to view Abkhazia as the canonical territory of the Georgian Church.

On 9 February 2011, the Abkhazian government transferred 38 churches, cathedrals and monasteries perpetually into the care of the Abkhazian Orthodox Church.

Hierarchy

Vissarion Aplaa is the Primate of the Abkhazian Orthodox Church since 2009 and is the self-proclaimed catholicos of the Abkhazian Orthodox Church. The Pitsunda Cathedral is the church's chief cathedral and the seat of its primate.

The Church is presently organised into two eparchies, one in Pitsunda and another in Sukhumi. The Church has nine parishes. It also has two monasteries, the New Athos Monastery and the Kaman Monastery.

== Gallery ==
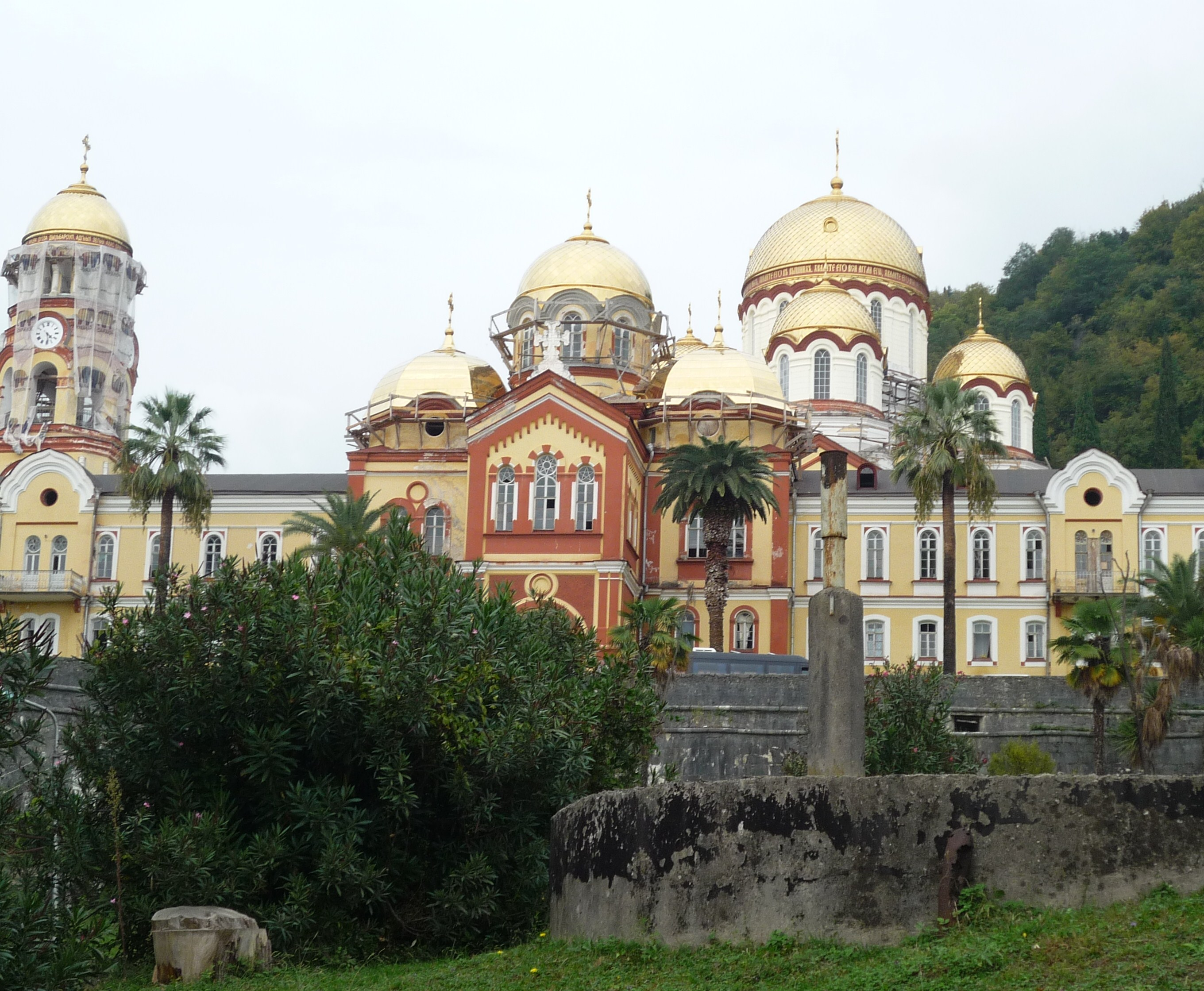
New Athos Monastery

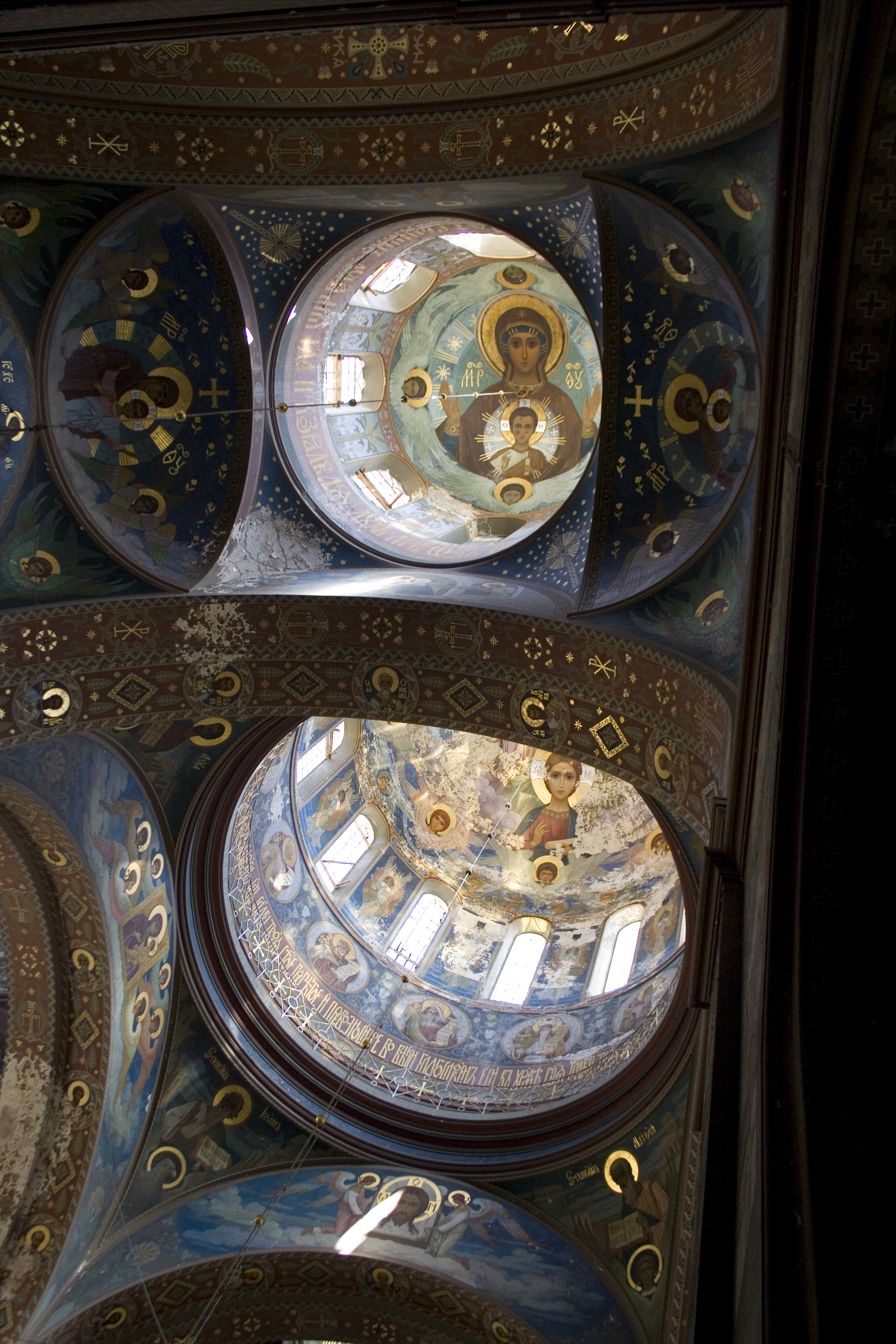
New Athos Monastery frescoes

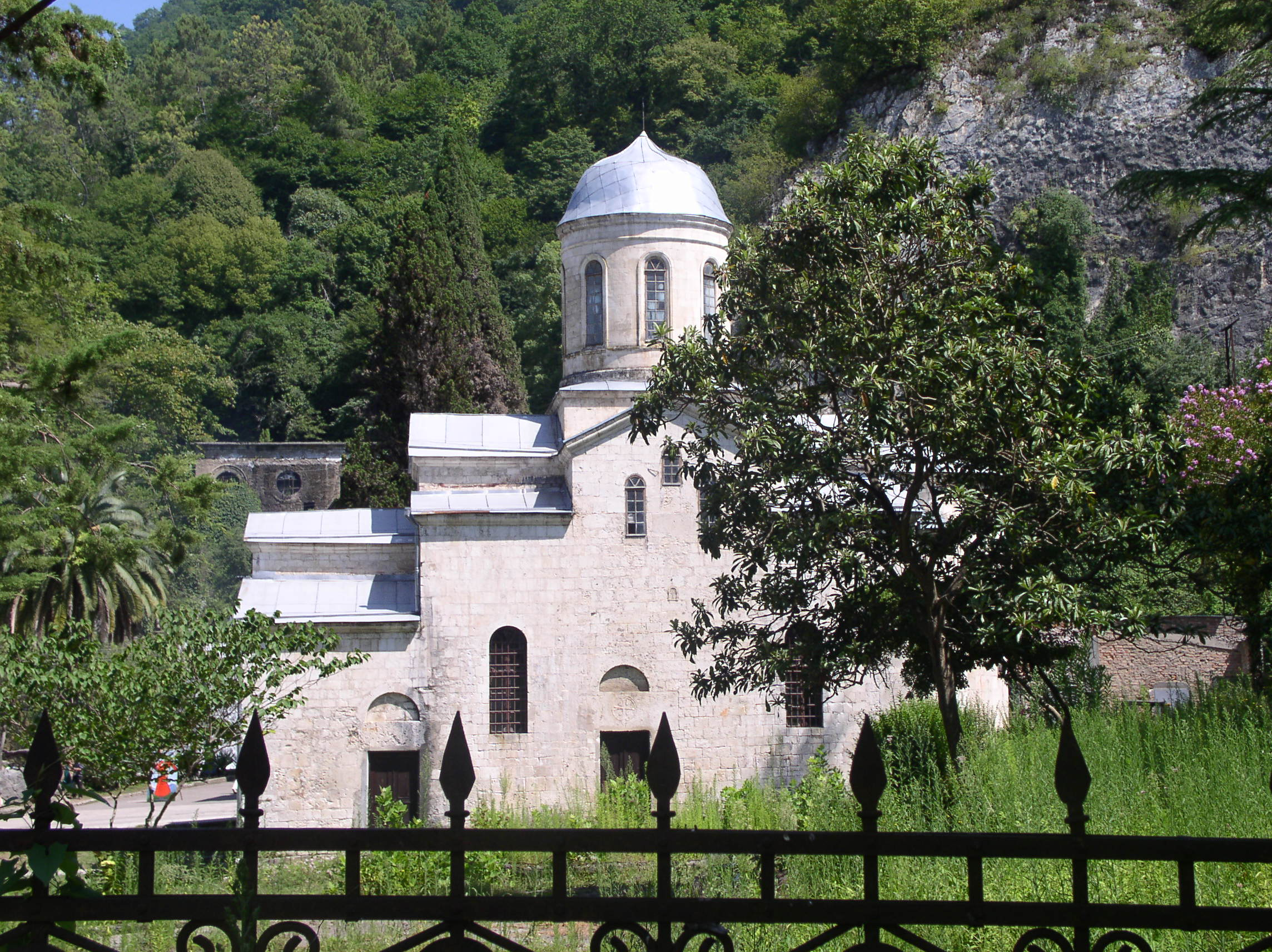
Church of St. Simon the Canaanite, New Athos

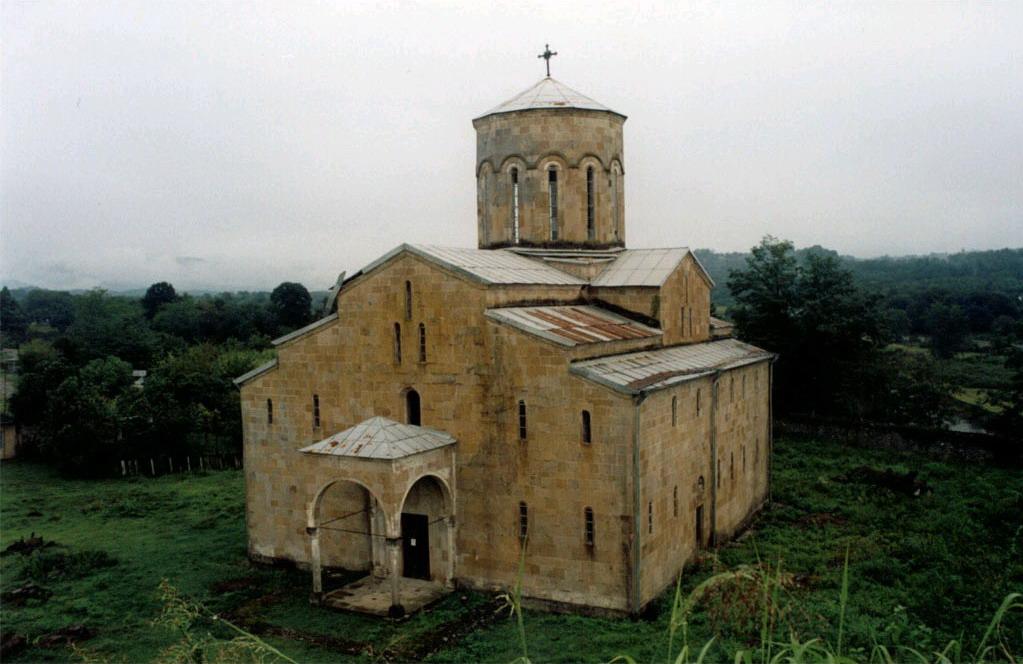
Mokvi Cathedral

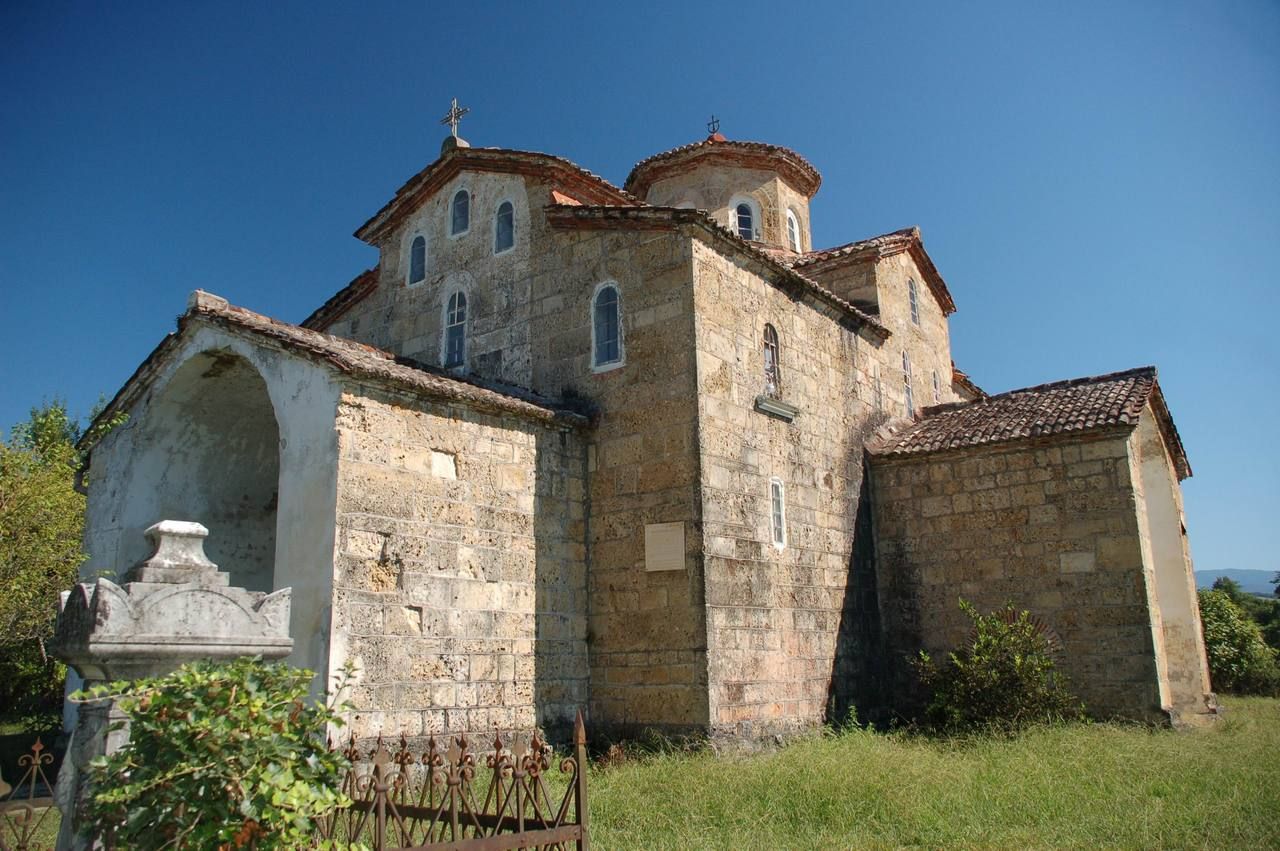
Lykhny temple

== See also ==
- Montenegrin Orthodox Church
- Macedonian Orthodox Church
- Orthodox Church in Italy
- Belarusian Autocephalous Orthodox Church
